= Del Junco =

Spanish surname

del Junco is a Spanish surname meaning “from the reeds”. The most notable family with this name is the Rodrigo del Junco family which originally came from Oviedo, Asturias, Spain. In the second half of the 16th century, the family settled in St. Augustine, Florida before establishing in Matanzas, Cuba during the 17th century. The family’s residence in Matanzas was widely known as the Palacio Del Junco (the Del Junco Palace). The house is no longer used as a private residence but it hosts a state-owned Museum. In Matanzas, the family also owned the Palmar del Junco stadium. There, in 1874, the first game of baseball was played in Cuba. The Matanzas’ Del Junco family still owns one of the largest crypt in the Necropolis de San Carlos Borromeo Most members of the family emigrated to Florida, Asturias, Panama, and Mexico following the establishment of a communist system in Cuba.

== Some notable descendants of Rodrigo del Junco are ==
- Carlos del Junco, renowned Cuban-Canadian harmonica musician
- Mauricio J. Tamargo, lawyer and 14th Chairman of the Foreign Claims Settlement Commission
- Pedro Junco, famous Cuban composer
- Tirso del Junco surgeon and U.S. Republican leader in California
- Tirso del Junco-Bobadilla, is a renowned Cuban-American surgeon.
- Max Borges del Junco, architect
- Max Borges Jr., Cuban-born architect
- Miguel Díaz de la Portilla, Cuban-American former Florida State Senator and Miami-Dade County Commissioner

== See also ==
- Francisco del Junco, Cuban-American serial killer
- Juan del Junco, Spanish conquistador

== General references ==
- Historia de Familias Cubanas (Ediciones Universal, Miami, Florida 1985) ISBN 0-89729-380-0 (in Spanish)

== Particular Reference to ==
Alonso del Portillo-del Junco

- Historia de Familias Cubanas (Ediciones Universal, Miami, Florida 1985 ISBN 0-89729-380-0) (in Spanish)
- Origenes - Compendio Historico Genealogico del Linea Zayas Descendencia del Infante Don Jaime de Aragon (Zayas Publishing, 2003, ISBN 0-9672876-0-X) (in Spanish)

Alonso del Portillo-Marcano

- Historia de Familias Cubanas (Ediciones Universal, Miami, Florida 1985 ISBN 0-89729-380-0)
- Directorio Social de la Habana 1948, (P. Fernandez y Cia S.A.) (in Spanish)
- Origenes - Compendio Historico Genealogico del Linea Zayas Descendencia del Infante Don Jaime de Aragon (Zayas Publishing, 2003, ISBN 0-9672876-0-X) (in Spanish)

Alonso J. del Portillo-Tamargo

- Historia de Familias Cubanas (Ediciones Universal, Miami, Florida 1985 ISBN 0-89729-380-0) (in Spanish)
- Origenes - Compendio Historico Genealogico del Linea Zayas Descendencia del Infante Don Jaime de Aragon (Zayas Publishing, 2003, ISBN 0-9672876-0-X) (in Spanish)
- Directorio Social de la Habana 1948, (P. Fernandez y Cia S.A.) (in Spanish)
- http://www.alpha66.org/ (in Spanish)
- https://web.archive.org/web/20070610233626/http://www.miami-dadeclerk.com/public-records/searchresult2.asp?page=1

Alonso R. del Portillo

- Pedro and Me: Friendship, Loss, and What I Learned by Judd Winick (2000; Henry Holt & Co.)
- Historia de Familias Cubanas (Ediciones Universal, Miami, Florida 1985 ISBN 0-89729-380-0) (in Spanish)
- Origenes - Compendio Historico Genealogico del Linea Zayas Descendencia del Infante Don Jaime de Aragon (Zayas Publishing, 2003, ISBN 0-9672876-0-X) (in Spanish)
- The International Jesuit Alumni Directory Belen (Bernard C. Harris Publishing Company Inc, 2004) MCNH-W54-4-4.OVA, page 74
- The International Jesuit Alumni Directory Belen (Forum Press Inc., 1994), page 254
- Belen Jesuit Prep Echoes Vol. XVI, 1978, Taylor Publishing Company, page 208
- Belen Jesuit Prep Echoes Vol. XV, 1977, page 174
- The Miami Herald - March 5, 1990 - LOCAL
- The Miami Herald - January 7, 2000 - DIVORCES
