= Miramar, Havana =

Coordinates: 23°7′21″N 82°25′10″W

Miramar District
- District of Havana
- Distrito del Miramar
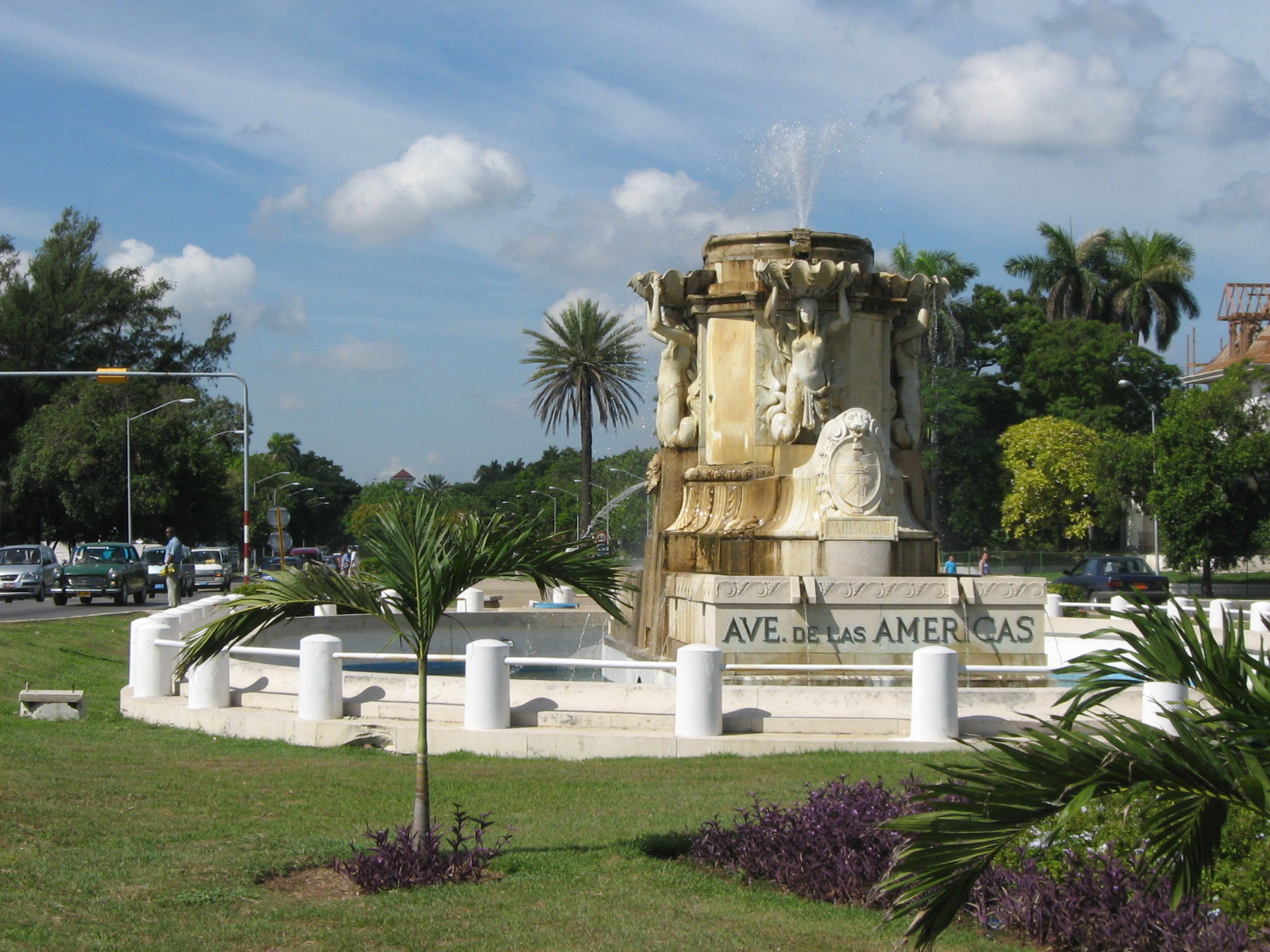
- Avenida de las Americas / Carretera a el Aeropuerto Internacional de la Habana
- Nickname: Miramar
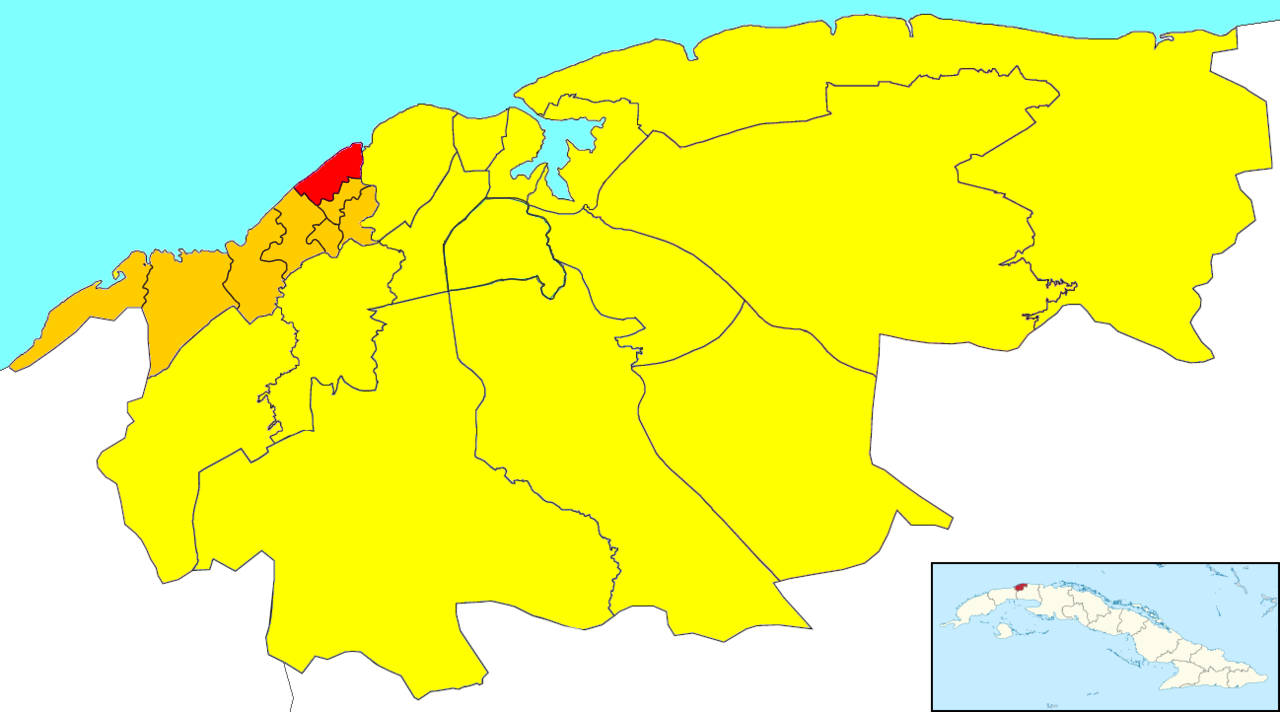
- Location of Miramar in Havana
- Country: Cuba
- Province: Havana
- Municipality: Playa
- Elevation: 45 m (148 ft)

Population
  - Total: 472,569
- Time zone: EST
- Area code: (+53) 7

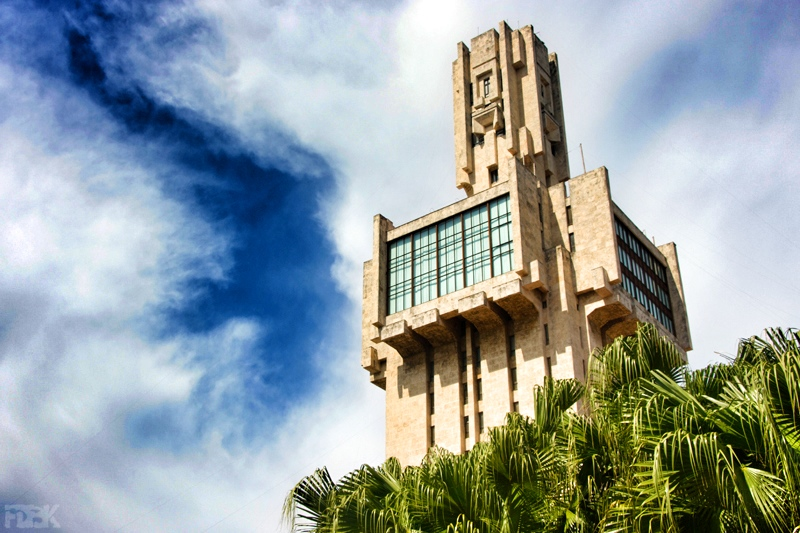
The Russian embassy in Miramar

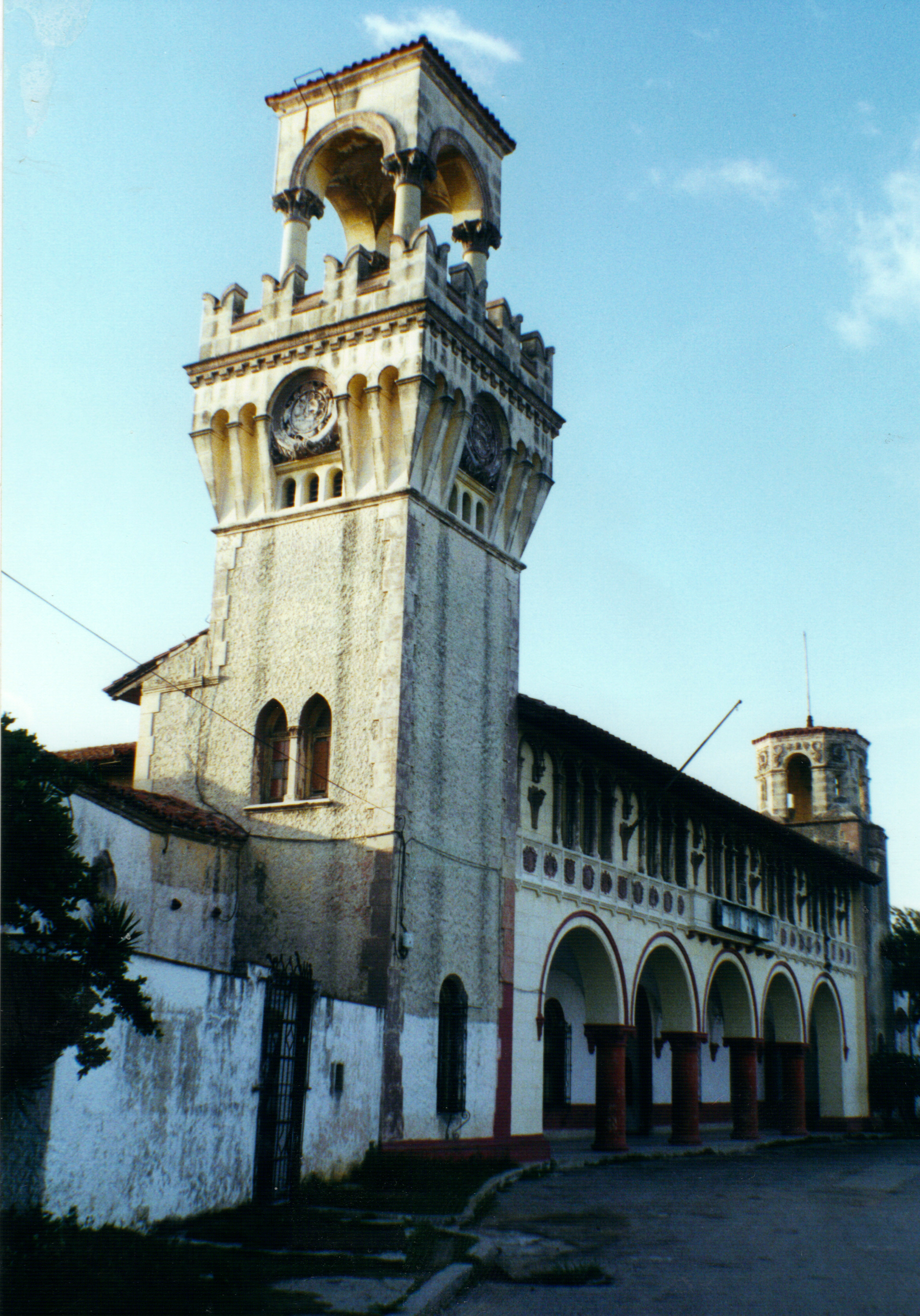
Playa La Concha

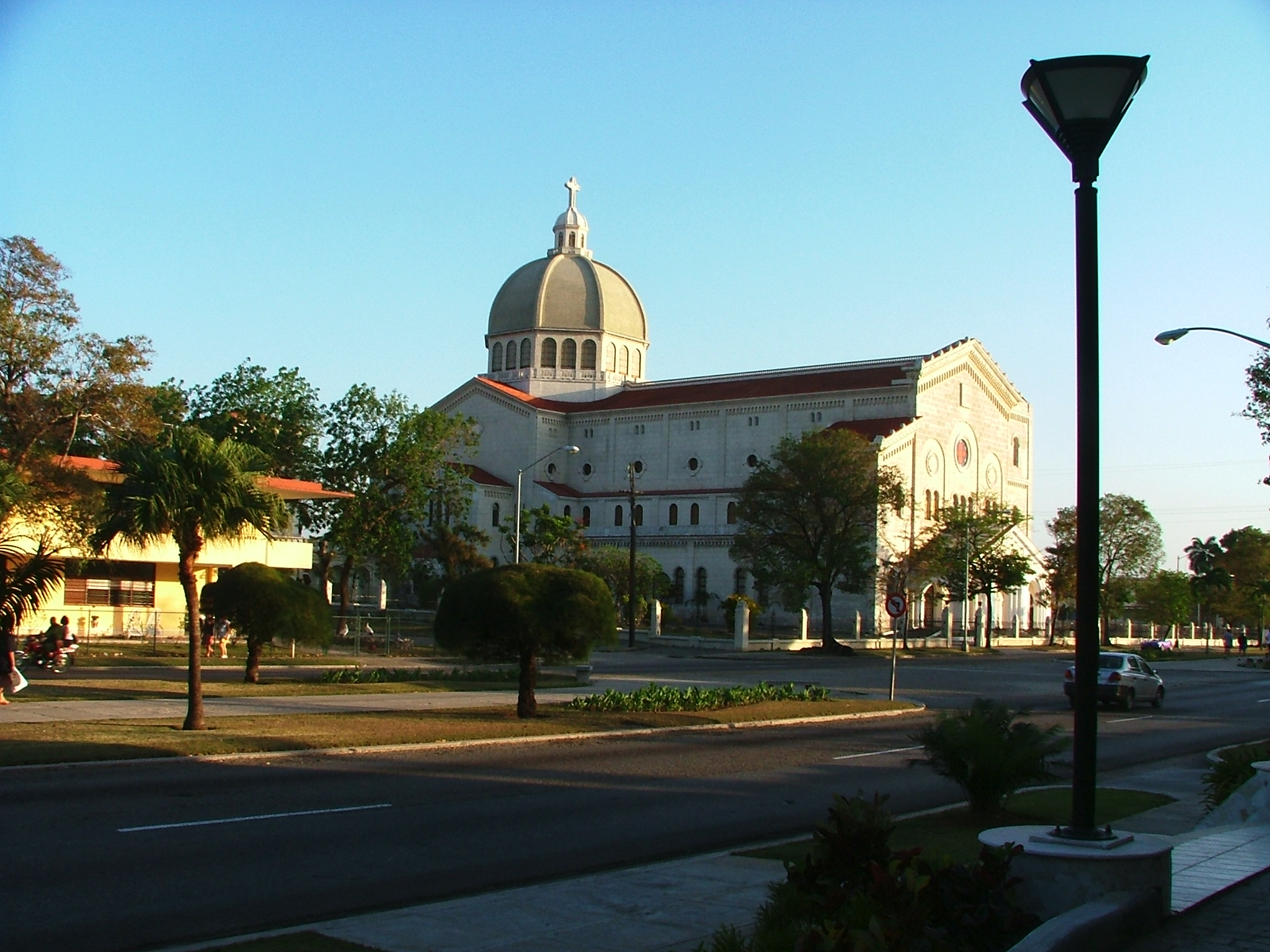
The church "Jesus de Miramar" on Quinta Avenida in Miramar

Miramar is a residential district (zona residencial) of the municipality of Playa, in the city of Havana, Cuba.

== Overview ==
Many embassies, including the landmark Russian Embassy, are located in Miramar - in particular on Quinta Avenida (Fifth Avenue) previously called Avenida de las Américas (Avenue of the Americas).

Prior to the Revolution, the neighborhood was home to many of Havana's upscale residents. There are many large houses and mansions here. This district and the Country Club (Cubanacán) were the most glamorous spaces in the Havana of the 50s. There are also some of Havana's more modern hotels, such as Hotel Melia Habana, Oasis Panorama Hotel and Occidental Miramar, beaches and private rental houses (known as casas particulares). Also located here is the International School of Havana.

Since the late 1990s, several office blocks have been built in a complex called Centro de Negocios Miramar - the "Miramar Trade Center".

== Points of interest ==
=== Quinta Avenida (Fifth Avenue) ===
- Casa de Alberto de Armas (1926), a restored Beaux-Arts mansion at Calle 2 by architect Jorge Luis Echarte
- Reloj de Quinta Avenida at Calle 10, a large clock erected in 1924 in the central median
- Museum of the Ministry of the Interior (Museo del Ministerio del Interior) at Calle 12
- Casa del Habano (between Calles 14 and 16) (also in the Melia Habana near the Miramar Trade Center and Club Habana)
- Teatro Miramar at Calle 94
- Parque de los Ahorcados (Park of the Hanged), between Calles 24 and 26, "shaded by massive jagüey trees, seemingly supported by their aerial roots dangling like cascades of water"
- Karl Marx Theater (Teatro Karl Marx) in the park
- Plaza Emiliano Zapata, with a life-size stone statue of Zapata, Mexico’s revolutionary hero
- Rosita De Hornedo Hotel, now the CIMEX corporation, located on First Avenue between 0 and 2.
- Iglesia de Santa Rita de Casia (at Calle 26) — a modernist church from 1942 which mixes neocolonial and modern features by architect Victor Morales. Features a modernist statue of Santa Rita by Rita Longa
- Gracious mansions, many of them foreign embassies
- Iglesia San Antonio de Padua (at Calle 60) — Modernist-style Romanesque church (1949) by architects Eloy Norman and Salvador Figueras
- Russian Embassy (1988) (between Calles 62 and 66) by architects Alexander Rochegov and Basilio Piasecki
- Occidental Miramar hotel, site of the former Peruvian Embassy
- Hotel Barceló Habana Ciudad (between Calles 76 and 80)
- Miramar Trade Center
- Iglesia de Jesús de Miramar (between Calles 80 and 82), built in 1953 with a magnificent organ with 5,000 pipes. The restored church features 14 splendid oversize paintings of the Stations of the Cross by Spanish artist César Hombrados Oñativa.
- El Ajibe, a restaurant visited by Anthony Bourdain on his Travel Channel program "No Reservations".
- Old Miramar Yacht Club, now a club for Cuban air force officers.
- Source: "Walking Quinta Avenida", Moon Travel Guides

=== Parks ===
- Parque Ecológico Monte Barreto, 9th Avenue west of Calle 70
- Parque de los Ahorcados (Park of the Hanged), Quinta Avenida between Calles 24 and 26

== Education ==
The International School of Havana, an English-language international school, is in Miramar.

The Centro Educativo Español de La Habana (CEEH), a Spanish-language international school, is in Miramar.

== Notable people ==
- Cristina Saralegui was born in Miramar, Havana.
- Lucky Luciano, American gangster, lived on an estate in Miramar.
- Martin Fox, Cuban gangster who hired the architect Max Borges Jr. to build him a house in the area. This was one of the first Cuban buildings to combine International Style Modernism with Colonial architecture.
