= Echarte =

Echarte is a surname. Notable people with the surname include:

- Jorge Luis Echarte (1891–1979), Cuban architect, engineer, diplomat, and politician
- Ricardo Echarte (born 1974), Spanish judoka
