= Iglesia de Jesús de Miramar =

Coordinates: 23°06′20.55″N 82°26′27.82″W

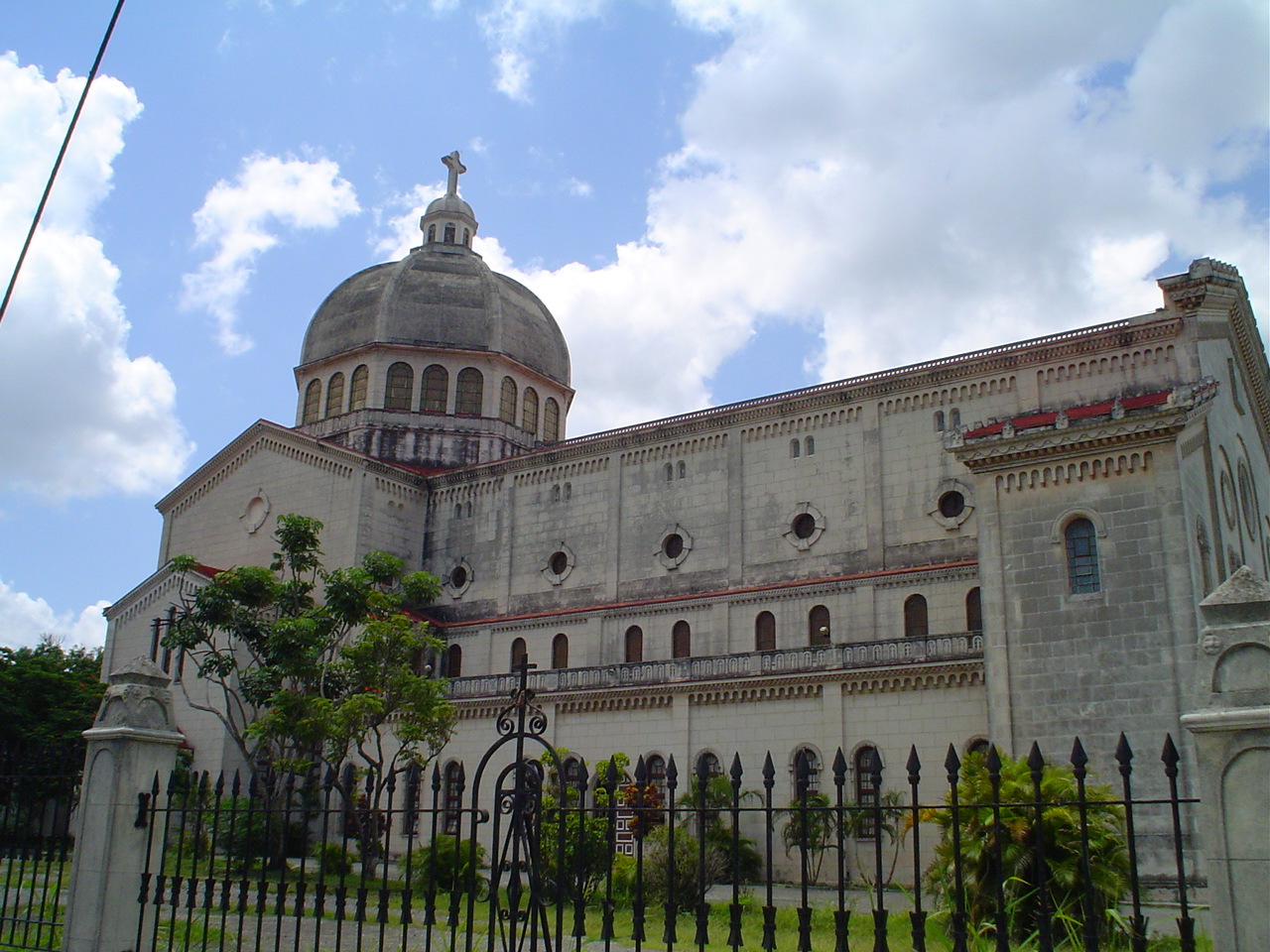
Side View (taken August 2007)

Iglesia de Jesús de Miramar is the second largest church in Cuba. It is located in the Roman Catholic Archdiocese of San Cristobal de la Habana.

It was begun in 1948 and inaugurated on May 28, 1953. It is constructed in the Romanesque-Byzantine style. Its architects were Eugenio Cosculluela (1893–1978) y, Guido Sutter. The church is located at Quinta Ave esquina de 82 (5th avenue at the corner of 82nd street), Miramar, La Habana, Cuba.

== Interior ==
The murals in the church were painted by the Spanish painter, Cesareo Marciano Hombrados y de Onativia (1909–1977) between the years 1952 and 1959. There are more than 266 figures represented in the 14 large murals. His model for the Virgin Mary was his wife, Sara Margarita Fernandez y Lopez (born August 5, 1927, in Havana, Cuba). The historian Carlos Eire, writes in his book Waiting for Snow in Havana, "What a church that was, so full of murals depicting the passion of Jesus of Nazareth. Huge, colorful murals, most of them densely packed with crowds and people. The oddest thing was that many of those who had paid for the murals had been included in these crowd scenes." (page 225)

The largest pipe organ in Cuba (with 5000 pipes) was inaugurated on November 22, 1956, in the church. Parts of the organ were brought from Spain, and the rest was constructed in the Church by the Spaniard Guillermo de Aizpuru Egiguren.

A Kilgen Theatre Organ, originally built for the Cine Encanto in Havana was also absorbed, with its console being expanded and incorporated, evident by its horseshoe shape.

== Grounds ==
In the gardens of the Church grounds is a copy of the Grotto of the Virgin of Our Lady of Lourdes, France, designed by the architect Max Borges Jr. and inaugurated on May 13, 1958.

== Gallery ==
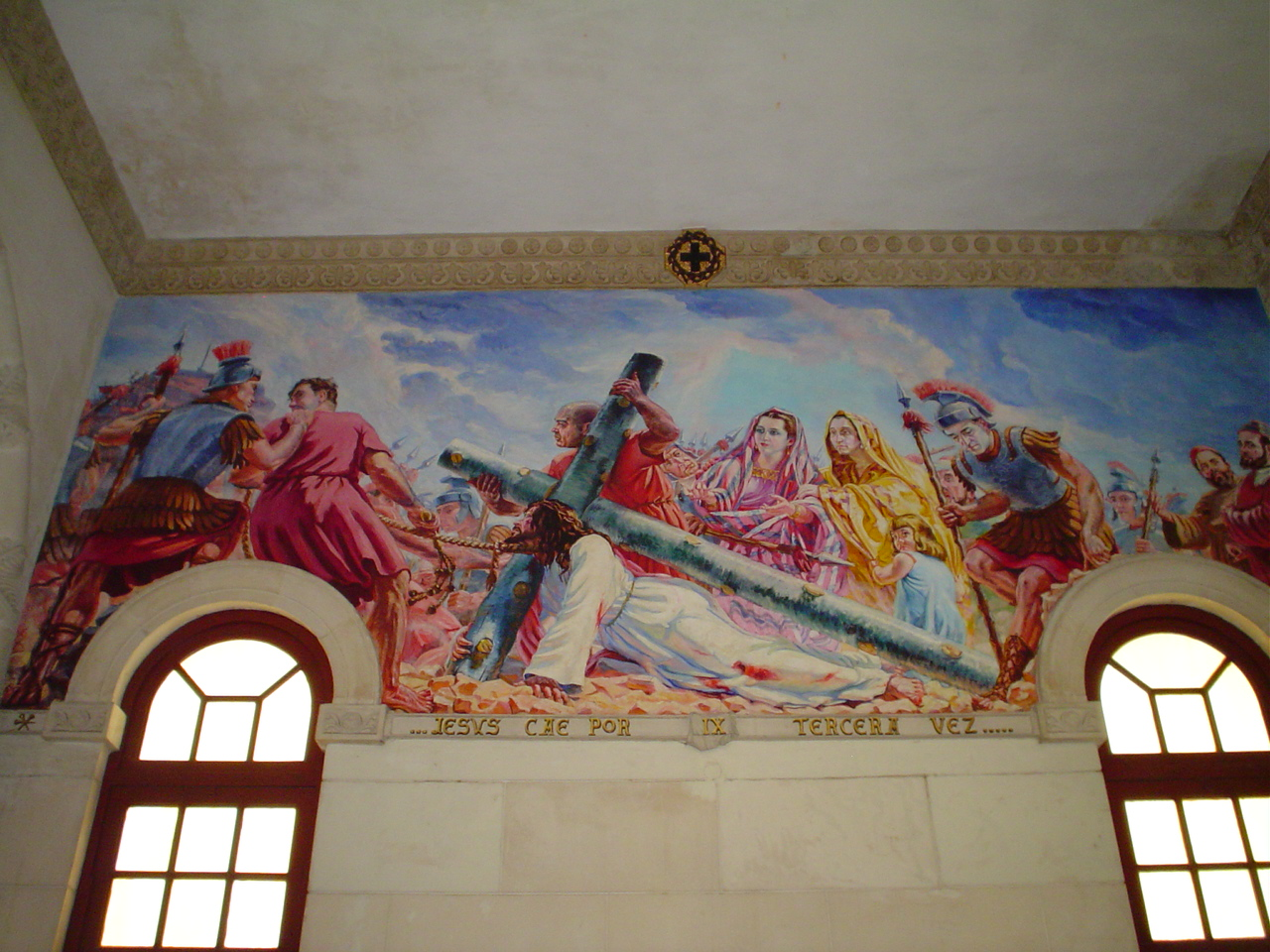
Mural in church.

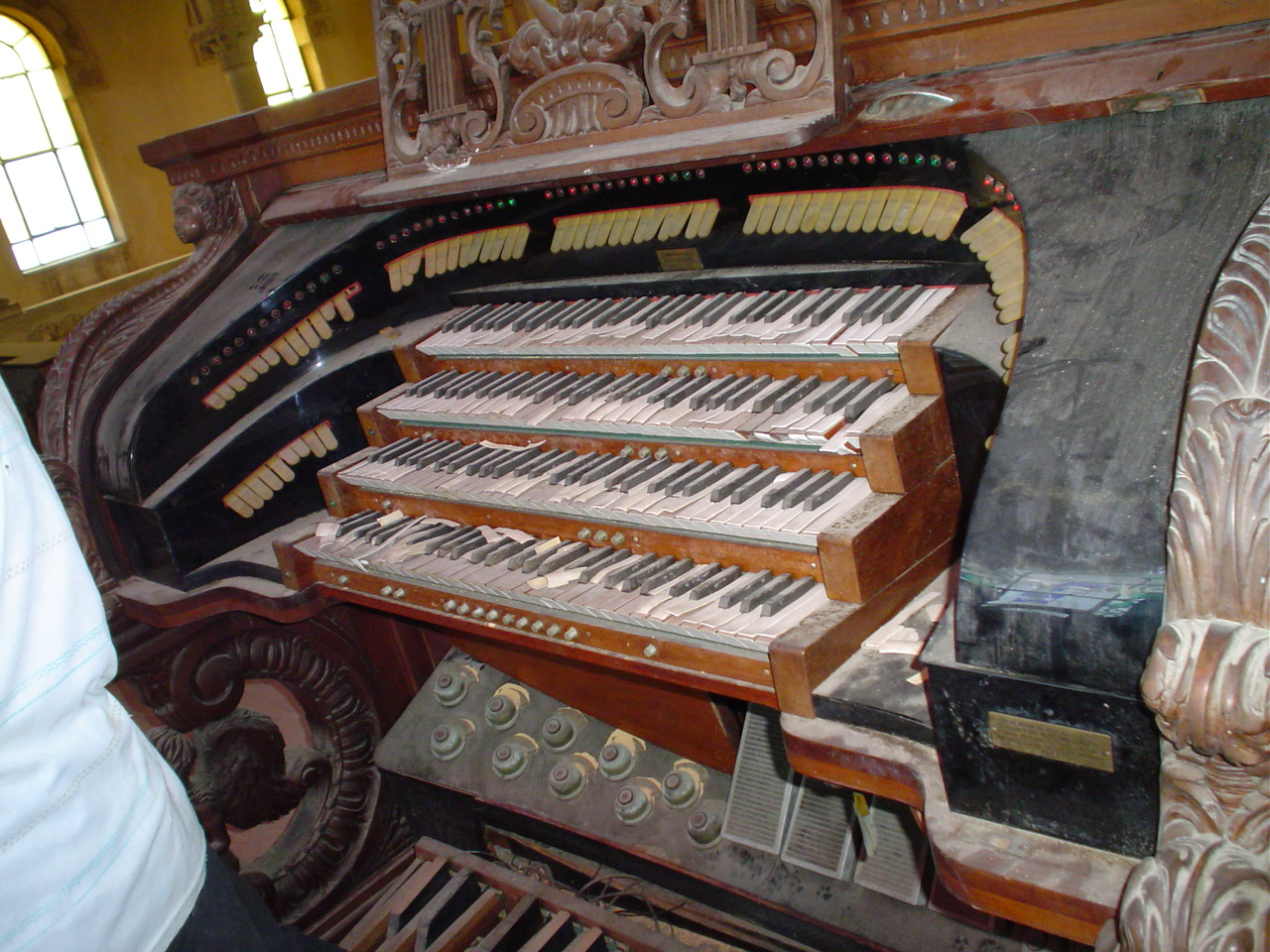
Organ in poor condition (taken August 2007)

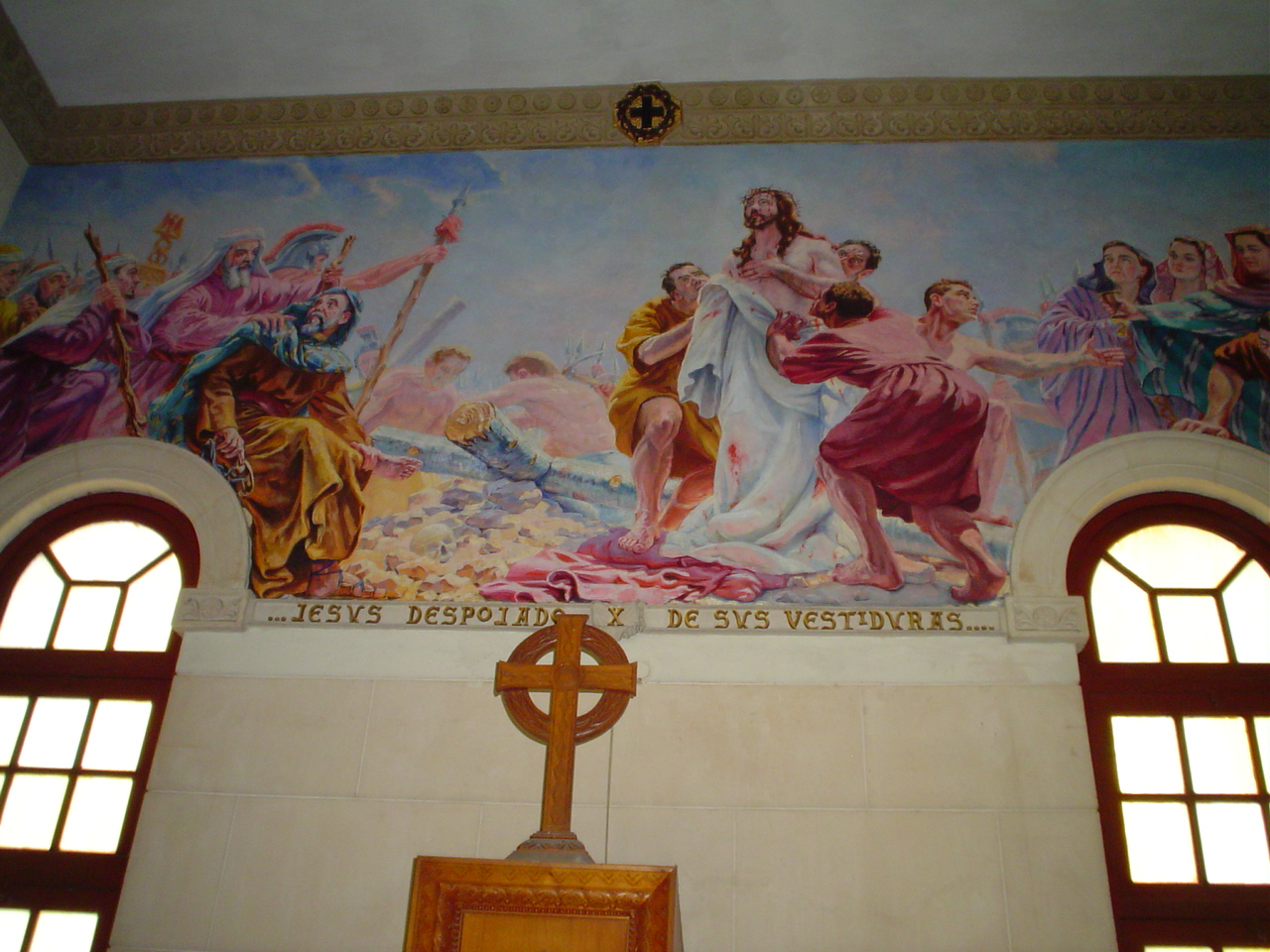
Mural in church.

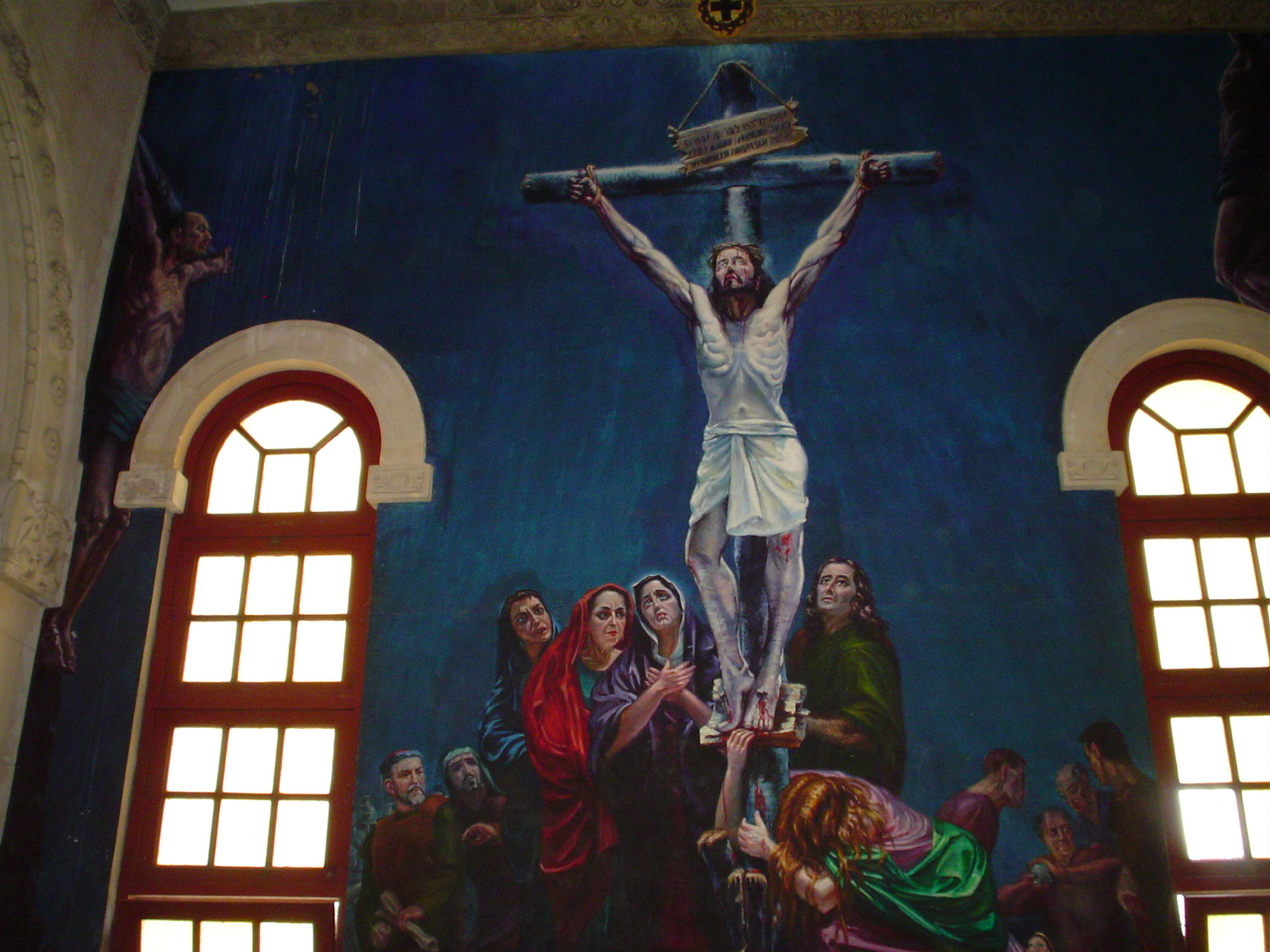
Mural in church.

Interior of the church looking north

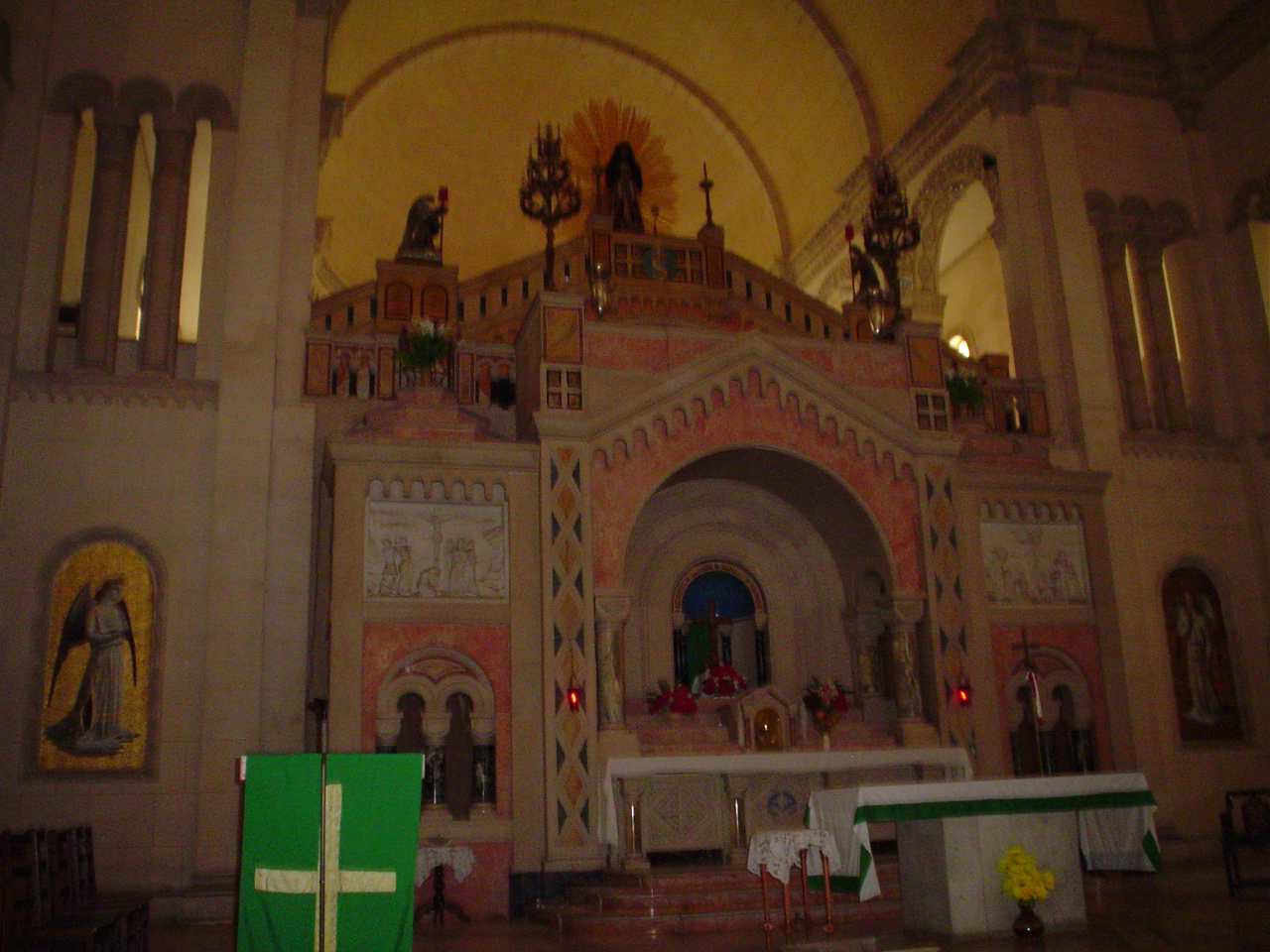
Main Altar.

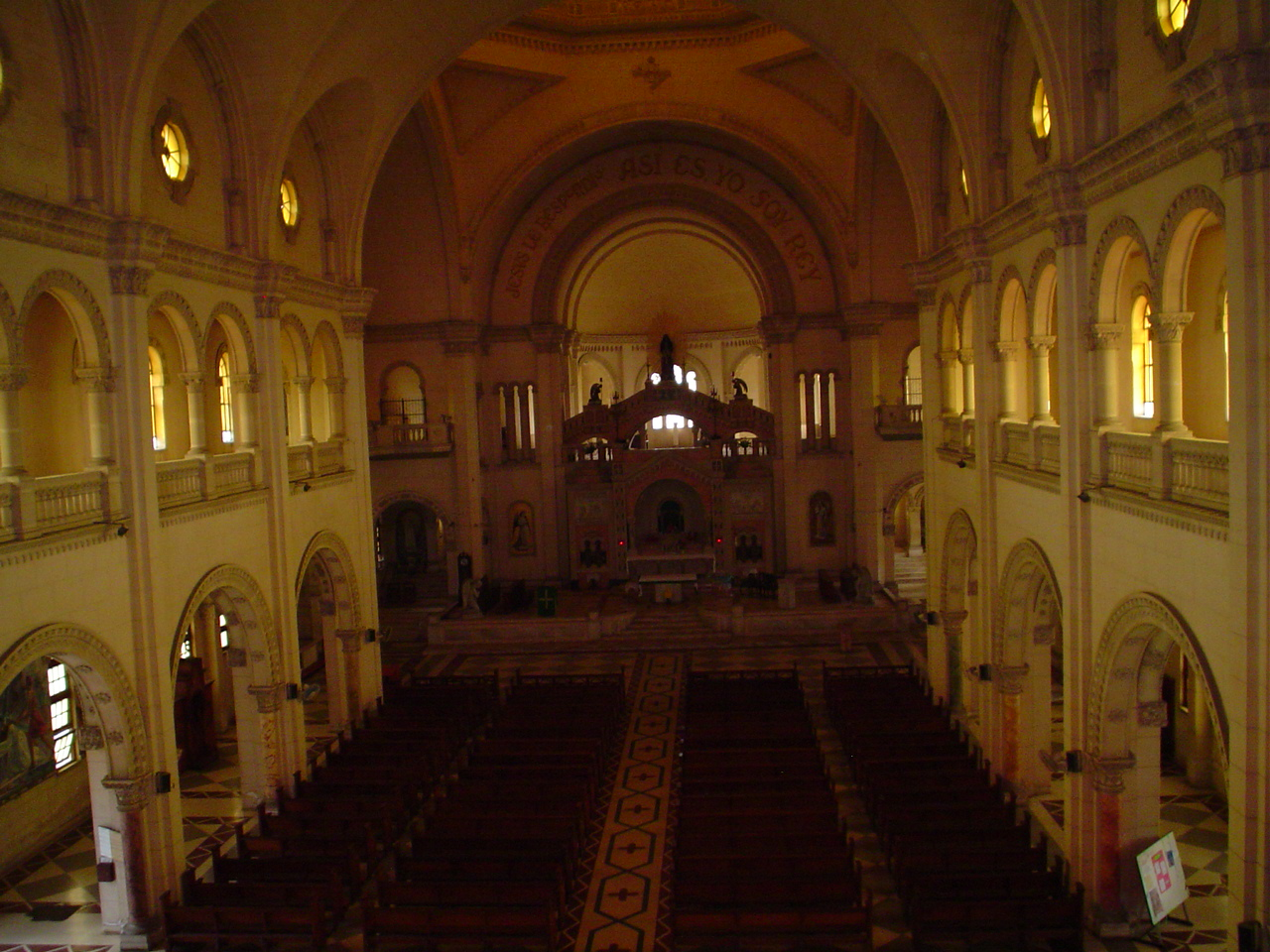
Interior of Church looking south towards the altar
