= Ofelia Fox =

American poet

Ofelia Fox (1923 – January 2, 2006), born Ofelia Suárez in Havana, Cuba, was a poet, lecturer and radio personality whose life as the wife of a Havana nightclub owner was chronicled in the book Tropicana Nights: the Life and Times of the Legendary Cuban Nightclub. .

Ofelia Suárez grew up in Cuba with three siblings. She published several books of poetry, and at the age of 29, she married businessman Martin Fox. Her husband became owner of the legendary Tropicana Club in Havana. It was there that Ofelia Fox first met many Hollywood stars and celebrities, such as Ava Gardner, Nat King Cole, Ernest Hemingway, Carmen Miranda and Tyrone Power.

In Cuba of the 1950s, Ofelia Fox became a well-known nightlife personality, as she was often by her husband's side at the nightclub. Under Martin Fox's ownership, the Tropicana Club flourished and became one of the most well-known entertainment venues in the world. Revolutionary forces, under the command of Fidel Castro, took over the club in 1959, prompting Martin and Ofelia to move to Miami. The couple, who had no children, lived for five years in Miami, where Ofelia became friends with Rosa Sánchez.

When Martin died of a stroke in 1964, Ofelia and Rosa moved to Glendale, California, near Los Angeles. Their house became a meeting place for Cubans living in California, and domino parties were common.

In 2003, author Rosa Lowinger approached Ofelia about working together to write a book about the Tropicana Nightclub. Tropicana Nights: The Life and Times of the Legendary Cuban Nightclub (Harcourt, 2005) was written by Lowinger with the assistance of Fox. The book incorporates hours of interviews with Fox and many former Tropicana employees. By the time of publication, Fox was battling both cancer and diabetes. She died at the age of 82 from cancer and complications from diabetes, at the St. Joseph Medical Center in Burbank, California.

In 2007 Rosa Sánchez published Ofelia Fox's Cuba, Patria en Lagrimas y el Mensaje de Liansu, a collection of her 1961-64 broadcasts on Miami's WMIE. Fox was the first female Cuban radio personality in Miami, and she was a public lecturer as well. The book includes excerpts and notes from her speeches. In November 2009 the book NOSOTRAS, OPENING THE DOOR TO OUR LOVE LIFE, authored by Ofelia Fox and Rosa Sanchez was published and presented at the Miami Book Fair International. For detailed information check Miami Herald article: WHEN OFELIA MET ROSA.
