= Náutico =

Náutico (nautical in Portuguese) may refer to:

- Clube Náutico Capibaribe, Brazilian football club, based in Recife, Pernambuco
- Náutico Futebol Clube, Brazilian football club, based in Boa Vista, Roraima
- Clube Náutico Marcílio Dias, Brazilian football club, based in Itajaí, Santa Catarina
- Club Náutico, Chilean football club, now known as Universidad de Chile (football club)
- Club Náutico Hacoaj, Argentine sports club
- Club Nautico di Roma, Italian yacht club
- Club Náutico, Cuban member's club
- Náutico (Havana), neighborhood in Playa, Havana, Cuba
