= Alejandro Gortazar =

Alejandro Gonzalez Gortazar (born 18 January 1973) is a Cuban photographer, visual artist, journalist and entrepreneur working in London, United Kingdom since 2009. Gortazar's photographic work has focused on nature, and wildlife and the environment. His photographs are sometimes mistaken for paintings.

== Early life ==
Gortazar was born in Havana, Cuba, in Los Sitios, Centro Habana. His grandfather, Francisco Gortazar, was a lawyer and a painter. His parents divorced, and in his early adolescence he went to live with his father in Madruga, where he rode horses, studied, made brooms and trained in Karate.

At the age of 15, Gortazar returned to Havana to study in the military school Camilo Cienfuegos, training to become a pilot. Gortazar left the Military and studied his A levels and became the president of the Federation of Students of Middle School. He started a degree in Chemistry, but switched to journalism, which led him to take up photography.

== Career ==
Gortazar's first camera was a Canon Prima BF film camera. Although he bought a digital camera, he continued with film due to technological limitations in digital printing in Cuba.

Gortazar studied artistic techniques with painter Raúl Camilo de la Vega, and held his first exhibition Lighthouses, guardians of the waters in 1999. After studying speed techniques, he created a series of photographs, The Malecon of my Havana.

Gortazar upgraded to professional equipment, and for twenty years worked as a photographic director, editor and publisher at a magazine. He did catwalk, studio and location photography for the fashion industry, prepared and set up exhibitions, and acted as official photographer for events of various kinds. He continues to photograph nature, both landscapes and wildlife, and took safari photographs for international organisations. Gortazar also presented a number of courses and workshops about photography.

He was interviewed on television in Cuba, and later abroad. His photographs began to be exhibited and acquired internationally and, in 2010, the series from his exhibition Horizons was received by the Vice-Minister of Culture and is kept in the national centre for photography, the Fototeca Nacional de Cuba. In 2013, Professor Jean Stubbs interviewed Gortazar for her forthcoming book on artists of the Cuban Diaspora.

In 2009 Gortazar moved to London; in 2010 he opened Studio Gortazar.in the Latin American and Caribbean Seven Sisters Indoor Market. Gortazar joined The Ward's Corner Community Coalition in their efforts to stop the English Heritage building home to the Seven Sisters Market from being demolished.

In 2012, Gortazar set up a company, 13 The Group Ltd., opened 13 The Gallery in Newington Green, and became the first Cuban to own an art gallery in Europe. 13 The Gallery is a fairtrade, community and internationalist nonprofit art gallery focusing on Latin American and Caribbean artists.

Gortazar also founded "13 The Factory", which designs and manufactures 3D functional objects picture frames and furniture crafted mainly from recycled materials recovered from the streets of London. Gortazar and the company have been commissioned to decorated many restaurants in London., as well as a car dealer.

In 2014, Gortazar continues to create photographs using a 1930s Speed Graphic 5x4 and Century Graphic 6x9", as well as SLR cameras.

== Exhibitions ==
- 1999-2002: Lighthouses, guardians of the waters Castle of los Tres Reyes del Morro, East Havana.
- 2003: My People House of Culture San Agustín, Havana.
- 2004: Cumulus Museum of the Revolution, Old Havana || Cumulus Fama Galery, Old Havana.
- 2006: The Malecón of my Habana Pain de Paris, Havana.
- 2008: Isle of Youth, paradise of dreams II Pain de Paris, Havana.
- 2009: Two Islands Lavanta Galleria, Northampton || Gortazar's first exhibition outside of his home island was Cuba Treasured Island Opus, London. Gortazar was granted special permission to visit protected nature reserves which are inaccessible to visitors. His images included the bee hummingbird, the Cuban woodpecker, wild horses and the Isle of Youth.
- 2010: Latinos in London City Hall, London Gortazar was invited by the Latin American Bicentenary Group and London Mayor Boris Johnson to display in London's City Hall his series of Latinos in London, superimposing digital on film photographs (mixing old and new techniques) taken in his native Cuba and his host City of London to create ten fictional images. || Art Revolution (collective) Acquire Art Gallery, London || Horizons Club Habana, Cuba || Celebrating Cuban Culture opened at the Bolivar Hall, Venezuelan Embassy, London and then travelled for two years across the UK, including Leeds, Manchester, Nottingham and closing October 2011 at the Festival of Ideas, Cambridge.
- 2011: Art Revolution (collective exhibition part of the London Latin American Film Festival) Vibe Gallery, London || Authentic Cuba Boisdale Gallery, Canary Wharf, London || Maasai Bernie Grant Art Centre, London. The Bernie Grant Art Centre presented an exhibition of photographs of Kenya's Maasai people || Jambo Kenya displayed for the first time in Cuba closeup images of the peoples, wildlife and birds of Kenya, which were exhibited for a year at the Galería Genesis, in the Miramar Trade Centre of Havana.
- 2012: Maasai and Cuba Treasured Island 13 The Gallery, London.
- 2013: Samutthana 13 The Gallery, London. A display of photographs taken during his travels in Sri Lanka; landscapes, people and wildlife. The exhibition sought to raise funds for Samutthana (meaning renewal) and the UK-Sri Lanka Trauma Group
- 2014: Las Parrandas de Remedios 13 The Gallery, London. A celebration of Cuban identity and solidarity set to coincide with the London Commission of Enquiry for the Cuban Five. The photographs were taken during an annual celebration in the small town of San Juan de los Remedios.

== Awards ==
In 2013, Gortazar received two LUKAS (Latin UK Awards) for "outstanding contribution" to the arts: Art Exhibition of the Year (for his photographic exhibition Cuba, Treasured Island) and Visual Artist of the Year.
