= Mario Girona =

Cuban architect (1924–2008)

- Born: Mario Miguel Girona Fernández; January 13, 1924; Manzanillo, Granma Province, Cuba
- Died: August 26, 2008 (aged 84); Havana, La Habana Province, Cuba
- Resting place: Colon Cemetery, Havana, Cuba
- Education: University of Havana
- Occupation(s): Architect, educator

Mario Girona (né Mario Miguel Girona Fernández; January 13, 1924 – August 26, 2008) was a Cuban architect and educator. He received a Cuban national award for his architecture in 1996, from the National Union of Construction Architects of Cuba. Girona taught for many years at the University of Havana.

== Life and career ==
Mario Miguel Girona Fernández was born on January 13, 1924, in Manzanillo. His older brother was painter Julio Girona (or Julio Girona Fernández; 1914–2002). In his youth, he was in support of the Cuban Revolution.

In 1940, Girona began his studies at the "Fernando Aguado y Rico Higher School of Trades" in Havana. In 1945, he entered the faculty of architecture at the University of Havana, where he graduated in 1953.

In the 1960s Girona was appointed to carry out an architectural project to design the Coppelia ice cream parlor in the Vedado district of Havana. He participated in the Expo 67 in Montreal in 1967, with his design of a boutique-ice cream parlor. He also became faculty at his alma mater, the University of Havana.

The National Union of Construction Architects of Cuba (Spanish: Unión Nacional de Arquitectos Constructores de Cuba; now UNAICC) awarded him the "National Prize for Life and Work" in 1996.

== Death and legacy ==
On August 26, 2008, Girona died at the age of 84 in Havana. His remains were buried in the Colón Necropolis in Havana.

In 2015, his work was included in the group exhibition, Latin America in Construction: Architecture 1955–1980 at the Museum of Modern Art (MoMA) in New York City.

== List of works ==
- 1957, Hotel Capri, Havana, Cuba
- 1966, Coppelia, Vedado district, Havana, Cuba
- 1966, "Pío Lindo" Country Restaurant, Ciénaga de Zapata, Cuba
- 1974, Hotel MarAzul, Havana, Cuba
- 1975, Las Terrazas, Cayajabos, Habana, Cuba; coffee workers housing
- 1998, Terminal 3, José Marti International Airport, Havana, Cuba

== See also ==
- Max Borges Jr.
