= Palmar de Junco =

Sports venue in Pueblo Nuevo, Matanzas, Cuba

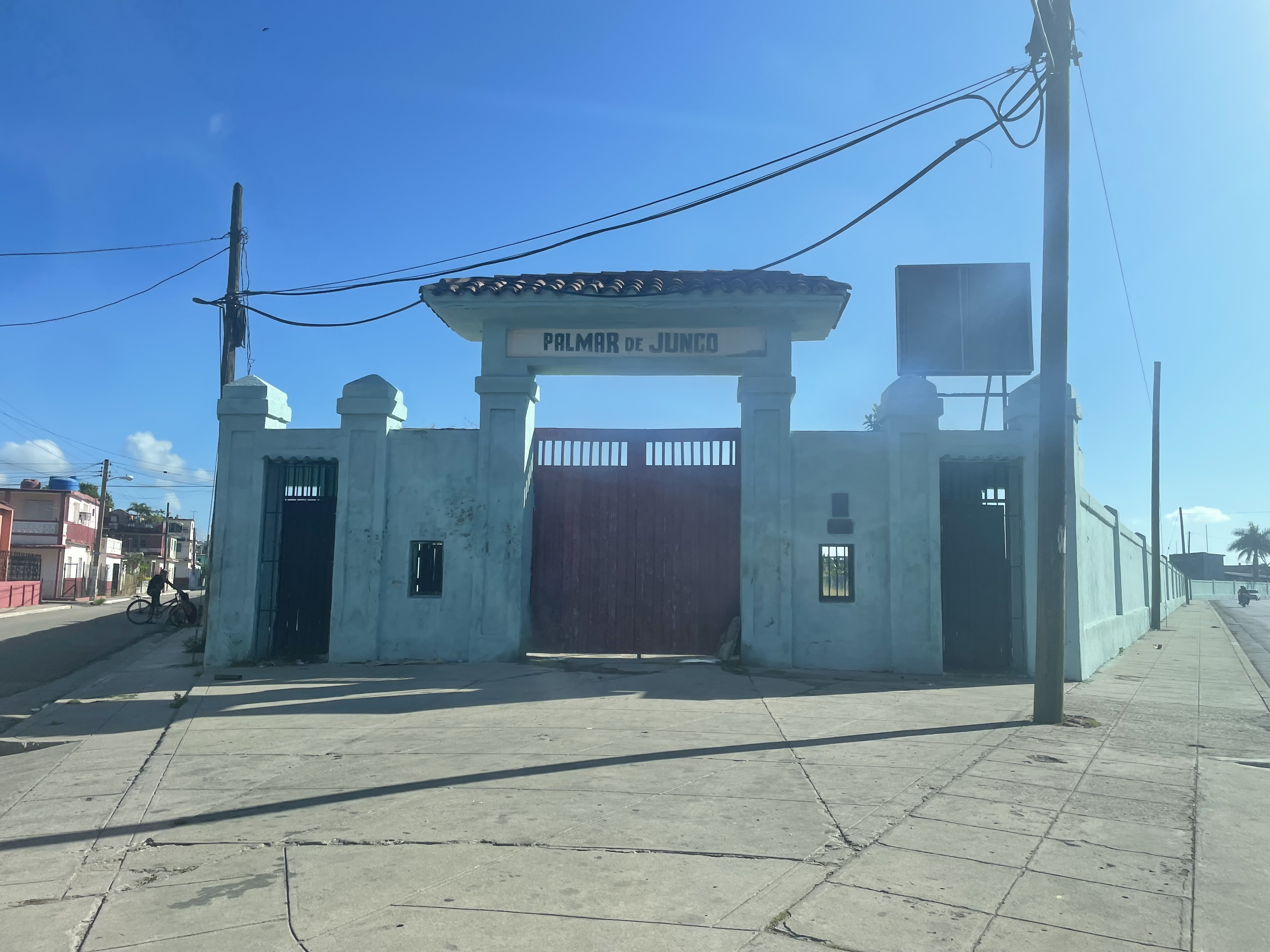
Entrance of the stadium

Palmar de Junco is where in 1874 the first official game of Cuban baseball was played. It was once owned by the del Junco family. It is located at Calzada de Esteban (Calle 171) between Monserrate (Calle 292) and San Ignacio streets (Calle 284) in the neighborhood of Pueblo Nuevo, Matanzas, Cuba.
