= Necropolis de San Carlos Borromeo =

Cemetery in Matanzas, Cuba

Cementerio de San Carlos
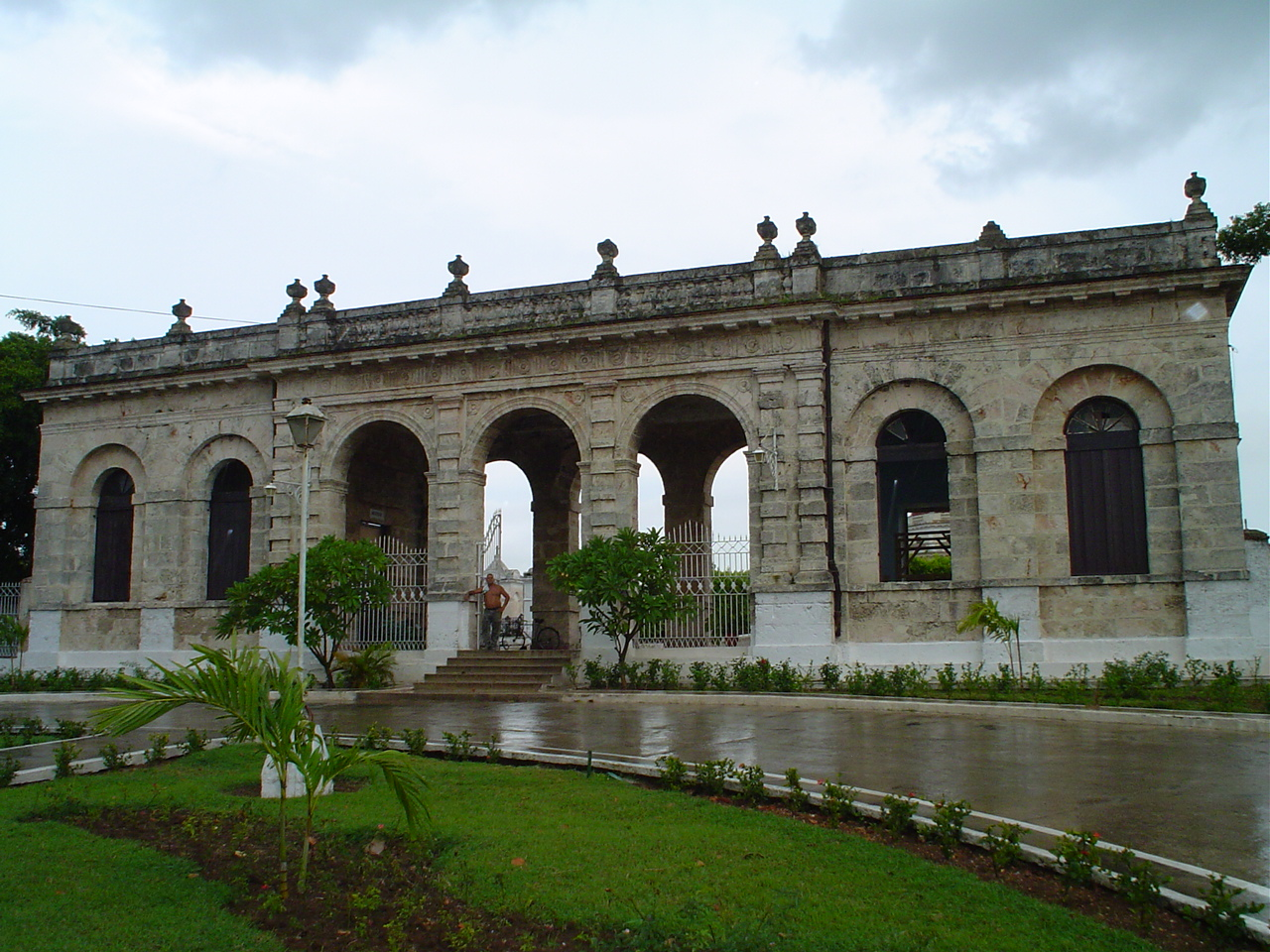
- Necropolis de San Carlos Borromeo (August 2007).
- Interactive map of Cementerio de San Carlos

Details
- Established: 1872
- Location: Matanzas
- Country: Cuba
- Coordinates: 23°01′57″N 81°36′11″W
- Size: 13.5 hectares (33 acres)

Necropolis de San Carlos Borromeo also known as Cementerio de San Carlos or San Carlos Cemetery is located in Matanzas, Cuba. It was inaugurated on September 2, 1872 on 13.5 hectares. It is the third most important Cemetery of Cuba in terms of patrimonial value, as much for its architecture, as for the personalities interred. Its main architect was Francisco Sosa Vélez, who used Carrara marble, bronze and cast iron for the construction.

The San Carlos Cemetery came to solve the problem Matanzas had with the big number of cemeteries in the area, a figure higher than that of any other Cuban location.

The octagonal Chapel contains the remains of the martyrs of different wars of independence. Its catacombs, currently the only ones active on the island, contain 756 niches in two underground pantheons and an exclusive system of ventilation against atmospheric pollution, similar to the Tobias Gallery, in the Colon Cemetery, Havana, in Havana.

== Notable interments ==
- Jose Jacinto Milanés (1814–1863), writer
- Joseph Marion Hernández (1793–1857), United States Congressman (interred in the del Junco family crypt
- Miguel Faílde (1852–1921), musician
- Fernando Heydrich (1827–1903), engineer and sculptor, Builder of the Acueduct of Matanzas
- Bonifacio Byrne (1861–1936), poet
- Severiano Sainz y Bencamo (1871–1937), Catholic bishop
- Alfredo Nicasio Heydrich Martinez (1862–1933), one of the first producers of Sisal on the island
