= Teatro Miramar =

Cinema in Havana, Cuba

Coordinates: 23.1010°N 82.4468°W

The Teatro Miramar (Miramar Theatre) also known as the Cine Miramar is a former cinema located in Miramar, Havana, Cuba near Quinta Avenida (5th Avenue) and Calle 94.

Built in the 1950s, the 600-seat movie house was still in use as a cultural centre for the local community until the early 1990s, but the collapse of the Soviet Union as one of Cuba's main trading partners, coupled with the United States embargo against Cuba made it impossible to obtain the equipment needed for essential repair work to the theatre. Originally built as a movie house, over time the building was annexed to a self-service market and a Howard Johnson Cafeteria. Like most buildings in Cuba, it has been battered by hurricanes and degraded by humidity. However, due to a chronic shortage of funds the theatre never received the regular maintenance required in that climate, and fell into decay.

== Restoration efforts ==
Restoration efforts began in 2010, and were completed the following year.
