= Rosa Lowinger =

American writer and art conservator

Rosa Lowinger is a noted Cuban-born American writer, curator and art conservator. She is the author of Tropicana Nights: The Life and Times of the Legendary Cuban Nightclub, and various articles on Cuban culture, modern art and architecture. She is considered an expert in Cuba cultural travel, specializing in trips that focus on 1950s nightlife, contemporary art and architecture.

== Personal life and education ==
Born to a Jewish family, her grandparents fled the Holocaust and eventually settled in Miami. Lowinger is an alumnus of Brandeis University, receiving a Bachelor of Arts in fine arts and art history in 1978. She received a Master of Arts in art history and a certificate in art conservation from the New York University Institute of Fine Arts in 1982.

== Career ==
Lowinger is considered a leader in the field of conservation of built heritage, a subject which includes art, architecture, museum collections and public spaces. She has been in private practice since 1982, first in Philadelphia, then in Charleston, South Carolina. In 1988, she founded Sculpture Conservation Studio in Los Angeles and served as its chief conservator and principal until 1998, when she sold the firm to concentrate more on writing. She remained active as the firm's senior conservator through 2008, supervising most of its large scale architectural projects, most notably the conservation of Helen Lundeberg's "History of Transportation" mural in Inglewood, CA. She is the lead conservator for the preservation of Miami's Marine Stadium (Hilario Candela, 1963) and curated a 2013 exhibit on the stadium at the Coral Gables Museum titled "Concrete Paradise: Miami Marine Stadium." In 2016 she co-curated "Promising Paradise: Cuban Allure, American Seduction" at the Wolfsonian Museum in Miami Beach.

In 2008 she was awarded the 2008–2009 Rome Prize in Conservation from the American Academy in Rome to research the history of vandalism against art and public space.

In that same year she parted ways with Sculpture Conservation Studio and formed Rosa Lowinger and Associates (RLA), a conservation firm with an international focus and offices in Miami and Los Angeles. RLA's clients include a wide range of public and private entities including the Los Angeles Metropolitan Transit Authority Gold Line to Pasadena, the Hawaii State Foundation on Culture and the Arts, Vizcaya Museum and Gardens, the Lowe Art Museum at the University of Miami, The Huntington Library in San Marino, California, the Frost Art Museum at the Florida International University and the cities of Los Angeles, Miami, Miami Beach, Coral Gables, Santa Monica, Santa Fe Springs, Inglewood, and Honolulu.

In the aftermath of the 2010 Haiti earthquake, Lowinger and paintings conservator Viviana Dominguez were hired by the Smithsonian Institution and Haiti Cultural Recovery Center to remove the three remaining murals of the collapsed Cathedral of Sainte Trinité in Port-au-Prince. These murals included the Last Supper murals by Philome Obin, the Procession to Cana by Préfète Duffaut and the Baptism of Christ by Castera Bazile.

"Tropicana Nights: The Life and Times of the Legendary Cuban Nightclub" is a non-fiction account of Cuba's celebrated 1950s nightclub. Published in 2005, and co-authored by Ofelia Fox, widow of Tropicana's owner Martin Fox, Tropicana Nights is considered the definitive book on Havana's nightlife in the pre-Castro era and the source of much original material used in other books about the period. Lowinger's research on the Mafia's involvement in Havana's casinos has led to her being a lead source in The History Channel's Declassified:Godfathers of Havana. Lowinger is also author "The Encanto File", a play about blackmail in Miami that was produced at the Judith Anderson Theater by the Women's Project and Productions and numerous articles on contemporary Cuban art.

Lowinger is an associate editor of the University of Pennsylvania's architectural conservation academic journal "Change Over Time" and wrote under the pseudonym of The Art Nurse on art blog c-monster.net's conservation question and answer section.

She also reviews books for the web magazine Truthdig.com.

== Honors ==
- 2008 – Rome Prize in Conservation from the American Academy in Rome 2008–2009 to research the history of vandalism against art and public space.
- 2008 – Los Angeles Conservancy Preservation Award for Conservation of History of Transportation, a 240-foot petrachrome WPA mural by Helen Lundeberg in Inglewood, California
- 2005 – Amistad Foundation, Cross-cultural understanding award for "Tropicana Nights: The Life and Times of the Legendary Cuban Nightclub"
- 2001 – Los Angeles Conservancy Preservation Award for Conservation of Vanishing Race, a 1930 cast-stone Works Progress Administration sculpture
- 2000 – Getty Preserve L.A. Award For Assessment of damage to History of Transportation, mural
- 1998 – California Preservation Foundation for conservation of Portal of the Folded Wings, 1926 cast stone and ceramic tile aviation monument in Burbank, California
- 1997 – Los Angeles Conservancy Preservation Award For conservation of Portal of the Folded Wings
