= Coppelia (ice cream parlor) =

Cuban ice cream parlor

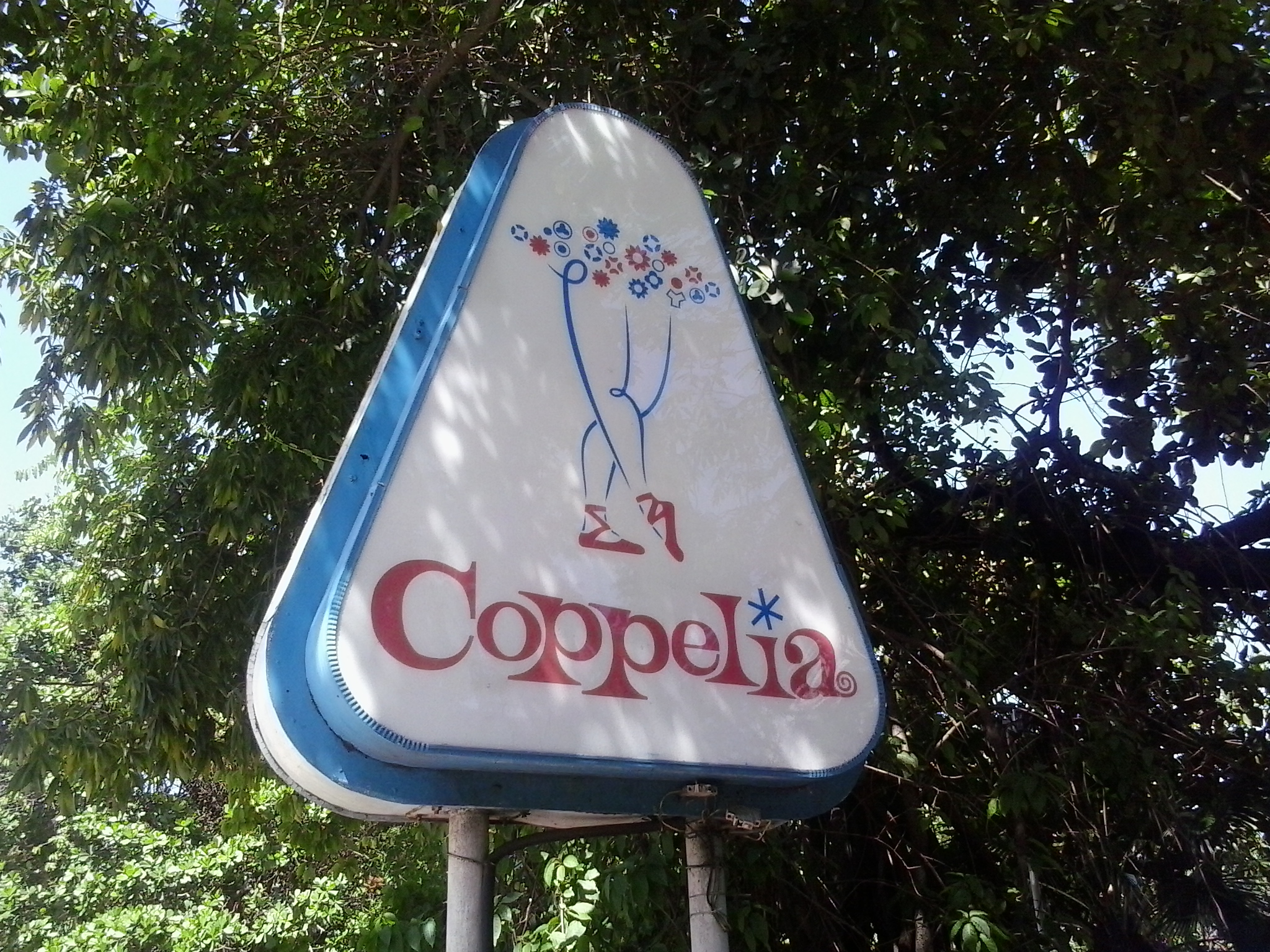
- Company type: State-owned
- Industry: Food processing
- Founded: June 4, 1966; 60 years ago
- Founder: Fidel Castro
- Headquarters: Vedado, Havana City, Cuba
- Area served: Nationwide
- Key people: Mario Girona (1966 architect)
- Products: Ice cream
- Owner: Government of Cuba
- Parent: GAESA

Coppelia is an ice cream parlor chain in Cuba, named after the ballet Coppélia. Originally built in a project led by Fidel Castro, Coppelia is state-run and sells in Cuban pesos (CUP). Havana's Coppelia employs more than 400 workers and serves 16,000 litres (4,200 US gal) of ice cream to 35,000 customers each day. It is known as Havana's "Cathedral of Ice Cream".

When business started in 1966, it ran with a count of 26 flavors and 25 combinations. Today, lines are generally long and the supply and selection of flavors is scarce, with usually only one or two available at any given time.

== History ==
Coppelia was originally built in a project led by Fidel Castro. Fidel's longtime secretary, Celia Sánchez, named Coppelia after her favorite ballet Coppélia.

The site of the first Coppelia was originally taken by the Reina Mercedes Hospital, which functioned from 1886 to 1954 when it was demolished. Originally, there were plans to build another hospital on the site, but plans later changed and a 50-story skyscraper was to be built on the site, but all these plans fell through. A tourism promotion pavilion, Parque INIT, then occupied the site, then the Centro Recreativo Nocturnal (night-time entertainment center), before Coppelia finally took over.

Mario Girona was the architect of the new ice cream palace built on the site in 1966. The building was influenced by the biomorphic modernism of Italian, Mexican and South American modernists like Pier Luigi Nervi, Felix Candela and Oscar Niemeyer, who saw the opportunity to leave behind the rectangular forms of the steel high rises and utilize the plasticity of reinforced concrete. Populist ideology helped shape the design and use of the public space.

=== Expansion ===
In March 2012 Venezuela announced plans to cooperate with Cuba to build a Coppelia ice cream plant in the country and introduce sales of the product there. In April of the same year the Cuban newspaper Trabajadores ran an article exposing the scarcity and poor quality of the product as well as the inattentive service at the parlor, despite the recently completed renovations. Among the problems were broken freezers.

=== Difficulties ===
In February 2025, Coppelia reopened after a three-month closure prompted by economic difficulties and pricing adjustments, with expanded flavors and higher prices, amid an economic crisis in the country. At the time of its closure, Coppelia was only able to serve a single ice cream flavor.

== Location ==
Havana's Coppelia is a Cuban Revolution modernist building. It features five white granite discs annexed to one great helicoidal staircase, with wood and tinted glass division panels, all under one big round roof supported by twelve reinforced concrete arachnid columns. The flying-saucer-shaped building represents a UFO and is one of the largest ice cream parlors in the world. Holding a maximum of 1000 guests, it is located on the part of Calle 23 known as La Rampa in the Vedado district, and occupies the entire city block between Calles 23 and 21, and Calles K and L.

Coppelia has a capacity for 547 patrons.

Coppelia Havana has been a major city landmark for both locals and visitors since its opening in 1966, but acquired additional fame when it was featured in one of the most widely viewed Cuban films, Strawberry and Chocolate.

The park area surrounding the building features lush groundcover and a canopy of towering banyan trees which provide shade for open-air dining areas. Curvilinear paths lead to an elevated circular pavilion inside of which the only indoor seating is located.

== Gallery ==
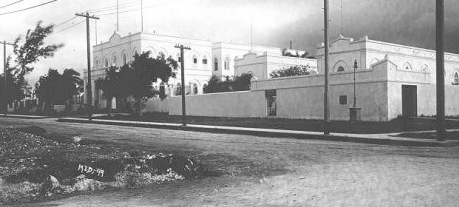
1908 view of the Hospital Reina Mercedes, which occupied the site before Coppelia.

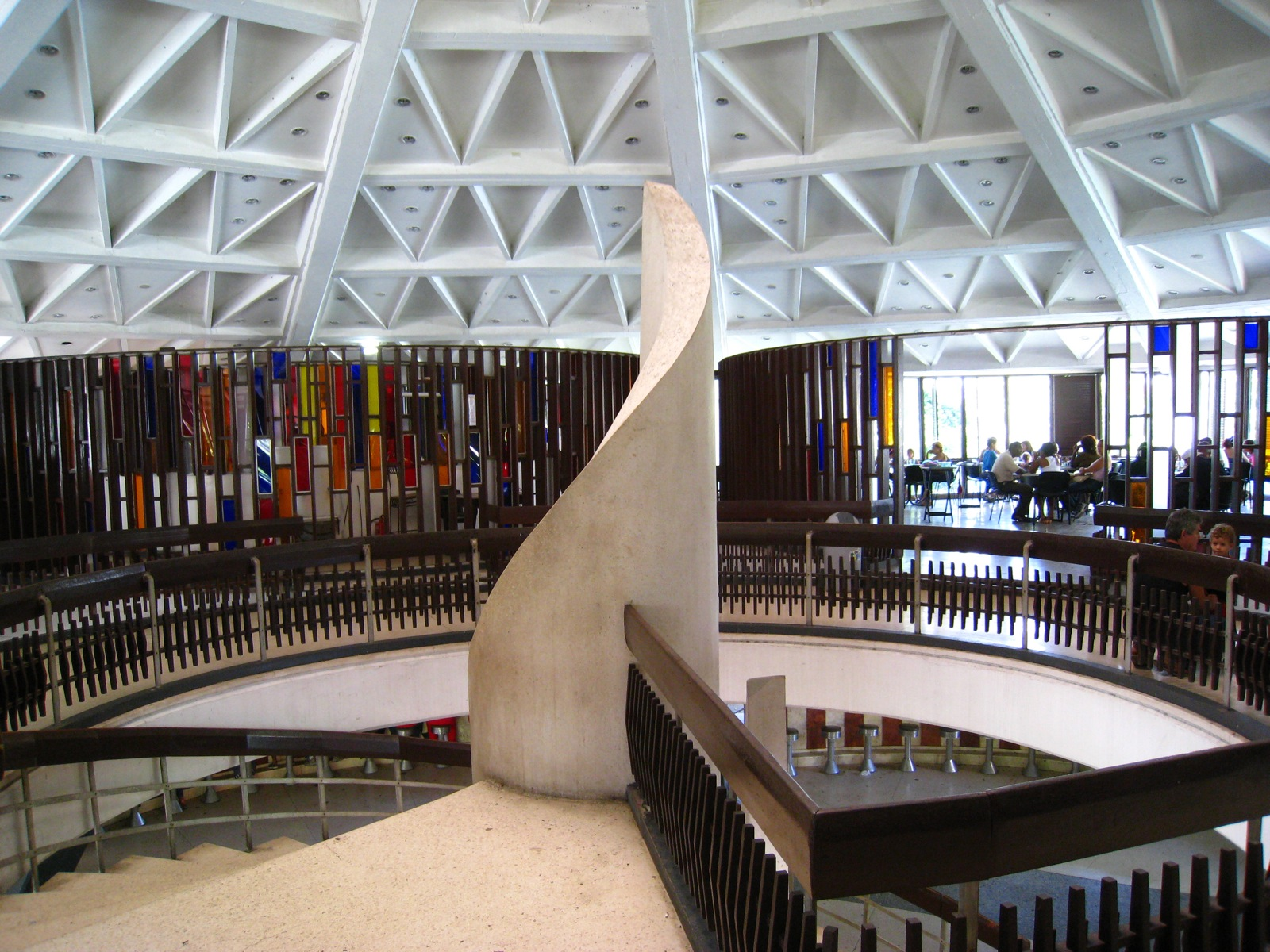
Interior detail, Coppelia Havana.

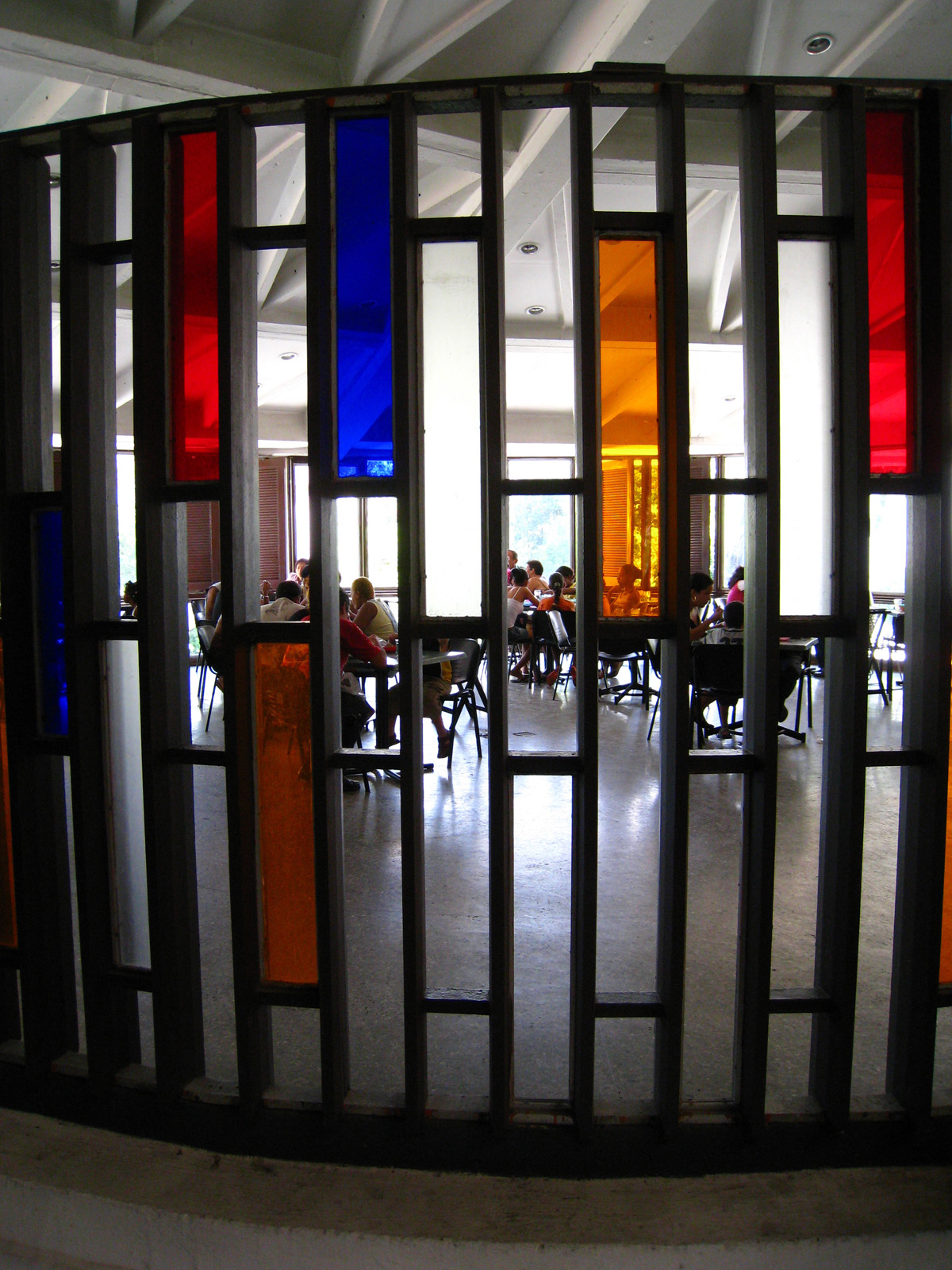
Interior detail, Coppelia Havana.

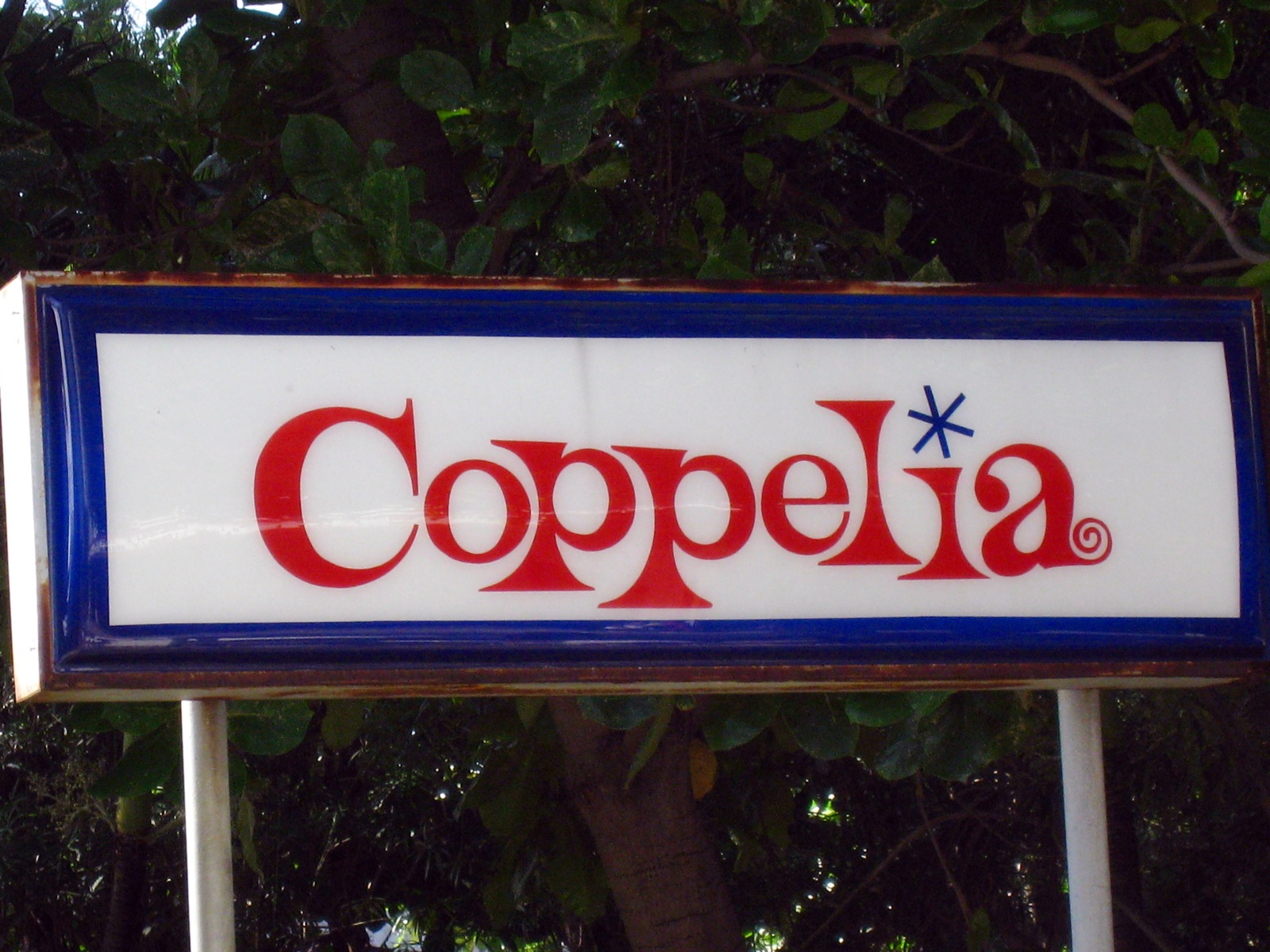
Old logotype at Coppelia Havana.

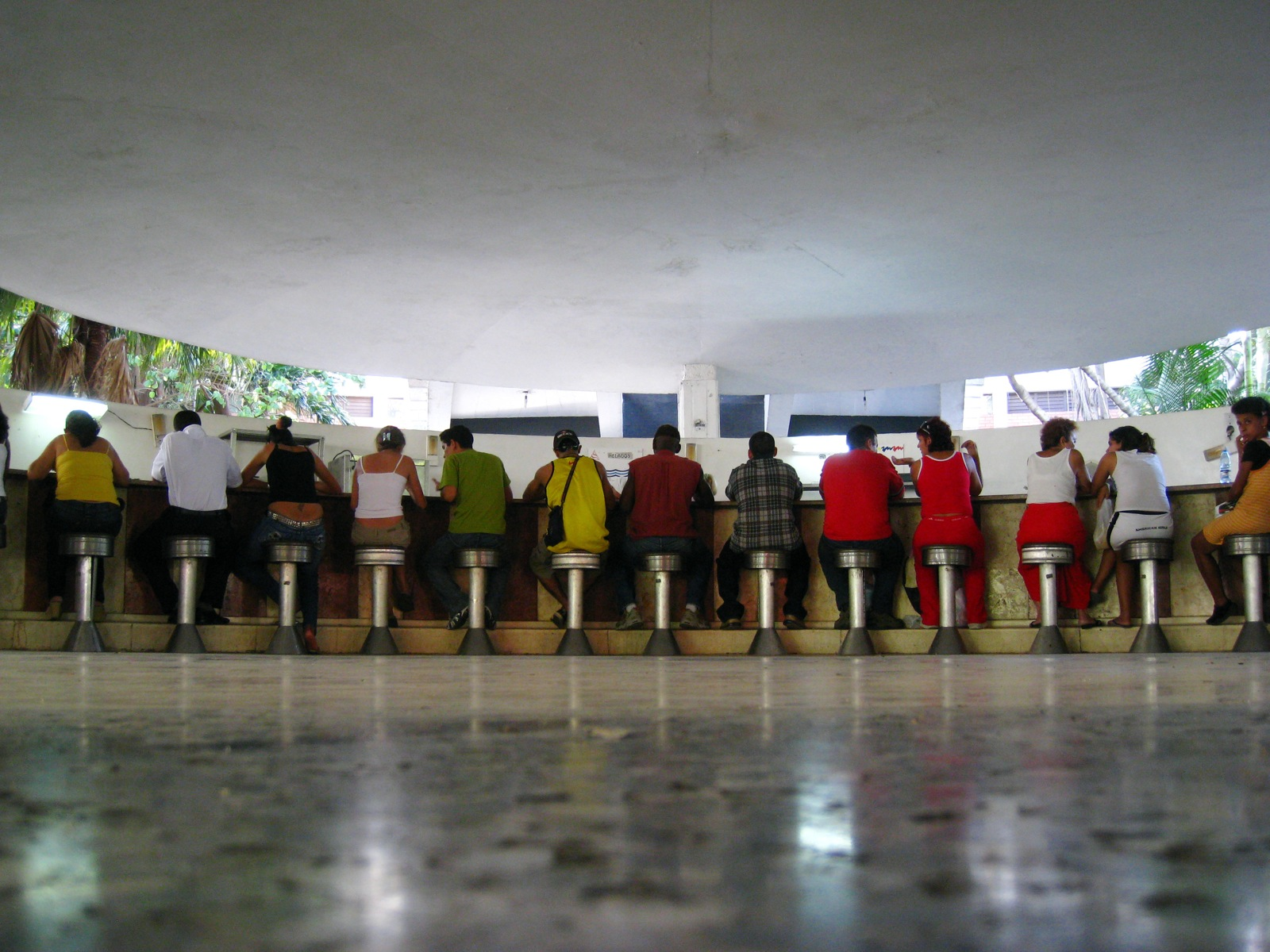
Detail of one of the lounges, Havana.

== See also ==
- Ubre Blanca
