= International School of Havana =

Location
- Havana; Cuba
- Coordinates: 23°7′25.9″N 82°25′10.9″W

Information
- School type: International School
- Founded: 1965
- Founder: Phyllis Powers OBE
- Gender: Coed
- Age range: 2.5–18
- Enrollment: 261
- Average class size: 14
- Student to teacher ratio: 1:6
- Classes offered: Pre-Kinder – 12
- Language: English
- Campus type: Suburban
- Houses: Dolphins, Sharks and Rays
- Accreditation: CIS, NEASC & IBO DP
- National ranking: 1
- Graduates: 98%
- Affiliation: CIE Fellowship Centre
- Website: www.ishavana.org

The International School of Havana (ISH) is an international school in Cuba, located in Miramar, Havana.

== History ==
ISH was founded in 1965 by Phyllis Powers, a British expatriate, to educate the children of diplomatic missions' staff. In 1974, overall control was taken over by a committee of representatives of foreign embassies and organisations, and it was "The Foreign Students' School", although Powers remained headteacher until her retirement in 1982. In 1988, the school relocated to larger premises and assumed its present name: International School of Havana.

== Structure, curriculum, and enrollment ==
The school has two divisions: Lower School Section (early years to grade 5) and Secondary School Section (grades 6–12). Primary Section students prepare for IPC, IPM and English National Standards. Secondary Section students prepare for Cambridge International Examinations, IGCSE examinations and the International Baccalaureate Organization's Diploma Programme. The school is accredited by the New England Association of Schools and Colleges and the Council of International Schools.

ISH is the only accredited school for children of expatriates in Havana that offers education through the medium of the English language. Its campus includes student play areas, purpose-built classrooms and other facilities, such as computer laboratories and library in addition to classrooms in the older original houses.

The International School of Havana enrols (November 2020) some 260 students from 47 nationalities and academic programmes taught in English, that run from the pre-kinder (age 2½) to grade 12 (pre-university graduation).

== Pre-kinder ==
Pre-kinder students rejoined the main campus in August 2019.

== Primary school ==
In the primary section of the Primary School – kindergarten to grade 5 – programmes in English, mathematics and Spanish language (offered at beginner, intermediate and first language levels) are complemented by the International Primary Curriculum (IPC) which has themed Units of Enquiry which are supported by courses in music, art, drama, PE and information technology. The standards of the National Curriculum of England and Wales and the province of Ontario, Canada, were taken into account in the formulation of the English, mathematics and other parts of the curriculum offering apart from the IPC and all programs have specific learning objectives for students at each grade level. The mathematics course is Improving Primary Mathematics which was developed in the London Borough of Barking and Dagenham, UK, from a programme devised in Switzerland. It is adapted to meet the needs of students. Since 2011, students in grade 5 can choose to study Spanish or French.

== Secondary school ==
Secondary School (grades 6 to 12) courses initially lead to the CIE Checkpoint examinations, which are taken by the students at the end of grade 8 in English, mathematics and science.

In grades 5 and 10, students follow courses from the CIE's internationally recognised IGCSE programme in which students are externally examined at the end of Grade 10.

In grades 11 and 12, students follow the courses of the International Baccalaureate Organisation in conjunction with the ISH Graduation Diploma which both prepare students for university matriculation. The school is authorized by the IBO. The school began teaching the International Baccalaureate Diploma programme in August 2006. The Diploma is recognised in a large number of countries around the world as a university matriculation qualification and many universities offer course exemptions and credits to undergraduate students who are admitted holding this award.

== Sports ==
ISH has been trying to put their students into different types of sports such as football, basketball, tennis, swimming, and many others. The school has also been participating against the Spanish school and French school mostly for football and basketball competitions. ISH took part in a football tournament in 2017 which reached the final but lost to the Spanish school. The school, annually, organizes events such as the 'Athletics festival, triathlon, and swimming competitions to compete with other international schools.

== Staff ==
The professional staff is composed of 35% expatriate teachers from Canada, England, Wales, the Netherlands, Germany, India, Australia and other countries and the remainder are recruited locally. All locally recruited staff are required to become trained and qualified in the CIE Diploma for Teachers and Trainers and are thus trained in modern pedagogical methods. Ongoing training is supported by an academic staff professional development programme.

The school was awarded the status of an International Fellowship Centre by Cambridge International Examinations in 2004. The school is a progressive institution and remains closely linked to the various international educational institutions of which it is a member.

== See also ==
- Education in Cuba
