= Max Borges del Junco =

Cuban architect (1890–1963)

Max Borges y del Junco
- Born: May 29, 1890; Jaruco, Cuba
- Died: June 9, 1963 (aged 73); Arlington, Virginia, U.S.

Maximino de la Luz Borges y del Junco (May 29, 1890 in Jaruco, Cuba - June 9, 1963, Arlington, VA) was a well-known Cuban architect and Minister of Public Works during the presidency of Dr. Federico Laredo Brú of Cuba.

He graduated as an engineer in 1916 and as an architect (in 1917). His first company was “Construcciones Max Borges” later renamed “Max Borges e Hijos”. He was married first to Enriqueta Recio y Heymann in 1917 and they had three sons, Alberto (Plastic Surgeon...M.D., F.A.C.S., F.I.C.S.) and Enrique and Max Borges Recio both architects who joined their father in his firm). He later married Josefina Seiglie (in 1937) and they had Josefina and Ana Maria Borges y Seiglie.
