= Martin Fox (businessman) =

Martin Fox was a gambling operator and owner of the Tropicana Club in Havana, Cuba. He has been described as "an important business partner and conduit between the Cuban and U.S. underworld figures who came to make up the Havana Mob".

== Biography ==
=== Early life ===
Fox was from the Cuban province of Matanzas. He got a job working at a sugar mill. However, after an industrial accident injured his left hand he was let go. Subsequently, he got involved in the bolita, rising through the ranks over time. Fox became one of the wealthiest boliteros in all of Cuba, although it was illegal, he was enabled via payoffs to the Cuban police. He established a friendship with Santiago Rey, the Minister for the Interior and Defense, who granted him a concession to bring slot machines to Cuba.

=== Tropicana Club ===
In 1950 Fox purchased the Tropicana Club, a major venue in Havana frequented by celebrities and organized crime. Fox began construction on an indoor cabaret for the club, hiring the architect Max Borges Jr., who produced the Acros de Cristal (Crystal Arches). Previously Fox had commissioned Borges to design his Havana home, one of the first Cuban buildings to combine International Style Modernism with Colonial architecture. He also partnered with Cubana Airlines, an airplane the "Tropicana Special" made direct flights every Thursday from Miami to Havana. The pianist Liberace played at the Tropicana on one occasion at Fox's invitation. In 1957 he welcomed the gangster Albert Anastasia, who received the best table at the Tropicana. Fox was also a member of the Cuban Executives Club. In the summer of 1959 it was visited by Jack Ruby, later to kill Lee Harvey Oswald, when he was taken there by his friend Lewis McWillie, casino manager for the Tropicana. Ruby spent several nights at the club and Fox took him out for a night in Havana. Later when Fox travelled to Dallas to collect a debt, he invited Ruby to dine with him at a Chinese restaurant in Love Field.

In the early hours of New Year's Day, 1959, the Tropicana was bombed, with a 17 year old girl Megaly Martinez suffering a severed arm. Fox felt guilty and visited Martinez at the hospital, paying her hospital bills. Fox later concluded, after being unable to find the perpetrators, that Martinez had bombed his club out of sympathy with Castro and that there had been a premature detonation. After Fidel Castro took power following the Cuban Revolution, Fox's fortunes changed. In coordination with casino manager Lewis McWillie, he moved significant sums of money out Cuba, depositing them in US banks between 1959 and 1960. Eventually Castro confiscated the Tropicana.

Fox was a personal friend of Santo Trafficante Jr., boss of the Trafficante crime family in Florida, who owned the casino at the Tropicana and frequently dined there. Fox visited him in Tampa, Florida. Beginning in 1954 Trafficante started to curry favor with Fox. His wife Ofelia received a silver mink coat with the note "Wishing you a very happy second anniversary". When Trafficante was arrested by Castro he made attempts to get him out of prison. During his days in Havana he came to know the policeman José Miguel Battle Sr., later to found the Cuban-American mafia, also known as The Corporation. Fox made monthly payments of 5,000 pesos to the chief of police José Salas Cafiizares, sometimes delivered by Battle himself. He also introduced Battle to Trafficante. Fox also knew the Lucchese crime family's Frankie Carbo of New York, who he and his wife dined with there.

=== United States ===
After the revolution Fox left Cuba for Miami, Florida. In June 1960 he founded the New Tropicana Corporation with his brother Pedro. In late October 1961 Fox was subpoenaed to testify regarding his relationship to the Boston gangster Johnny Williams. Fox was not himself under investigation for any criminal wrongdoing, however the court was interested in a series of payments he made to Williams for running bingo games at the Tropicana in the late 1950s.

== Personal life ==
In 1952 he married Ofelia Fox. They had no children.

In 1963 he suffered a stroke, he died three years later in 1966.
