= Tropicana Club =

El Tropicana
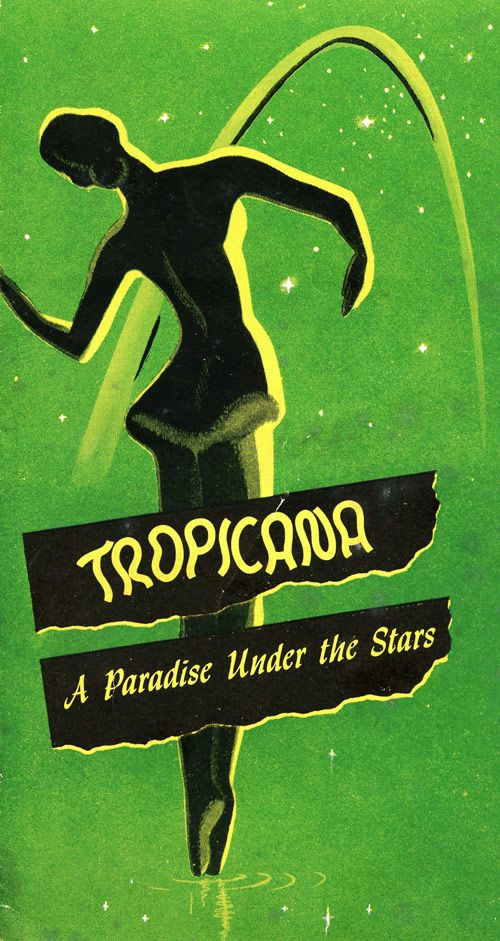
- Tropicana Logo, 1950s

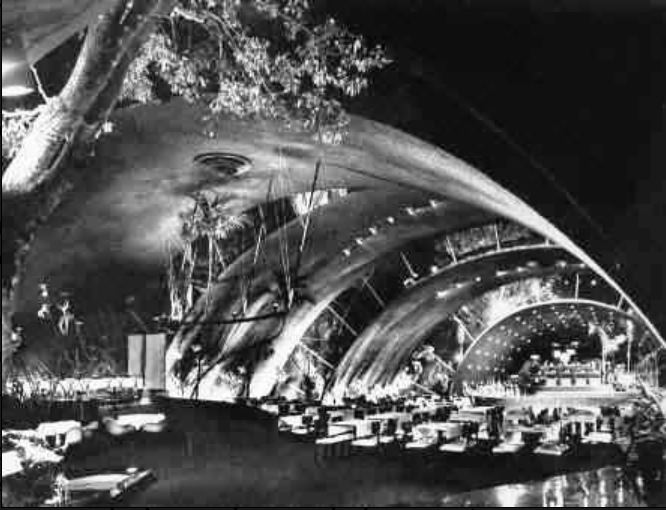
- Arcos de Cristal in the 1950s
- Interactive map of the El Tropicana area
- Former names: Edén Concert

General information
- Type: Cabaret
- Architectural style: Modern
- Location: Marianao, Calle 72 esq a Calle 43, Marianao, La Habana, Ciudad de La Habana, Cuba
- Coordinates: 23°05′39″N 82°25′08″W
- Opened: December 30, 1939
- Renovated: 1951
- Client: Martin Fox
- Owner: Cuban government

Height
- Height: 90'

Technical details
- Structural system: Thin shell concrete
- Material: Reinforced concrete
- Floor count: 5 Arches
- Grounds: 36,000-square-meter estate

Design and construction
- Architect: Max Borges Jr.
- Other designers: Charles and Ray Eames, chairs
- Awards: Colegio Nacional de Arquitectos, Cuba
- Designations: 1953 Premio Anual
- Known for: Thin shell structures

Other information
- Number of rooms: Seating capacity 1,700

El Tropicana Night Club
- exterior, daylight, 1 January 1959

El Tropicana Night Club in Havana, Cuba located in a lush, 36,000-square-metre (390,000 sq ft) estate tropical garden opened on December 30, 1939 at the Villa Mina in Marianao. It is located next door to the old Colegio de Belén, Havana, presently, the Instituto Técnico Militar.

== History ==
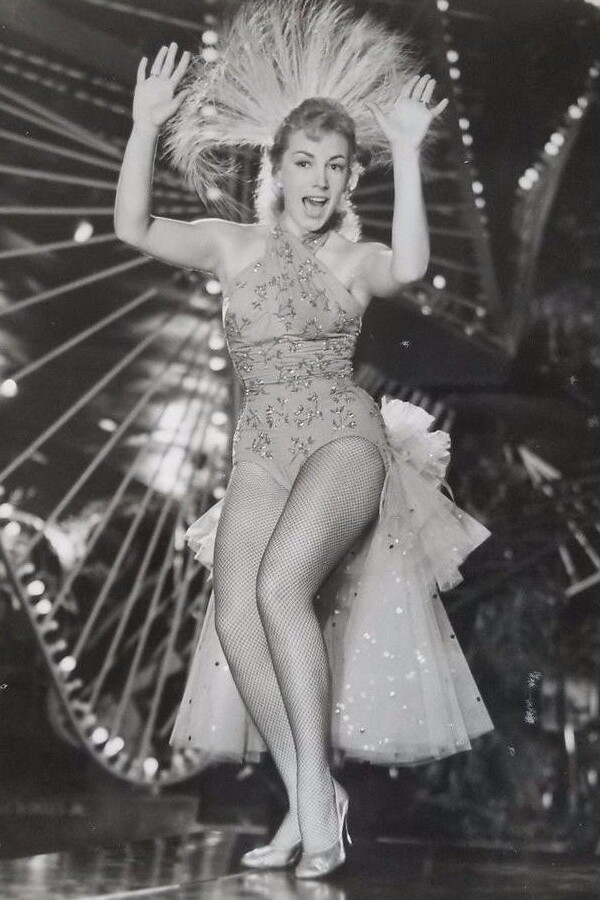
Mexican actress and singer Evangelina Elizondo during a performance at the club, c. 1950s

The Tropicana evolved out of a nightclub called Edén Concert, operated in the late 1930s by the late Cuban impresario Victor de Correa. The club was a combination casino and cabaret located on a rented property in Marianao from Guillermina Pérez Chaumont, known as Mina. The tropical gardens of the Villa Mina provided a natural setting for an outdoor cabaret. In December 1939, de Correa moved his company of singers, dancers and musicians into a converted mansion located on the estate. De Correa provided the food and entertainment, while Rafael Mascaro and Luis Bular operated the casino located in the chandeliered dining room of the estate's mansion. Costumes designed by Juan Emilio Daudinot. Originally known as El Beau-Site, de Correa decided to rename it The Tropicana. With a fanfare from the Alfredo Brito Orchestra El Tropicana opened on December 30, 1939.

In 1950 Martin Fox, a gambler who rented table space in the casino, took over the lease of what would become The Tropicana. He hired Max Borges Jr. to design an expansion that would be known as Los Arcos de Cristal (Crystal Arches). Fox partnered with Cubana Airlines, an airplane the "Tropicana Special" made direct flights every Thursday from Miami to Havana. In April 1953 the Cuban government arrested a dozen North Americans who were suspected of running fraudulent games at the Tropicana, and also the Sans Souci and the Jockey Club. Eleven of them were deported. The casino was owned by mafia boss Santo Trafficante Jr., who appointed Meyer Lansky associate Dino Cellini to run it. Through his ownership Trafficante deepened his connection to Cuban gangsters who were running the establishment.

The club became a major venue in Havana frequented by celebrities and organized crime. The pianist Liberace played at the Tropicana on one occasion. In 1957 it welcomed the gangster Albert Anastasia, who received the best table at the Tropicana. In the summer of 1959 it was visited by Jack Ruby, later to kill Lee Harvey Oswald, when he was taken there by his friend Lewis McWillie, casino manager for the Tropicana. Ruby spent several nights at the club and owner Martin Fox took him out for a night in Havana.

In the early hours of New Year's Day, 1959, the Tropicana was bombed, with a 17 year old girl Megaly Martinez suffering a severed arm. The owner Martin Fox felt guilty and visited Martinez at the hospital, paying her hospital bills. Fox later concluded, after being unable to find the perpetrators, that Martinez had bombed his club out of sympathy with Castro and that there had been a premature detonation. After Fidel Castro took power following the Cuban Revolution, Fox's fortunes changed. In coordination with casino manager Lewis McWillie, he moved significant sums of money out Cuba, depositing them in US banks between 1959 and 1960. Eventually Castro confiscated the Tropicana.

== Architecture ==
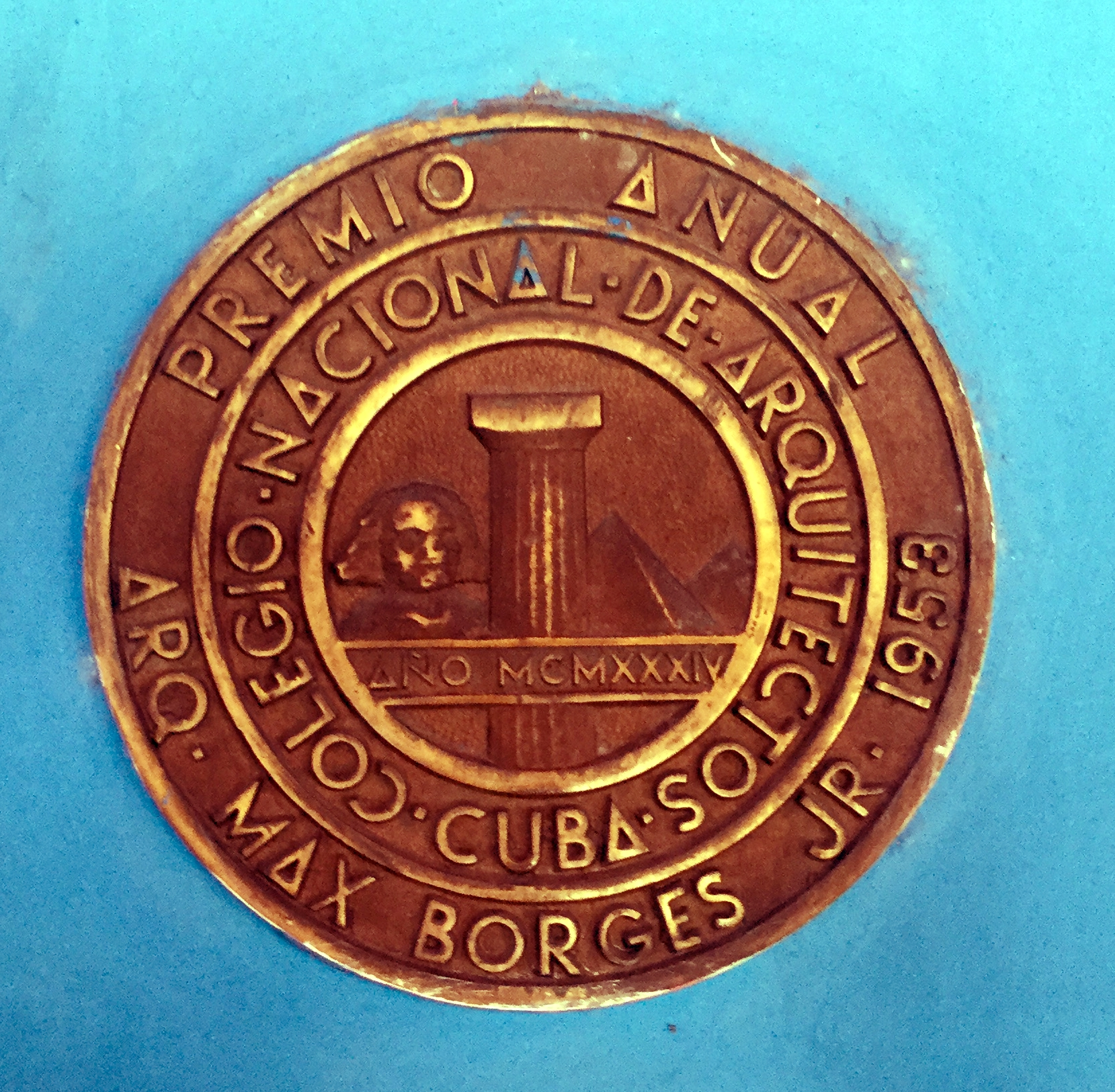
Colegio de Arquitectos Premio, 1953

Max Borges designed a building composed of five reinforced concrete arches and glass walls over an indoor stage. When the indoor cabaret opened on March 15, 1952, it had a combined total seating capacity of 1,700 for the interior and outside areas. The furniture was designed by Charles and Ray Eames. The Arcos de Cristal won numerous international prizes. The Tropicana was one of six Cuban buildings included in the 1954 Museum of Modern Art exhibit entitled Latin American Architecture since 1945. Henry Russell Hitchcock wrote the book Latin American architecture since 1945 for the occasion. (Note: Henry Russell Hitchcock, Latin American architecture since 1945, Page 108-109. Text, photo and floor plan of Tropicana Night Club.) Borges won the Premio Anual, from the Colegio de Arquitectos in 1953 for his work on the Tropicana. The Arcos de Cristal can be seen in the Tropicana scene of the movie Our Man In Havana.

== See also ==
- Max Borges Jr.
- Club Náutico
- Colegio de Belén, Havana

== Gallery ==
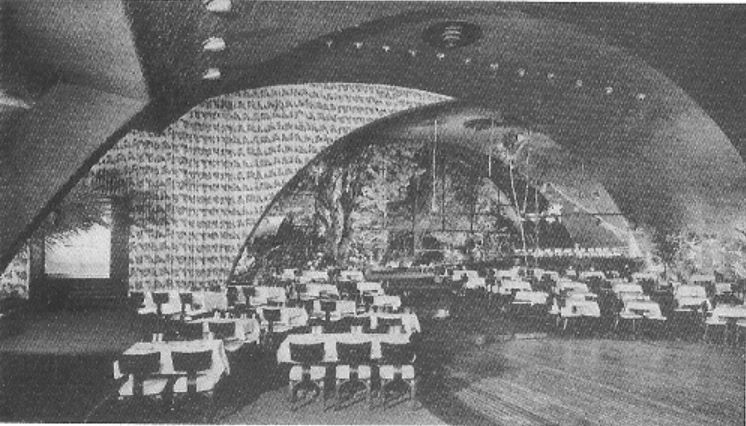
Image of Tropicana showing Eames chairs.

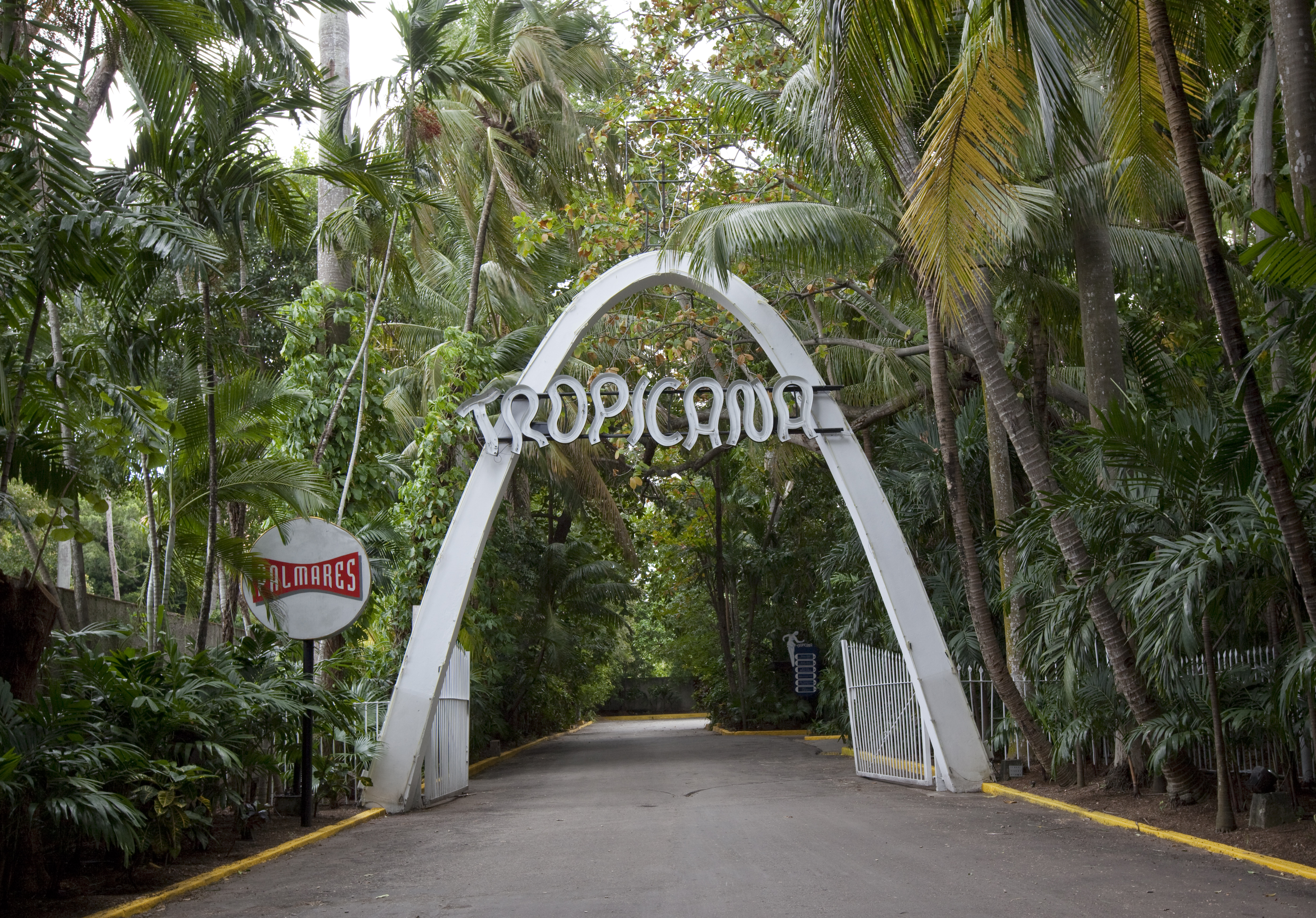
