= Club Náutico =

Club Náutico de Marianao
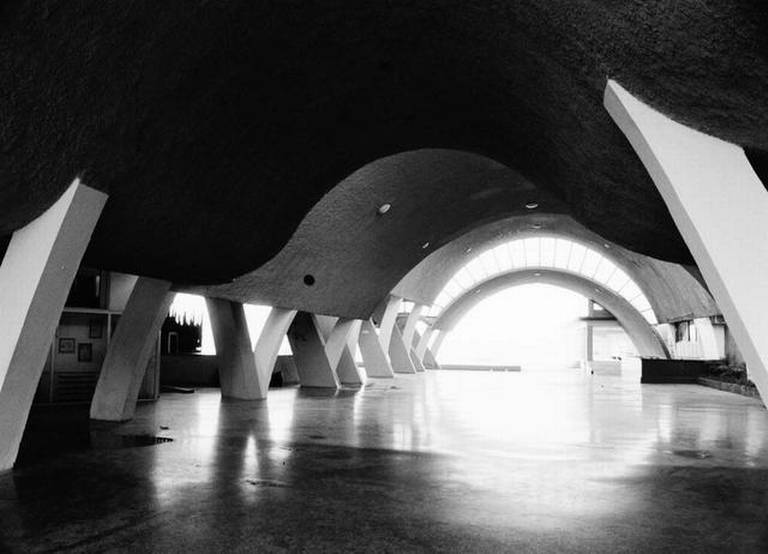
- Arches at Club Náutico, 1953
- Interactive map of the Club Náutico de Marianao area
- Former names: Club de las Panteras

General information
- Type: Recreation
- Architectural style: Modern
- Location: Playa, Havana, terminus of 152 (off 5ta Avenida), Ciudad de La Habana, Cuba
- Coordinates: 23°5′37″N 82°27′35″W
- Inaugurated: 1953
- Owner: Carlos A. Fernández Campos

Dimensions
- Diameter: 20'

Technical details
- Structural system: Arches
- Material: Reinforced concrete
- Floor count: 1

Design and construction
- Architect: Max Borges Recio

Club Náutico (‘Nautical Club’) is a private club in Cuba used by members of government unions since being nationalized by the government in the 1960s. It is in the reparto (city ward) of Náutico, Playa, Havana.

== History ==
Club Náutico was built in the 1920s and expanded in 1936 by its owner Carlos Fernández. Guests paid a modest fee (.10 cents), eventually there were more than five thousand subscribers. Fernández had in addition to the enjoyment of a short beach, a dance floor with an orchestra. By the 1950s, an increase in membership necessitated expansion of the original premises and in 1953 Max Borges Recio designed a set of porticos covered by vaults similar to the ones he recently had designed for the Tropicana.

Ownership of Club Náutico was seized by the government in the 1960s, and the club was converted into the Félix Elmuza Workers' Social Circle. As a Workers' Social Circle, it was used as a private club for members of government unions and has fallen into disrepair through decades of neglect. In 2018, the Ministry of Tourism announced a plan to convert the sites into tourist destinations.

== Architecture ==
Borges used a catenary arch, similar to those used in the Tropicana.

There is a color differentiation at the Club Náutico between the blue, and smooth surface of the architectural covering of the arch and the white structure above. The arches at the Club Náutico lack the architectural and structural purity that Borges achieved at the Tropicana as most of the arches there are for the most part self-supporting. Here as in the Tropicana Borges used the difference in height between arches to insert a clear glass skylight. The floors are polished concrete.
