= Miramar Trade Center (Havana) =

The Miramar Trade Center is a mixed-use office and retail real estate complex in Havana, Cuba. It is located in the Miramar district of the municipality of Playa.

The Miramar Trade Center is owned and operated by the Cuban joint venture company Inmobiliaria Monte Barreto S.A. which in turn is owned jointly by Corporación CIMEX S.A. (a diversified commercial corporation owned by the Cuban government) and CEIBA Investments Ltd. (a Guernsey registered investment company).

The existing phases of the Miramar Trade Center (Phase I and Phase II) were constructed from 1999 to 2006 as part of the original Miramar Trade Center master plan, which projected an integrated development comprising 18 buildings having a total net rentable area of approximately 180,000 square meters.

== Complex ==
The buildings that have been constructed and occupied are named "Jerusalem", "Barcelona", "Habana", "Santiago", "Santa Clara" and "Beijing". The Jerusalem and Habana buildings were the first to open in January 2000 with 27,000 square meters of construction and covered parking for 200 cars. Work on Phase II, which contains four buildings interconnected between the 2nd and 4th floors in a square pattern, began in September 2000. Two of these buildings (Santiago and Barcelona) have four floors, with views of 5th Avenue (Quinta Avenida), while the other two buildings (Santa Clara and Beijing) have five floors with views of 3rd Avenue. From the second floor, the buildings can offer areas for rent of between 50 and 7,000 square meters per floor.

Canadian ZP International Inc. is the main designer of the complex, in conjunction with Empresa de Diseño de La Habana. Some 150 firms have their offices at the Miramar Trade Center, while other companies have expressed interest in opening their offices in that Havana sector when new space is available.
