= Jorge Luis Echarte =

Cuban politician, architect and civil engineer

Jorge Luis Echarte Mazorra
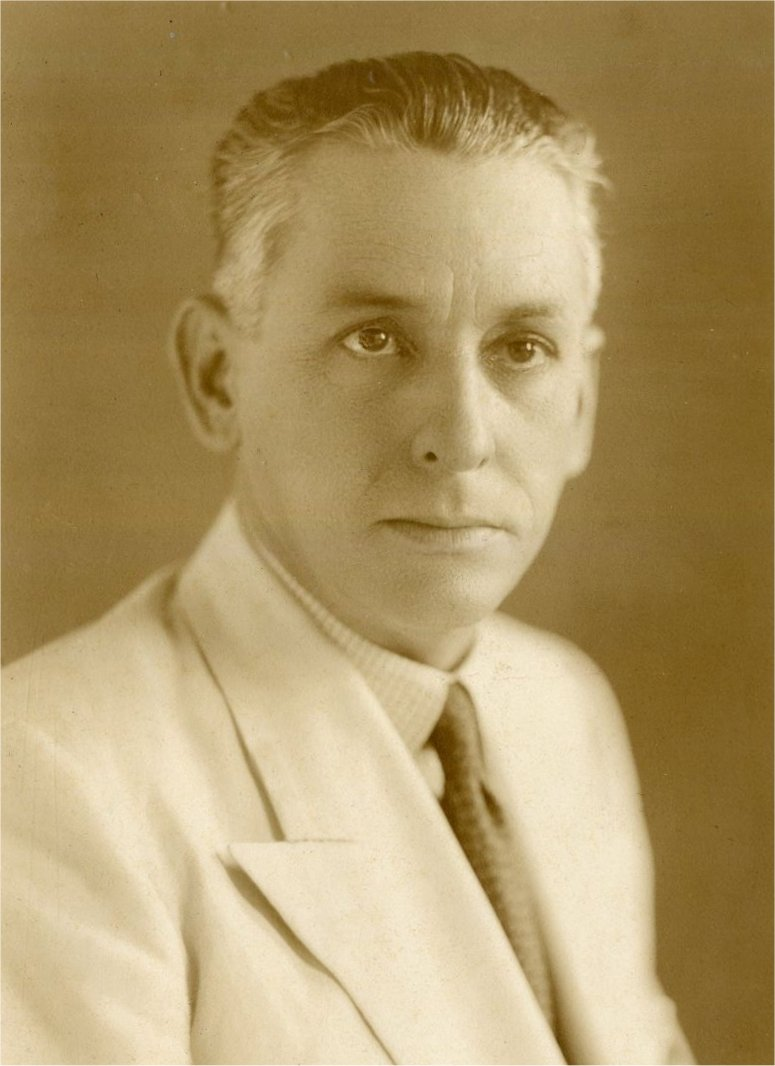

Ministry of Foreign Affairs
- In office 1935–1936
- President: José Agripino Barnet
- Preceded by: José Agripino Barnet
- Succeeded by: José Manuel Cortina

Personal details
- Born: Jorge Luis Echarte Mazorra; 17 February 1891 Havana, Cuba
- Died: July 1979 Fort Lauderdale, Broward County, Florida, U.S.
- Spouse: Carmen Romero Ochoterena
- Children: 3
- Education: University of Havana

Jorge Luis Echarte Mazorra (17 February 1891, in Havana, Cuba, July 1979, in Fort Lauderdale, Broward County, Florida, U.S.) was a prominent Cuban architect, civil engineer, and politician. He is best known for his pivotal role in the urban development of the Miramar neighborhood in Havana and for designing the Casa de las Tejas Verdes (House of the Green Tiles), one of the city’s most recognizable architectural landmarks. He also served briefly in government during the mid-1930s, holding senior posts related to foreign affairs and served as the Secretary of Public Works for the Republic of Cuba.

== Early life and education ==
Echarte was born in Havana on 17 February 1891, to Jorge Echarte and Felicia Mazorra. He attended the University of Havana, where he earned degrees in both Civil Engineering and Architecture. Graduating in 1915, he was among the first generation of architects trained entirely on the island; he ranked 14th in a graduating class of 26. His education coincided with a period of rapid urban expansion in Havana, allowing him to integrate modern engineering with the eclectic and neocolonial aesthetic preferences of the Cuban elite.

== Architectural career and urbanism ==
Echarte was an early member of the Colegio de Arquitectos de La Habana (National College of Architects of Cuba), founded in 1916. He co-founded the firm García & Echarte, Ingenieros, Arquitectos y Contratistas, which became a driving force in transforming the landscape of western Havana. The firm’s projects were instrumental in converting the once-rural outskirts into innovative residential developments. Beyond individual buildings, Echarte was a key figure in the layout of Miramar’s primary artery, Quinta Avenida (5th Avenue). He advocated for the garden city movement, characterized by wide, tree-lined boulevards and integrated green spaces. His urban planning helped shift Havana’s luxury residential focus from the Vedado district further west toward Miramar.

=== La Casa de las Tejas Verdes ===
Completed in 1926, the Casa de las Tejas Verdes was commissioned by Alberto de Armas. Located at the corner of Quinta Avenida and Calle 2 (2nd Street) in Miramar, the residence is celebrated for its unique blend of styles:

- Style: The house features a Gothic Tudor architecture, characterized by its steep, high-pitched roofs and dormers, which were unusual for the Caribbean architecture.
- The Tiles: The building earned its name from the distinctive green glazed ceramic tiles imported from U.S. that cover its roof.
- Legacy: For decades, the house stood as a symbol of the entrance to Miramar. After years of neglect, the house was restored in the early 21st century. It now serves as the Centro de Información Especializada en Arquitectura, Urbanismo y Diseño de Interiores (Center for Specialized Information in Architecture, Urbanism, and Interior Design) under the Oficina del Historiador de la Ciudad de La Habana (Office of the City Historian of Havana).

=== Edificio de la Compañía de Electricidad (Electric Company Building) ===
According to Cuban researchers María Victoria Zardoya Loureda and Ángel Manuel Álvarez Gómez the Electric Company Building (officially the General Pension and Social Assistance Fund for Electricity, Gas, and Water Workers) is Echarte’s masterpiece and represented the pinnacle of modern office design in mid-20th-century Cuba. The building incorporated cutting-edge technology and high-quality materials, including the extensive use of granite, marble, aluminum elements, and large glass panes, creating striking effects of transparency and brilliance. Its innovative design earned it a featured spot in the 1957 publication Álbum de Cuba, which highlighted the most significant constructions completed in the country that year. It also graced the cover of the Colegio de Arquitectos magazine, which dedicated its lead article to the building in the March 1958 issue.

== Political career ==
Echarte’s involvement in public life peaked during the mid-1930s, a period of significant political instability following the fall of Gerardo Machado.

- Secretary of Public Works: In September 1935, Echarte was appointed Secretary of Public Works under the provisional presidency of Carlos Mendieta. His appointment was seen as a move to bring technical expertise to the cabinet during a time of social and economic restructuring. Following Mendieta’s resignation, he continued in this role under President José Agripino Barnet through mid-1936. Echarte focused on restarting stalled infrastructure projects and modernizing urban regulations.
- Secretary of State (Foreign Minister): In May 1936, Barnet appointed Echarte as Foreign Minister. During his tenure, he navigated the economic pressures of the Great Depression and managed Cuba’s heavy foreign debt to U.S. investors, maintaining pragmatic diplomatic and trade ties with the United States. Echarte’s decisions emphasized diplomatic continuity and pragmatic realism, maintaining Cuba’s economic ties with the United States amid regional instability.

For his service to the nation, President Barnet awarded Echarte the Grand Cross of the National Order of Merit Carlos Manuel de Céspedes, Cuba’s highest diplomatic honor. Following his time in the mid-1930s cabinet, Echarte deliberately detached himself from the political sphere, holding no positions during the subsequent regimes of Fulgencio Batista.

== Personal life and death ==
Echarte was married to Carmen Romero Ochoterena, and the couple had three children: Jorge, Luis and María Teresa Echarte Romero. Following the Cuban Revolution in 1959, Echarte and his family emigrated to the United States. They settled in Miami, Florida, where he lived until his death in July 1979 at the age of 88.

== Bibliography ==
- Luis J. Echarte (2018). La Habana de mi abuelo. Mexico City.
- El Colegio Nacional de Arquitectos (March 1958). "Una obra del arquitecto Jorge Luis Echarte y Decoración interior por el arquitecto Jorge Luis Echarte" (pdf). Arquitectura. Revista Mensual publicada por el Colegio Nacional de Arquitectos (in Spanish). No. 296. Havana, Cuba. pp. 96–144.
- Juan Joaquín Otero; Arturo Alfonso Roselló (1954). Libro de Cuba: una enciclopedia ilustrada que abarca las artes, las letras, las ciencias, la economía, la política, la historia, la docencia, y el progreso general de la nación cubana - Edición Conmemorativa del Cincuentenario de la República de Cuba, 1902-1952 (in Spanish). Havana, Cuba: Publicaciones Unidas.
- Florencia Peñate Díaz; Ruslan Muñoz Hernández (2016). "Presencia de códigos neogóticos en la arquitectura cubana de la República (1901-1958)". In Martín M. Checa-Artasu; Olimpia Niglio (eds.). El Neogótico en la Arquitectura Americana. Historia, restauración, reinterpretaciones y reflexiones (pdf). Intercultural Dialogues (in Spanish). Ariccia, Italy: Ermes. Servizi editoriali integrati. pp. 261–280. ISBN 9788869751516.
