= Max Borges Jr. =

Cuban-born American architect (1918–2009)

Max E. Borges Jr.
- Born: Max Borges Recio; July 24, 1918; Havana, Cuba
- Died: January 18, 2009 (aged 90); Falls Church, Virginia, United States
- Citizenship: Cuba; United States
- Education: Georgia Tech, Harvard Graduate School of Design
- Occupation: Architect
- Spouse: Mignon Olmo-Garrido (married 1944)
- Children: 2
- Father: Max Borges del Junco

Max Borges Jr. (born Max Borges Recio; July 24, 1918 – January 18, 2009), was a Cuban-born architect, best known for his work in Havana in the 1940s and 1950s. He moved to the United States in later life.

== Biography ==
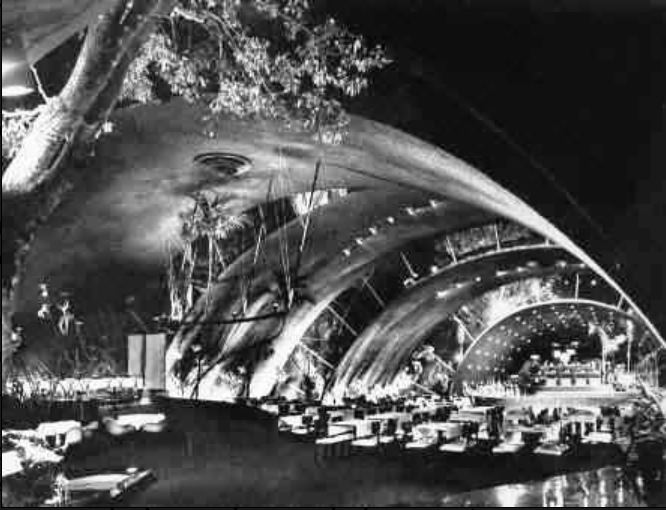
Tropicana Club. 1951

Borges Jr. was born in Cuba, the son of Max Borges del Junco, an architect. He later studied in the United States, earning his bachelor's degree at Georgia Tech and a master's degree at the Harvard Graduate School of Design. Borges Jr. returned to Cuba and joined his father's firm, together with his brother Enrique.

Borges' style was influenced by his work with Spanish structural engineer Félix Candela who practiced in Mexico and was a specialist in lightweight concrete parabolic structures. Borges invited Candela to work with him in Cuba, and they both developed extraordinary projects. Tropicana Club owner Martin Fox hired Borges to work on an expansion for the club. He produced the Arcos de Cristal (Crystal Arches). Previously Fox had commissioned Borges to design his Havana home, one of the first Cuban buildings to combine International Style Modernism with Colonial architecture.

Other buildings like the 1943 Apartment Building of Max Borges-del Junco at Jovellar St. and the Club Náutico place Borges among a few modern architects of the Americas with a recognizable, original style.

After 1959 his family moved to the United States, where he remained active well into the 1980s, along with his brother Enrique, designing and building many residential and commercial buildings in the Washington Metropolitan Area.

== Awards ==
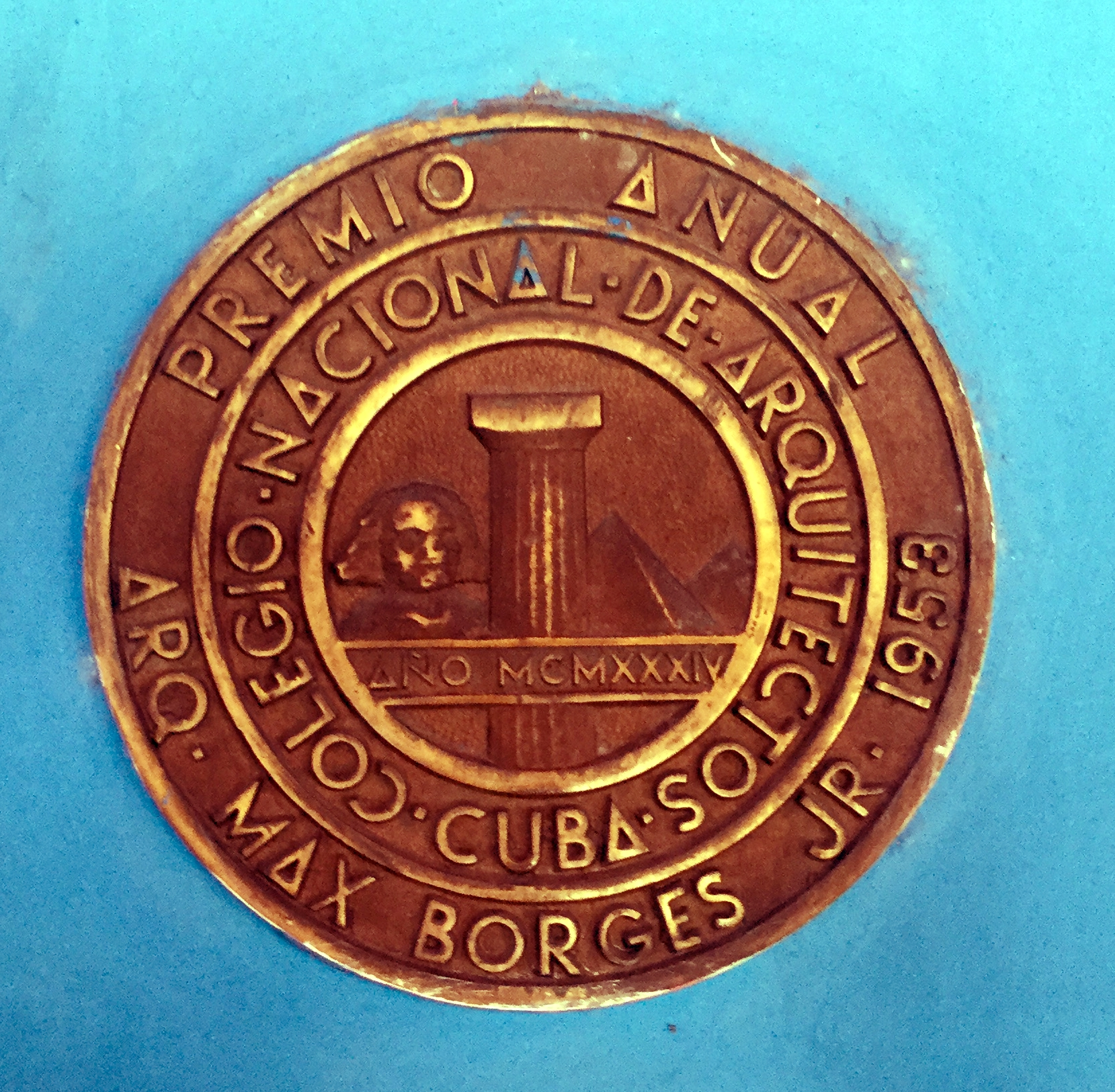
Colegio de Arquitectos Premio, 1953.

He twice won the Cuban National College of Architects Award. First, for his "Medical and Surgical Center" built in 1948 in El Vedado and, the second time, for the Tropicana Club in 1953. In 2006, he was awarded the Cintas Foundation Lifetime Achievement Award.

== Family ==
He was son of architect Max Borges del Junco, a well-known Cuban architect. His brother was architect Enrique Borges Recio, with whom he authored many works as partner. He married Mignon Olmo-Garrido (March 18, 1923–May 6, 2007) on February 5, 1944 at San Juan de Letrán Catholic Church in Havana, Cuba and they had two sons, Philip M. and Max M. Borges Olmo (also an architect).

== Notable projects ==
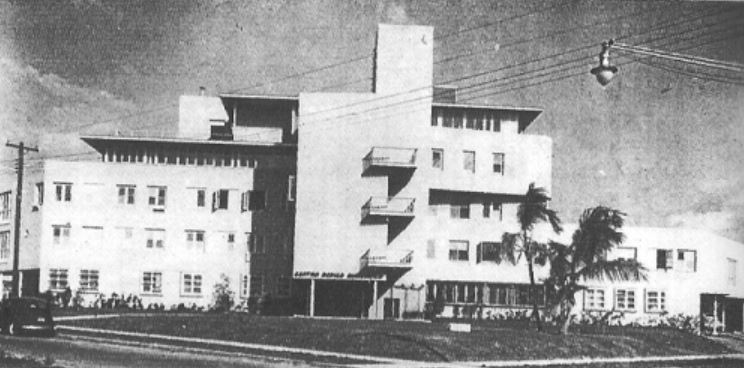
Centro Médico Quirúrgico. 1948

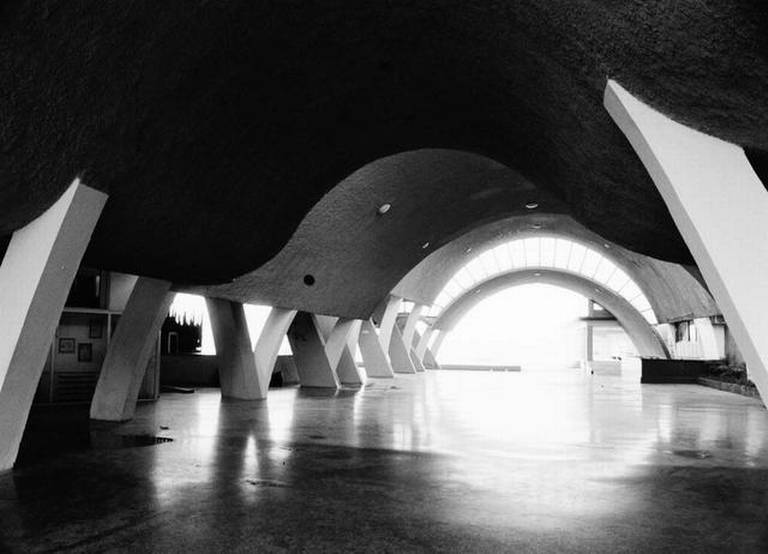
Club Náutico. 1953

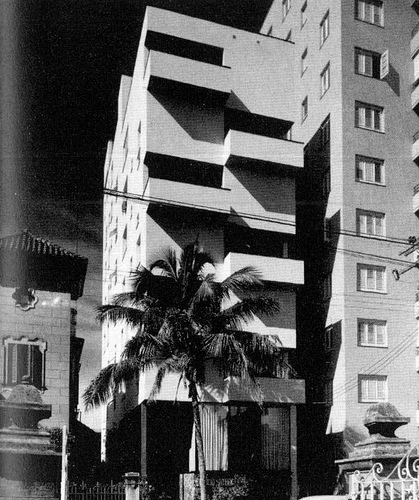
Edificio Anter, La Habana, 1954

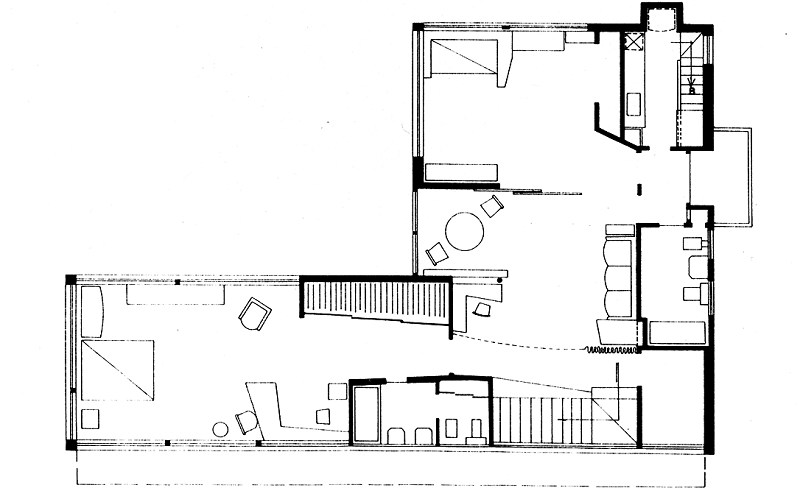
Max Borges Jr. House_1958

- House of Santiago Claret (1941)
- House of Martin Fox (1941)
- Apartment Building of Max Borges del Junco (1943)
- House of Paula Maza (1946)
- House of Max Borges Recio (1948)
- Medical and Surgical Center (Centro Medico Quirurgico) (1948)
- Tropicana Club (1951), Havana, Cuba
- Club Náutico (1953), Havana, Cuba
- Partagas Building (1954)
- Anter Building (1954)
- Nunez Bank (1957)
- House of Alberto Borges (1957)
- House of Humberto Tous (1957)

== See also ==
- Mario Girona
