= Santa Lucía (Minas de Matahambre) =

- Village
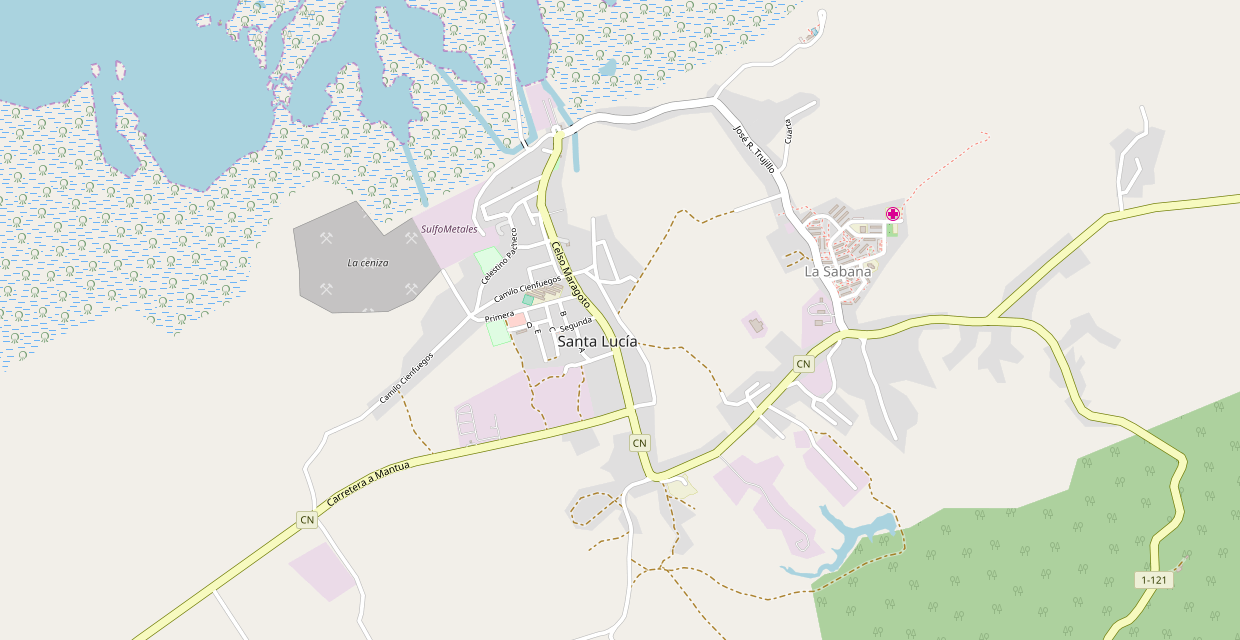
- OSM map showing Santa Lucía and the neighboring village of La Sabana

- Location of Santa Lucía in Cuba
- Coordinates: 22°39′37.5″N 83°57′49.5″W
- Country: Cuba
- Province: Pinar del Río
- Municipality: Minas de Matahambre
- Founded: 1912
- Elevation: 10 m (33 ft)

Population (2011)
  - Total: 4,240
- Time zone: UTC-5 (EST)
- Area code: +53-82

Santa Lucía is a Cuban village and consejo popular ("people's council", i.e. hamlet) of the municipality of Minas de Matahambre, in Pinar del Río Province. In 2011 it had a population of 4,240.

== History ==
The village was founded and developed from the discovery of a copper field in Minas de Matahambre, in 1912. It was built a road from the deposit to the sea and, one year later, a pier in the new harbor of Santa Lucía. During the 1980s, because of the mining development, the population grew and the satellite village of La Sabana was built east of it.

== Geography ==
Santa Lucía lies between a marsh, by the Atlantic Coast, and the Sierra de los Órganos mountain range (part of Guaniguanico). It spans on a plain strip, along with the neighboring and satellite village of La Sabana, with whom it forms a small urban area of about 10,000 inhabitants.

The village is 11 km from Cayo Jutías, 13 from Minas de Matahambre, 43 from Viñales and its valley, 60 from Pinar del Río and 64 from Mantua.

== Transport ==
Santa Lucía counts a little harbor, built in 1912 for of mining transport, with a marina. It is crossed, to the south, by the "Circuito Norte" (CN), a state highway connecting the nearby Mantua to Baracoa, in Guantánamo Province, through the northern coastal area of the whole country. A secondary highway, the 1-121, connects the village to Minas de Matahambre and Pinar del Río, the provincial capital.

== Sport ==
The village has a baseball venue, the "Estadio Camilo Cienfuegos", located northwest of settlement's centre.

== See also ==
- Municipalities of Cuba
- List of cities in Cuba
