= Sierra de los Órganos =

Mountain range in Pinar del Río, Cuba

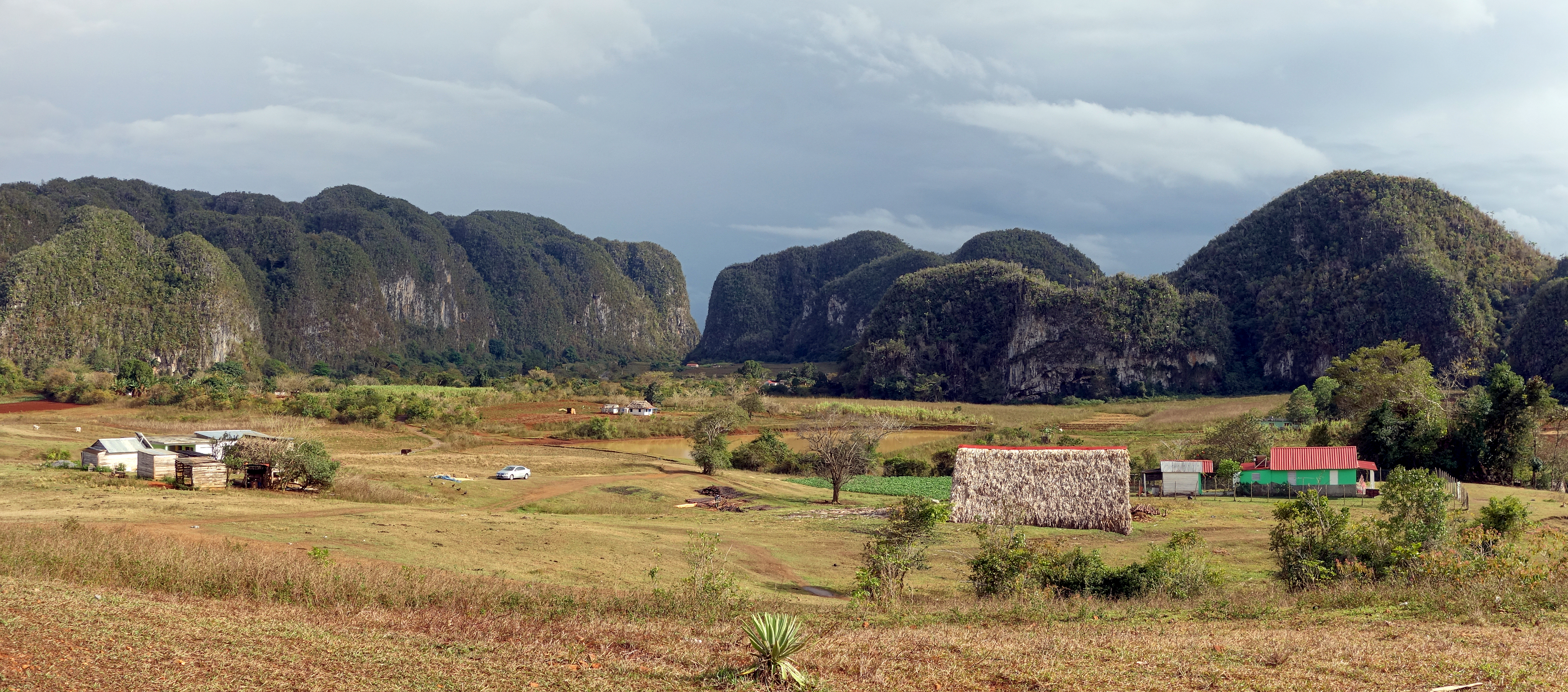
- View of the mogotes of Viñales Valley

Highest point
- Coordinates: 22°37′0″N 83°43′0″W

Geography
- Location within Cuba
- Country: Cuba
- Province: Pinar del Río
- Range coordinates: 22°37′0″N 83°43′0″W

Sierra de los Órganos (pronounced [ˈsjera ðe los ˈoɾɣanos]) is a mountain range in the province of Pinar del Río, western Cuba. Along with the Sierra del Rosario, it is part of the Guaniguanico mountain range.

== Geography ==
The Sierra is the western part of Guaniguanico and spans from Guane to the San Diego River, in the municipality of Los Palacios. The other municipalities including the range are Mantua, San Juan y Martínez, Minas de Matahambre, Viñales, Pinar del Río, Consolación del Sur and La Palma.

== Landmarks ==
In the middle of the Sierra de los Órganos is located the Viñales Valley, a natural reserve and World Heritage Site. In the east it is the protected area of Mil Cumbres, located almost entirely in the Sierra del Rosario.

== See also ==
- Pan de Guajaibón
- Eleutherodactylus zeus
