= Polo Montañez =

- Also known as: Guajiro Natural
- Born: Fernando Borrego Linares; 5 June 1955; Candelaria, Cuba
- Died: 26 November 2002 (aged 47) Havana, Cuba
- Genre: Son cubano
- Occupation: Singer-songwriter
- Instrument: Guitar
- Years active: 1972–2002
- Label: Lusafrica

Polo Montañez (5 June 1955 – 26 November 2002) was a Cuban singer and songwriter.

== Early life ==
Montañez was born Fernando Borrego Linares on a Sierra del Rosario farm, known as El Brujito within the Candelaria municipality. At an early age, Montañez undertook jobs, including operating a tractor, milking cows, producing charcoal and working as a lumberjack. During his leisure time, he went from house to house performing songs, and eventually played at local parties, as well as family gatherings. By the age of seven, he learned to play the tumbadora and the guitar.

== Career ==
Montañez started to manage a group that played in touristic areas of La Cordillera de los Órganos. He lived in Cañada del Infierno, Casa Blanca, and Finca del Cusco, a house in the touristic community of Las Terrazas. In 1973, he wrote his first song, titled "Este Tiempo Feliz" (This Happy Moment). In 1994, Polo and his ensemble began performing in various tourist destinations in Las Terrazas, including Hotel Moka, Rancho Curujey, and Cafetal Buenavista. In 1999, he signed a contract with the French record label Lusafrica. The following year, he released his debut studio album, Guajiro Natural, along with its lead single, "Un Montón De Estrellas." Its blend of genres, distinctive style, and universal themes of love and personal experience woven with rural imagery made him immensely popular, both in his native Cuba and internationally, especially throughout Latin America. In Colombia, the album sold over 40,000 copies, earning both Gold and Platinum certification. His rising fame earned him the nickname El Guajiro Natural ("The Natural Countryman"). In 2002, he played a concert in Holguín that drew a far larger crowd than the event planners had anticipated.

== Touring History ==
He performed in Colombia five times, France on two occasions, Portugal, Belgium, the Netherlands, Italy, Mexico, Ecuador, and Costa Rica.

He shared the stage with many artists, including Rubén Blades, Andy Montañez, Margarita Francisco, Cesária Évora, Cándido Fabré, Francisco Repilado (Compay Segundo), Eliades Ochoa, Adalberto Álvarez, Danny Rivera, Gilberto Santa Rosa and others.

== Death ==
On 20 November 2002, Polo Montañez was involved in a car accident in the Coronela Zone near San Cristóbal, Pinar del Río, while returning from a family gathering with several relatives. His vehicle collided with a tractor-trailer, resulting in the death of his 25-year-old stepson, Mirel González García, and injuries to his wife, Adis García. Montañez was taken to the Carlos J. Finlay Military Hospital in Havana, where he remained in critical condition for six days. He died on the night of 26 November 2002, at the age of 47, as a result of injuries sustained in the crash. He was buried in the cemetery of Candelaria, Artemisa. The cultural centre in the main square of Viñales, Pinar del Rio, is named in his honour.

Soon after his death, the songwriter José Valladares composed a song in honour of Polo entitled "Cazador de Estrellas" (Star Hunter), which was interpreted by various artists such as Pedro Calvo, Paulito FG, and Jenny (Los Van Van's vocalist).

== Discography ==
- Guajiro Natural (2000) - CD Lusafrica 362202
- Guitarra Mía (2002) - CD Lusafrica 362502
- Memoria (2004) - CD Lusafrica 462222
- El Guajiro (2005) - DVD Lusafrica 462438, 2005
- Cuestión de Suerte (2006)
