= Sierra del Rosario =

Mountain range of Cuba

Sierra del Rosario Biosphere Reserve
- IUCN category IV (habitat/species management area)
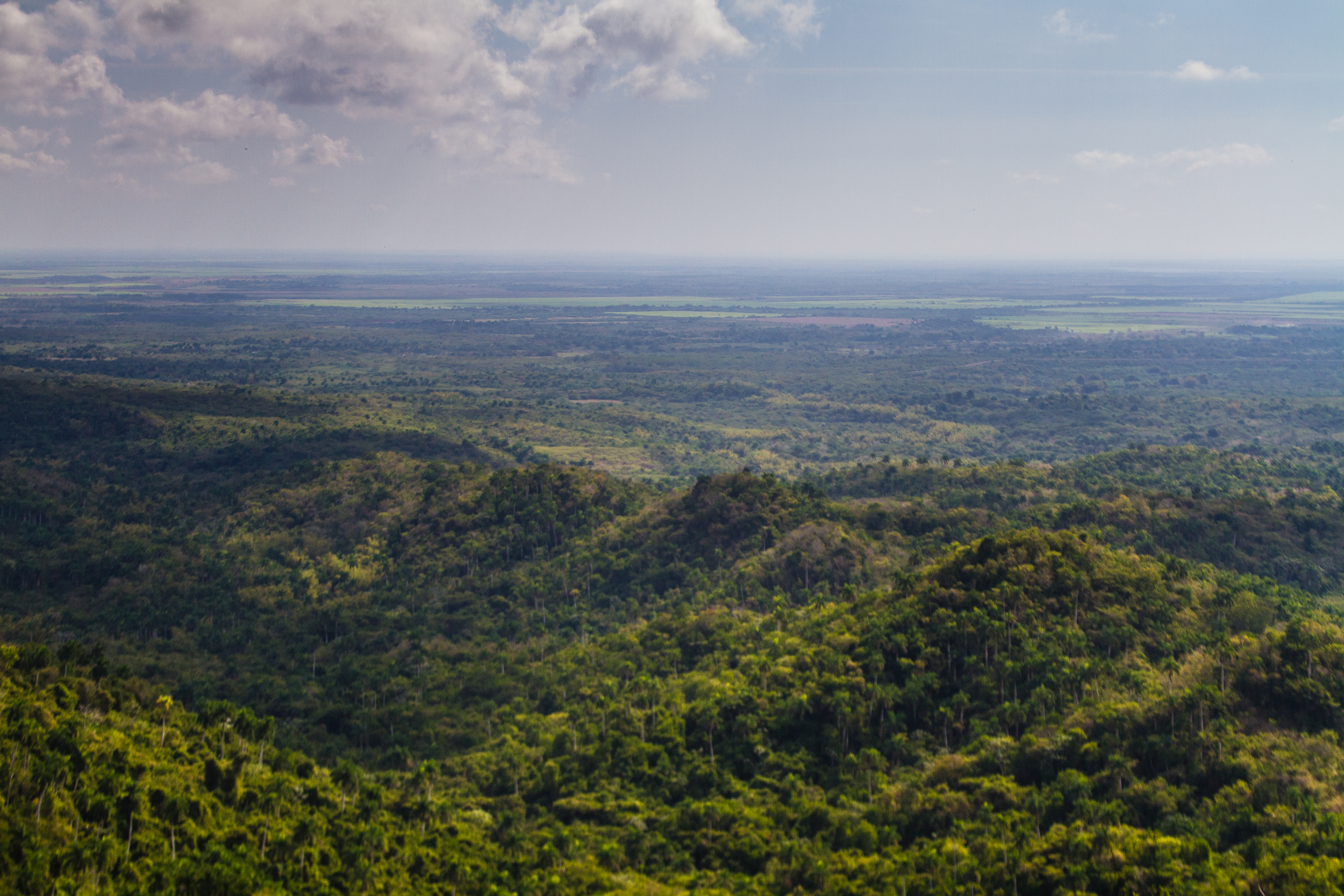
- The Mirador de Soroa

- Location within Cuba
- Location: Cuba
- Nearest city: La Palma
- Coordinates: 22°42′36″N 83°33′59″W
- Area: 266.86 km^{2} (103.04 sq mi)
- Established: February 15, 1984

Sierra del Rosario is a mountain range in the provinces of Pinar del Río and Artemisa, western Cuba. It is located in the eastern part of the Guaniguanico range and, along with the Sierra de los Órganos, is part of it.

== Geography ==
The range lies in the north-western part of the province of Pinar del Río and in the eastern part of Artemisa, between the municipalities of La Palma, Los Palacios, Consolación del Sur, Bahía Honda, Candelaria and San Cristóbal.

It was established as a Biosphere Reserve and an IUCN Managed Resource Protected Area on February 15, 1984, being the first one in Cuba to be classified as such. It protects a total area of 266.86 km^{2} (103.04 sq mi), of tropical forests with evergreen and semi-deciduous environments.

== Conservation ==
Over 800 species of plants are hosted in the mesic forest that covers the mountains, with 35% being endemic. Fauna includes five species of bats; numerous birds (notably the Bee hummingbird); various frogs, including the yellow-striped pygmy eleuth (Eleutherodactylus limbatus) and the Zeus' robber frog (Eleutherodactylus zeus); and various lizards such as the Anolis luteogulartis.

== See also ==
- Soroa
- Las Terrazas
