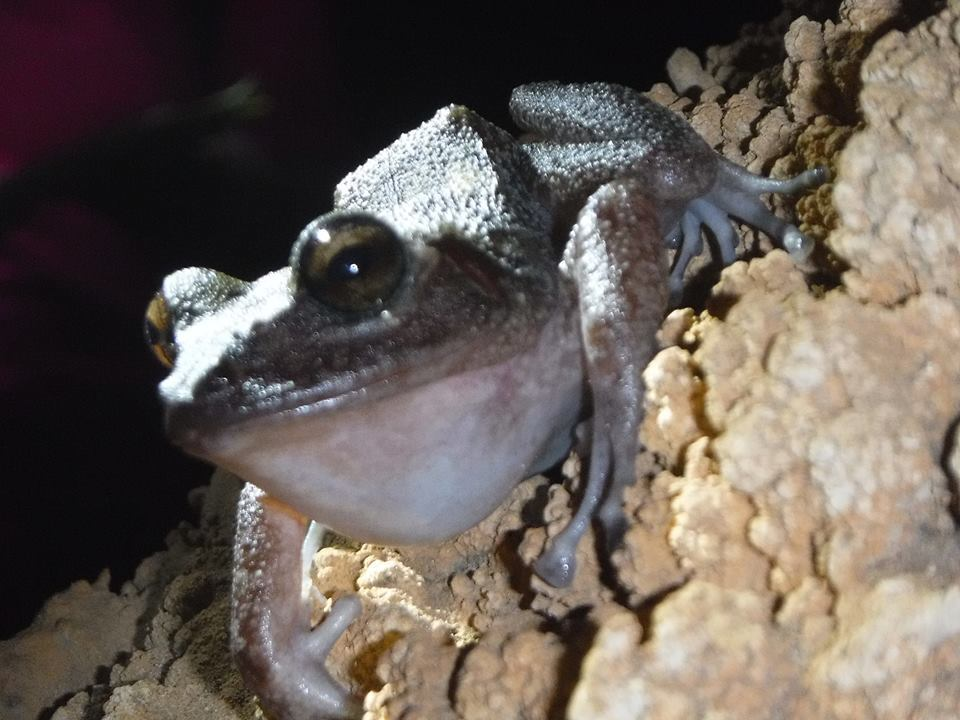

Conservation status
- Endangered (IUCN 3.1)

Scientific classification
- Kingdom: Animalia
- Phylum: Chordata
- Class: Amphibia
- Order: Anura
- Family: Eleutherodactylidae
- Genus: Eleutherodactylus
- Subgenus: Syrrhophus
- Species: E. zeus

Binomial name
- Eleutherodactylus zeus Schwartz, 1958

= Eleutherodactylus zeus =

Species of amphibian

Eleutherodactylus zeus (common name: Zeus' robber frog) is a species of frog in the family Eleutherodactylidae. It is endemic to western Cuba and known from the Sierra de los Órganos and the Sierra del Rosario, in the Pinar del Río and Artemisa provinces. Its natural habitats are rock crevices and caves in mesic broadleaf forest in limestone areas. It is threatened by habitat loss and disturbance associated with tourism.
