= Guaniguanico =

Mountain range of Cuba

- Cordillera de Guaniguanico
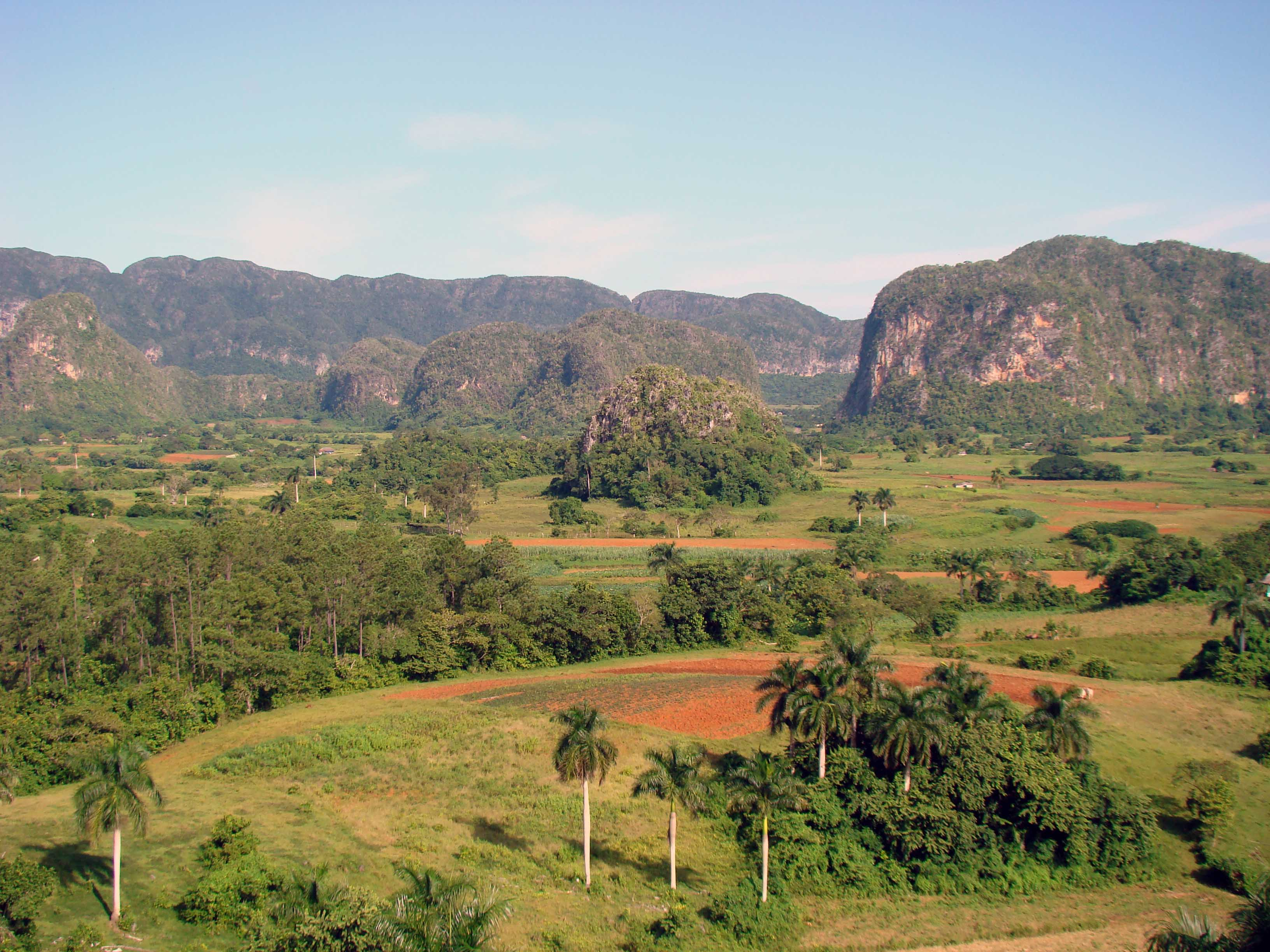
- Viñales Valley, part of the cordillera

Highest point
- Peak: Pan de Guajaibón
- Elevation: 699 m (2,293 ft)
- Coordinates: 22°47′26.66″N 83°21′53.03″W

Dimensions
- Length: 160 km (99 mi)

Geography
- Location within Cuba
- Country: Cuba
- Provinces: Pinar del Río and Artemisa
- Range coordinates: 22°43′19″N 83°28′48″W

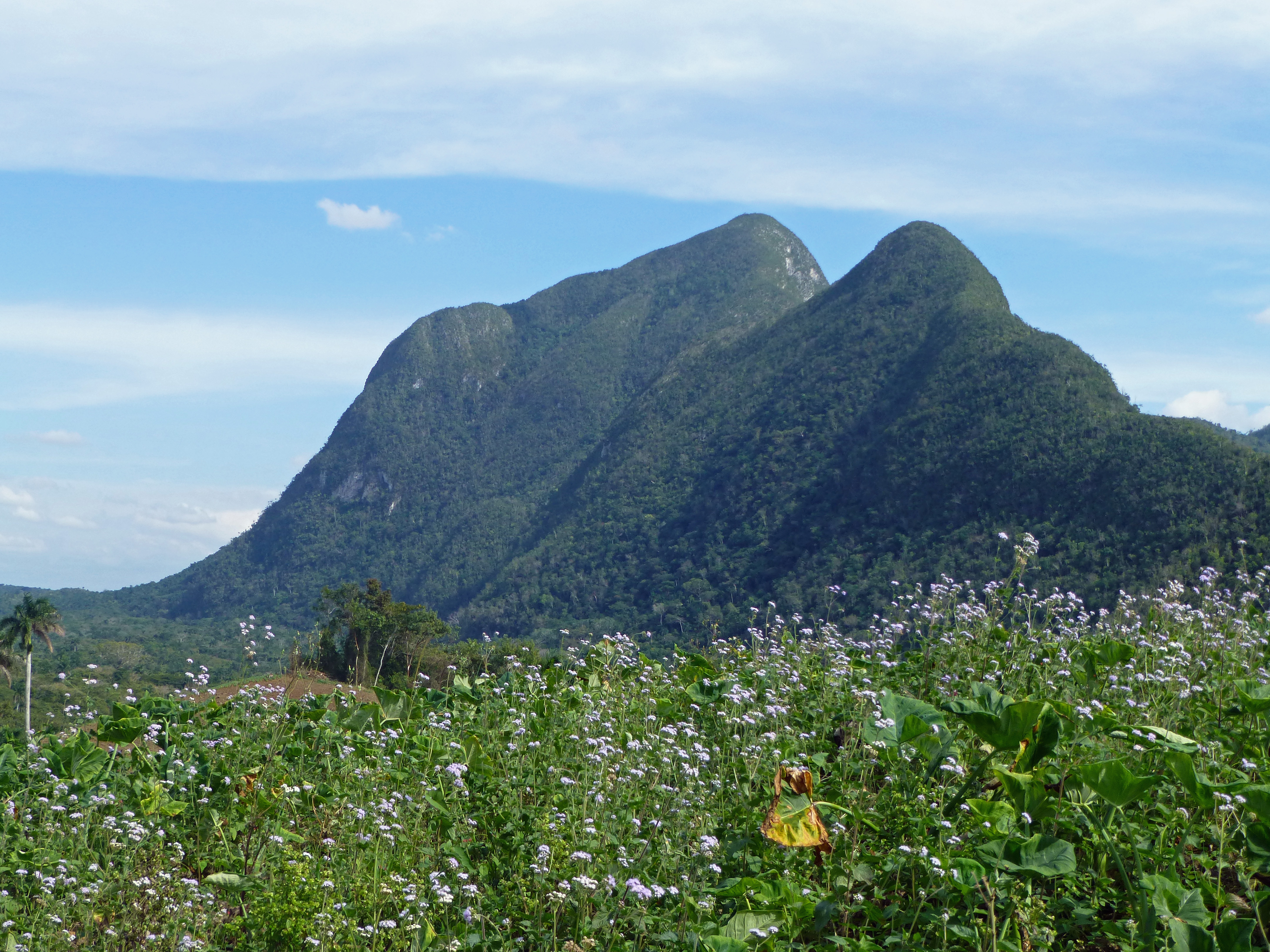
Pan de Guajaibón mountain

Guaniguanico, also known as Cordillera de Guaniguanico, is a mountain range of western Cuba that extends from the centre-west of Pinar del Río Province to the western area of Artemisa Province. It is formed by the subranges of Sierra del Rosario and Sierra de los Órganos.

== Etymology ==
Julian Granberry and Gary Vescelius (2004) suggest a Guanahatabey etymology for the name Guaniguanico, comparing it with wani-wani-ku 'hidden moon, moon-set' in the purportedly related Warao language of the Orinoco Delta.

== Geography ==
The cordillera extends for a length of circa 160 km, from the town Guane, in the west of Pinar del Río Province, to the Alturas de Mariel, near Mariel, Artemisa Province. The two subranges composing it, Sierra de los Órganos (west) and Sierra del Rosario (east), are divided in the middle by the San Diego River (Río San Diego). The highest peak is the Pan de Guajaibón (699 m), located between the municipalities of Bahía Honda and La Palma. It represents a symbol of western Cuba.

== Landmarks ==
The Guaniguanico includes the Viñales Valley, a natural reserve and World Heritage Site; and other landmarks as the waterfalls of Salto de Soroa, the nature reserve of Las Terrazas, and the protected area of Mil Cumbres.

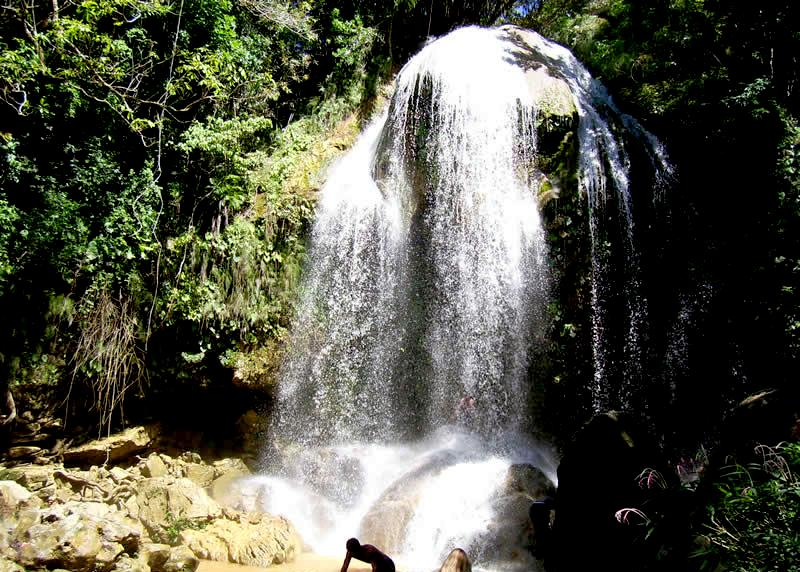
Salto de Soroa waterfall

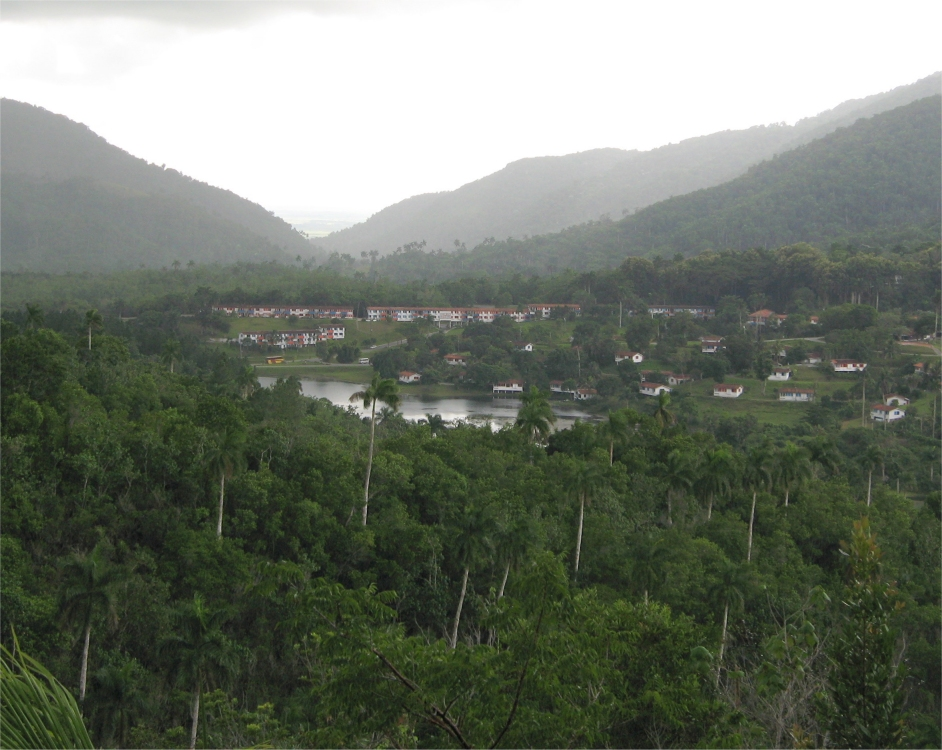
Las Terrazas natural reserve

== See also ==
- Geography of Cuba
