= La Palma Municipal Museum =

Museum in La Palma, Cuba

- Museo Municipal de La Palma
- Established: 31 May 1982
- Location: La Palma, Cuba

La Palma Municipal Museum is a museum located in the Martí street in La Palma, Cuba. The building was constructed in 1892 and was owned by José López Queipo. It was established as a museum on 31 May 1982.

The museum holds 11 sections (history, archaeology, weapons, numismatics, arts, documents among others) and 21 collections.

It has been closed since 1997 but research and preservation tasks are still on-going.

== See also ==
- List of museums in Cuba
