= Minas de Matahambre Municipal Museum =

Museum in Cuba

- Museo Municipal de Minas de Matahambre
- Established: 30 July 1980
- Location: Minas de Matahambre, Cuba

Minas de Matahambre Municipal Museum is a museum located in Minas de Matahambre, Cuba. It was established as a museum on 30 July 1980.

The museum holds about 1,000 objects, mostly related to the economic and social development of the area. There is an important collection of old photographs about the first decades of the village.

== See also ==
- List of museums in Cuba
