= San Cristóbal Municipal Museum =

Museum in Cuba

- Museo Municipal de San Cristóbal
- Established: 31 May 1983
- Location: San Cristóbal, Cuba

San Cristóbal Municipal Museum is a museum located in the Maceo street in San Cristóbal, Cuba. It was established on 31 May 1983.

The museum holds collections on history, decorative arts and numismatics.

== See also ==
- List of museums in Cuba
