= Pinar del Río Province =

Province of Cuba

- Province
- Coat of arms

- Country: Cuba
- Settled: November 10, 1867
- Capital: Pinar del Río

Government
  - Governor: Eumelín González Sánchez ( PCC)
  - Vice-Governor: Niurka Rodríguez

Area
  - Total: 8,884.51 km^{2} (3,430.33 sq mi)

Population (2022)
  - Total: 575,545
  - Density: 64.7807/km^{2} (167.781/sq mi)
- Demonym: Pinareños-Pinareñas
- Time zone: UTC−5 (EST)
- Area code: +53-48
- HDI (2019): 0.775 high · 10th of 16
- Website: https://redpinar.gob.cu/es/

The Pinar del Río Province is one of the 15 provinces of Cuba. It is at the western end of the island of Cuba. The capital and largest city is Pinar del Río (191,081 pop. in 2022).

== Geography ==
The Pinar del Río province is Cuba's westernmost province and contains one of Cuba's three main mountain ranges, the Cordillera de Guaniguanico, divided into the easterly Sierra del Rosario and the westerly Sierra de los Órganos. These form a landscape characterised by steep sided limestone hills (called mogotes) and flat, fertile valleys. One such topographic feature, the Viñales Valley, is a UNESCO World Heritage Site.

The northern coast opens to the great Gulf of Mexico, and is lined by the Colorados Archipelago, a string of cays and isles developed on a reef barrier. The westernmost point of Cuba, Cabo San Antonio, is located on the Guanahacabibes Peninsula, which is a National Park and a Biosphere Reserve.

== History ==
The city was founded by the Spanish as Nueva Filipinas (New Philippines) in response to an influx of Asian laborers coming from the Philippine Islands to work on tobacco plantations and the city was renamed Pinar del Río in 1774. The province was founded in 1879.

In 1851 the filibustering Lopez Expedition landed in the province in an effort to seize control of the island, but were defeated by the Spanish Army and their leaders executed.

== Economy ==
Ever since tobacco was discovered by European colonists, the region has relied heavily on tobacco farming, with Pinar del Río producing 70% of Cuba's crop, used to make the famed Cuban cigars. Tobacco is grown and harvested in the province, and shipped to Havana where they are rolled into cigars and exported. The best tobacco, used for more expensive cigar brands, is grown in the flat lands of San Juan y Martínez.

=== Tourism ===
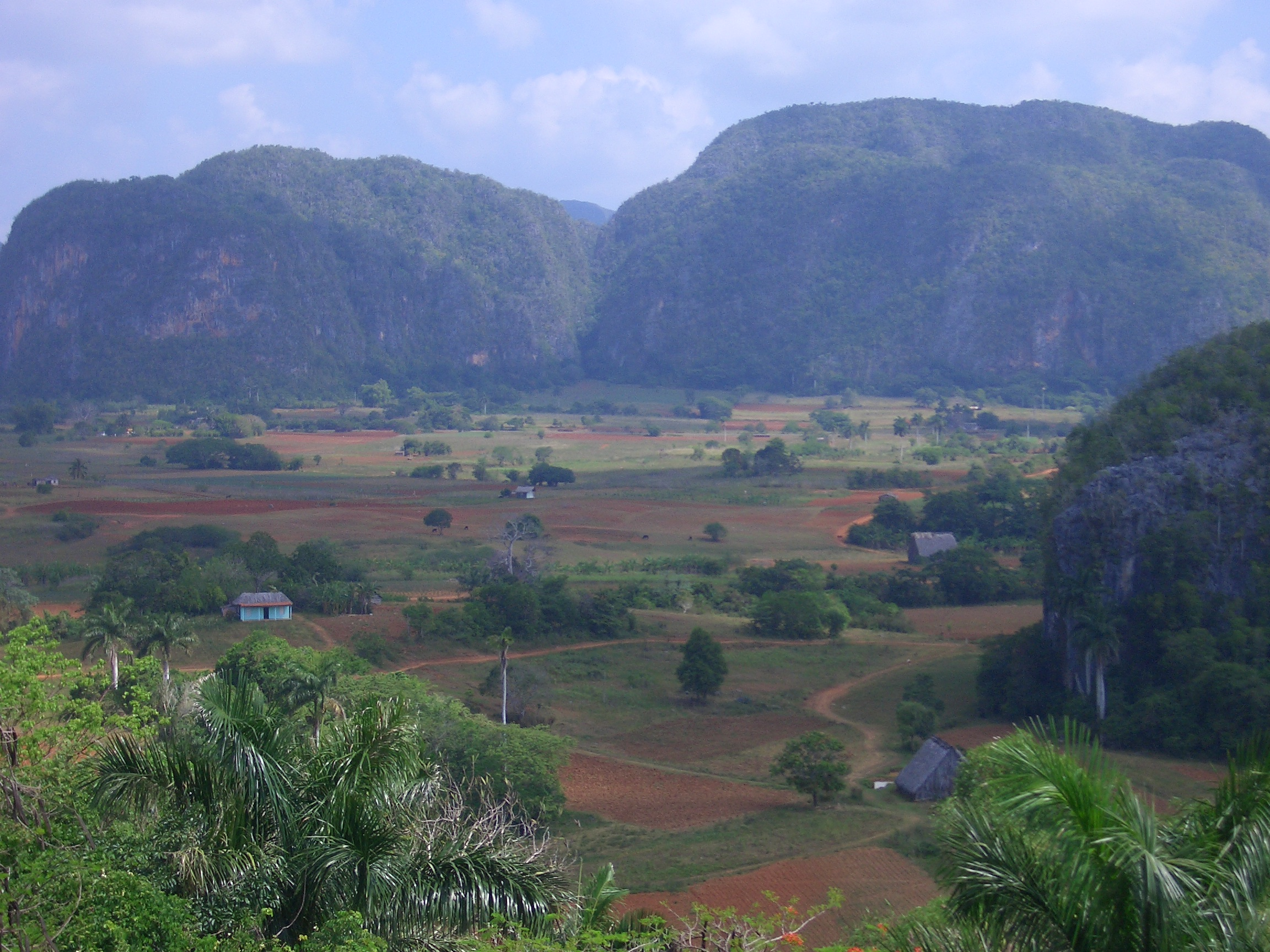
Viñales Valley

Tourism is also an important part of the province's economy. Though the town of Pinar del Río (the provincial capital) has some places of cultural and historical interest (such as the Cathedral of San Rosendo, a 19th-century construction), most attractions are to be found in rural or natural settings. A major destination is the Viñales Valley, a karstic depression located in the Sierra de los Organos, north of the town of Viñales. Designated a World Heritage Site by UNESCO in 1999 because of its natural beauty and the traditional agricultural techniques which continue to be used in the cultivation of tobacco and other crops there, the valley is a popular hiking and rock climbing location.

Many of the valley's surrounding hills are dotted with caves which may be explored by visitors and spelunking has become another popular activity in the province (a particularly interesting cave is the Cueva de los Portales, beside the Río Caiguanabo, where Che Guevara set up his staff headquarters and dormitory as commander of the Western Army during the Cuban Missile Crisis).

Accommodations in and near Viñales have also grown in number in response to growing tourism in the region. In addition to casas particulares (licensed bed and breakfasts in private residences), there are a number of hotels some kilometers from the town.

Another major tourist destination in the province was Las Terrazas, a unique model village located 20 kilometer northeast of Soroa and, from 2011, part of the new Artemisa Province. Surrounded by mountains, the village was founded in 1971 as part of rural development and reforestation project which spans 5,000 ha (12,355 acres). As in other parts of the province, there are several hiking trails which weave through the surrounding mountains. Some companies offer guided hiking tours on a daily basis (in some areas, in fact, a guide is mandatory).

With around 30 diving sites, Pinar del Río is also considered one of Cuba's premier scuba diving destinations. Cayo Levisa, about two kilometers offshore, is known for its copious black coral and excursions to this cay are afforded by tour agencies based in the province. Another hugely popular location is María la Gorda beach, which boasts many nearby dive sites (as close as 200 m (220 yd) from the beach).

An increasing number of tourists also visit the San Diego hot springs, in search of the health benefits reportedly afforded by the warm sulfur-rich waters there. An additional spectrum of health-related services has also become available at this spa, including massages and mud baths.

== Municipalities ==
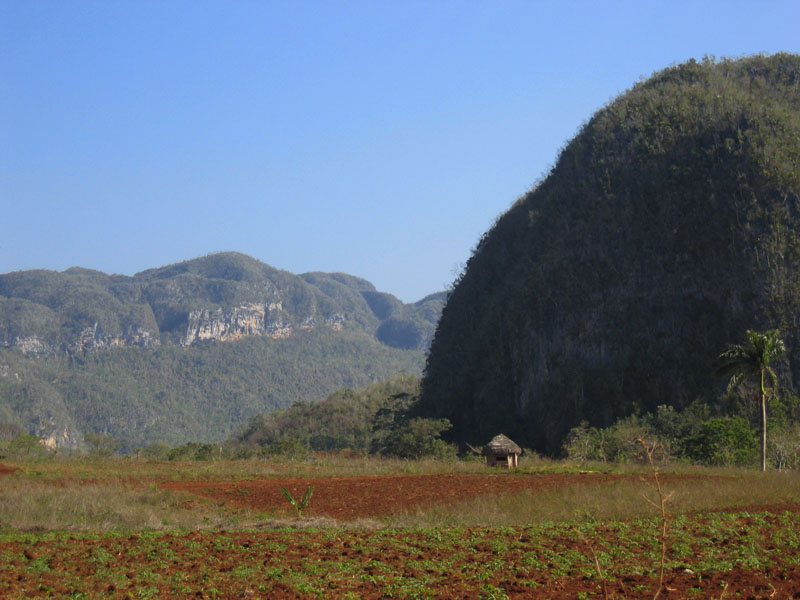
Dome-like rounded mogotes in Viñales Valley

Municipality	Population (2022)	Area (km²)	Location	Remarks
Consolación del Sur	86,959	1,112	22°30′0″N 83°30′55″W	
Guane	34,922	717	22°12′2″N 84°05′1″W	
La Palma	33,352	621	22°45′22″N 83°33′12″W	
Los Palacios	37,524	786	22°34′57″N 83°14′56″W	
Mantua	23,233	915	22°17′27″N 84°17′14″W	
Minas de Matahambre	30,946	858	22°34′57″N 83°56′57″W	
Pinar del Río	191,081	708	22°25′33″N 83°41′18″W	Provincial capital
San Juan y Martínez	42,109	409	22°16′0″N 83°50′2″W	
San Luis	31,242	765	22°16′59″N 83°46′4″W	
Sandino	35,437	1,718	22°04′52″N 84°13′18″W	
Viñales	28,740	704	22°36′55″N 83°42′57″W	

Source: Population from 2022 estimates. Area from 1976 municipal re-distribution.

Until 2011 the municipalities of Bahía Honda, Candelaria and San Cristóbal were part of the province. After the split of La Habana Province into the new provinces of Artemisa and Mayabeque, the three municipios joined Artemisa.

== Notable people ==
- Omar Ajete – baseball player
- Randy Arozarena – baseball player
- Eulogio Cantillo - Cuban Army General
- Luis Giraldo Casanova – baseball player
- Juan Castro – baseball player
- Willy Chirino – singer/songwriter
- José Contreras – baseball player
- Marlenis Costa – volleyball player
- Silvia Costa – high jumper
- Emeterio González – javelin thrower
- Ariel Hernández – boxer
- Enrique Jorrín- singer/songwriter
- Pedro Luis Lazo – baseball player
- Juan Carlos Lemus – boxer
- Omar Linares – baseball player
- Mijaín López – wrestler
- Polo Montañez – singer/songwriter
- Pedro Pablo Oliva – painter
- Tony Oliva - baseball player
- Pedro Pablo Pérez – cyclist
- Rudy Pérez – composer
- Ioamnet Quintero – high jumper
- Alexei Ramírez – baseball player
- Alejandro Robaina – famed tobacco grower
- Pablo Romero – boxer

== Demographics ==
In 2010, the province of Pinar del Río had a population of 592,042. With a total area of 8,884 km^{2} (3,430 sq mi), the province had a population density of 67.0/km^{2} (174/sq mi).
