= Candelaria Municipal Museum =

Museum in Cuba

- Museo Municipal de Candelaria
- Established: 31 May 1982
- Location: Candelaria, Cuba

Candelaria Municipal Museum is a museum located in the 31st avenue in Candelaria, Cuba. It was established as a museum on 31 May 1982.

The museum holds collections on history, archeology, weaponry and numismatics.

== See also ==
- List of museums in Cuba
