= Pan de Guajaibón =

Mountain in Cuba

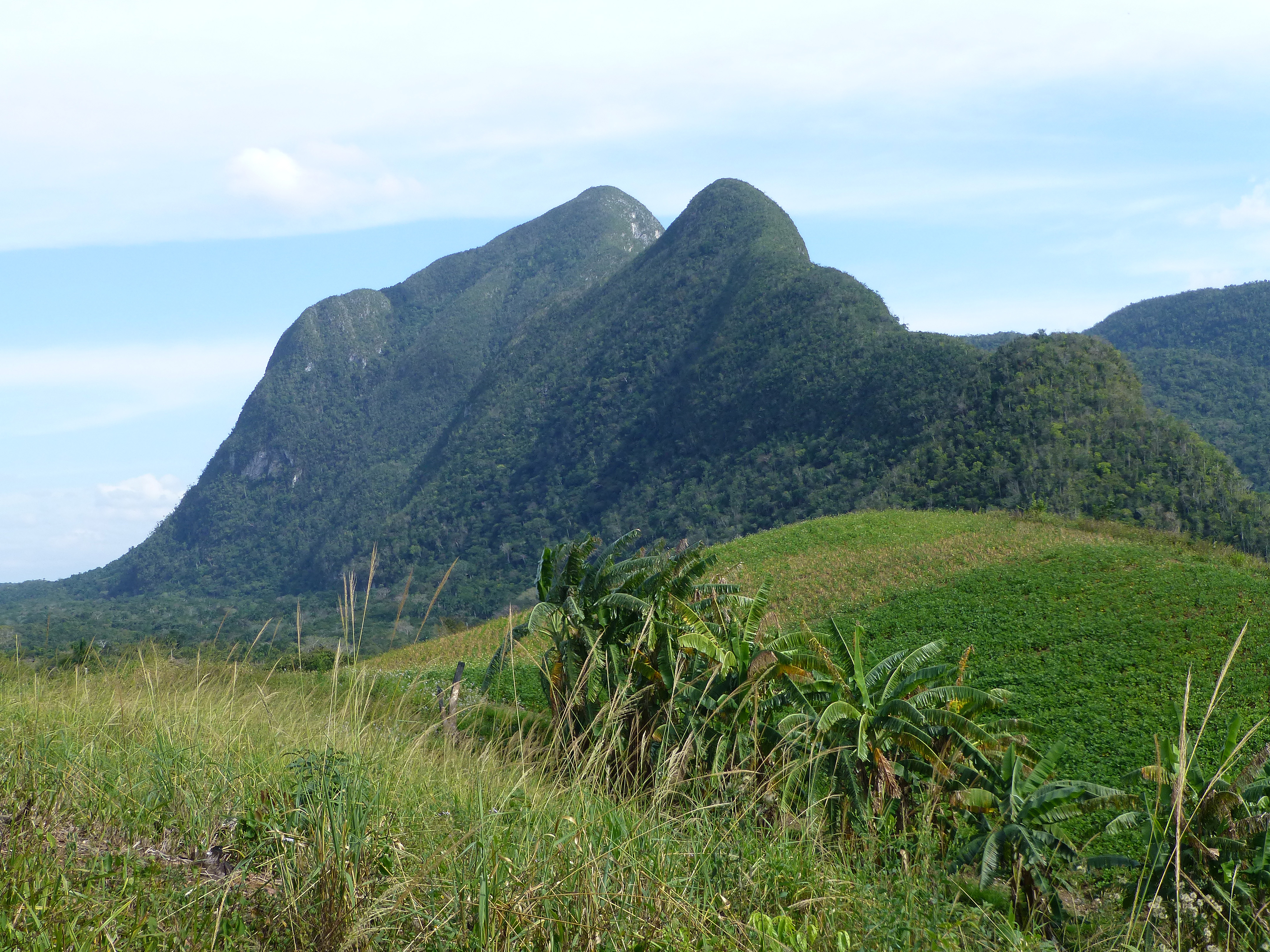

Highest point
- Prominence: 699 m (2,293 ft)
- Coordinates: 22°47′14″N 83°22′06″W

Geography
- Location within Cuba
- Location: Guaniguanico range, western Cuba
- Parent range: Guaniguanico

Pan de Guajaibón is a mountain in the Guaniguanico range of western Cuba. It has two peaks, the highest of which is 699 metres above sea level. It is the highest mountain in the Guaniguanico range.

Although most of the Sierra del Rosario stands in Artemisa Province, its mostwestern part is in Pinar del Río Province - including the Pan de Guajaibón.

A bust of Antonio Maceo Grajales is situated at the top of the mountain.

There are also cave systems at the mountain which contain archeological artifacts.
