= Las Terrazas =

- Village and nature reserve
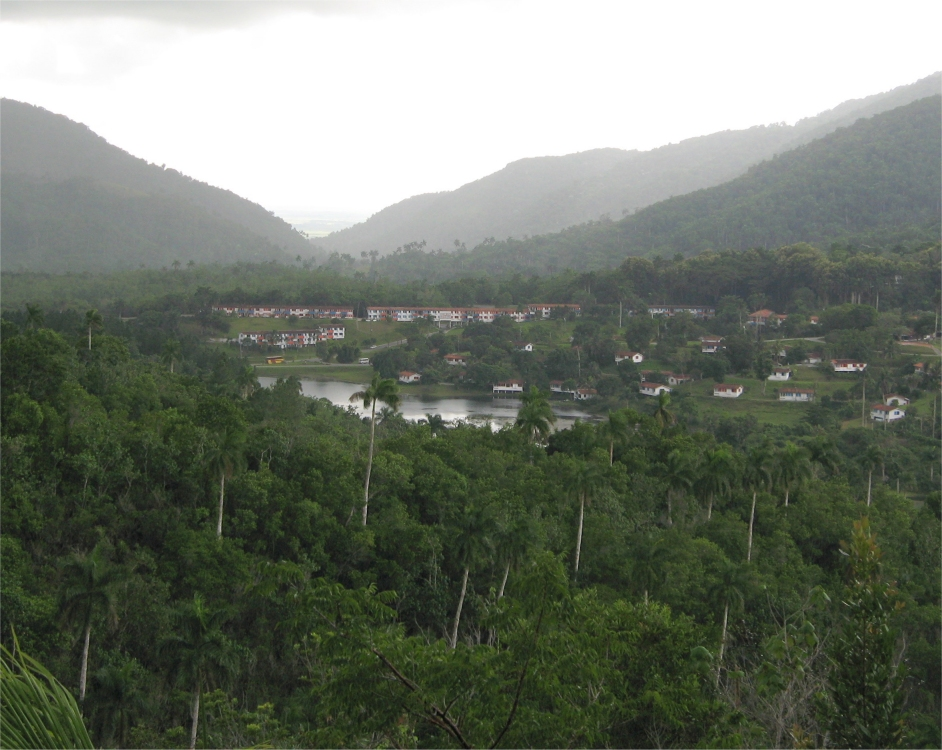
- View of the village and surrounding forest

- Location of Esperanza in Cuba
- Coordinates: 22°50′42″N 82°56′35″W
- Country: Cuba
- Province: Artemisa
- Municipality: Candelaria
- Elevation: 200 m (660 ft)

Population
  - Total: 1,000
- Time zone: UTC-5 (EST)
- Area code: +53-82
- Website: Official website

Las Terrazas is a small community and nature reserve in the municipality of Candelaria, Artemisa Province, Cuba. It is located in the Sierra del Rosario mountains (part of Guaniguanico range), which was designated a Biosphere Reserve by UNESCO in 1984.

== Overview ==
The village has a population of about 1,000 and a number of hotels and restaurants catering for tourists. The nature reserve includes 5000 ha of secondary forest which was planted on the surrounding (deforested) hills by building terraces to avoid erosion; hence the name (in Spanish, terrazas means terraces).

The reserve is rich in flora and fauna, and includes lakes, rivers, and waterfalls. Organised excursions on the many footpaths and trails can be booked at the local tourist office.

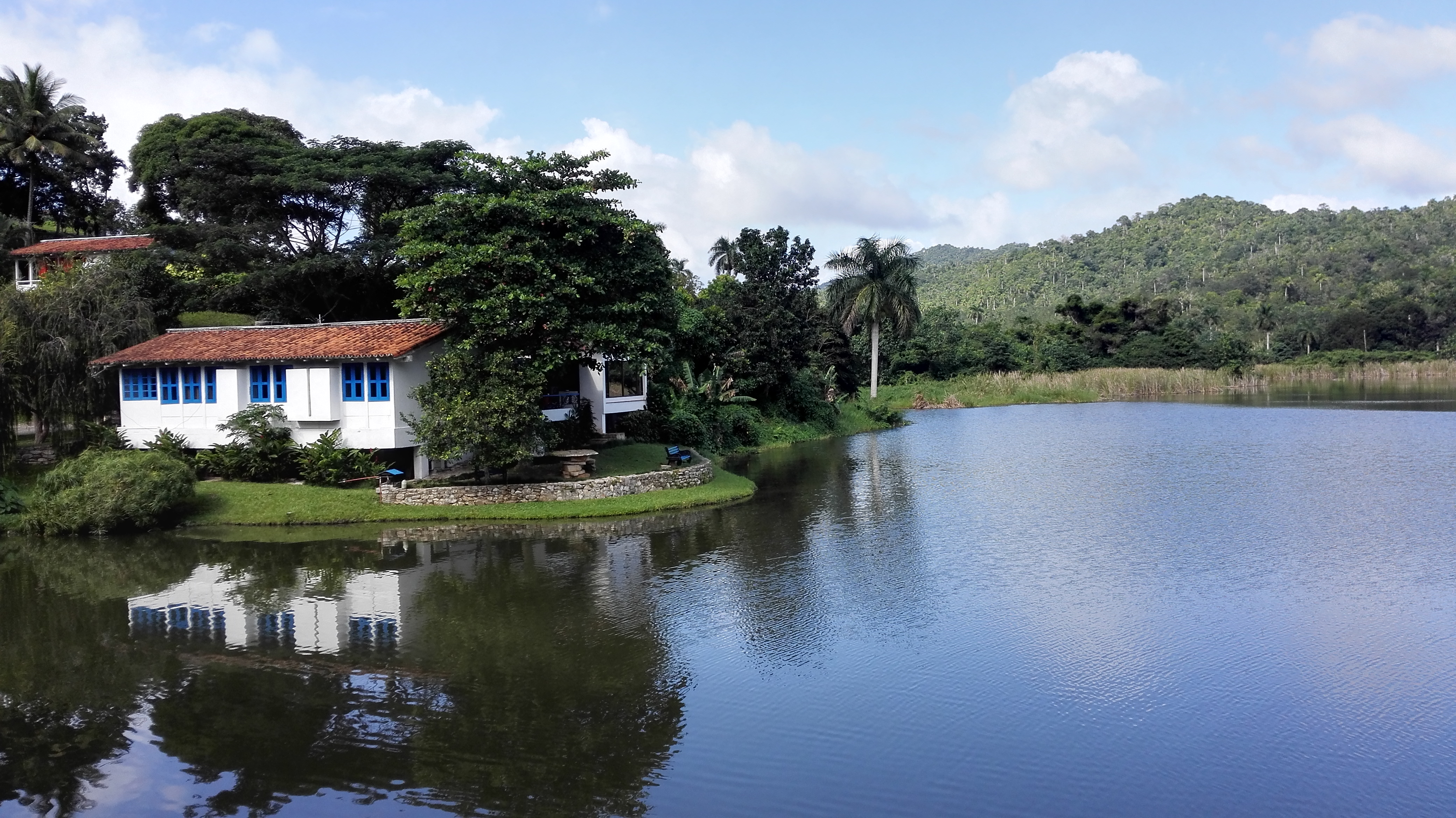
Polo Montañez house-museum

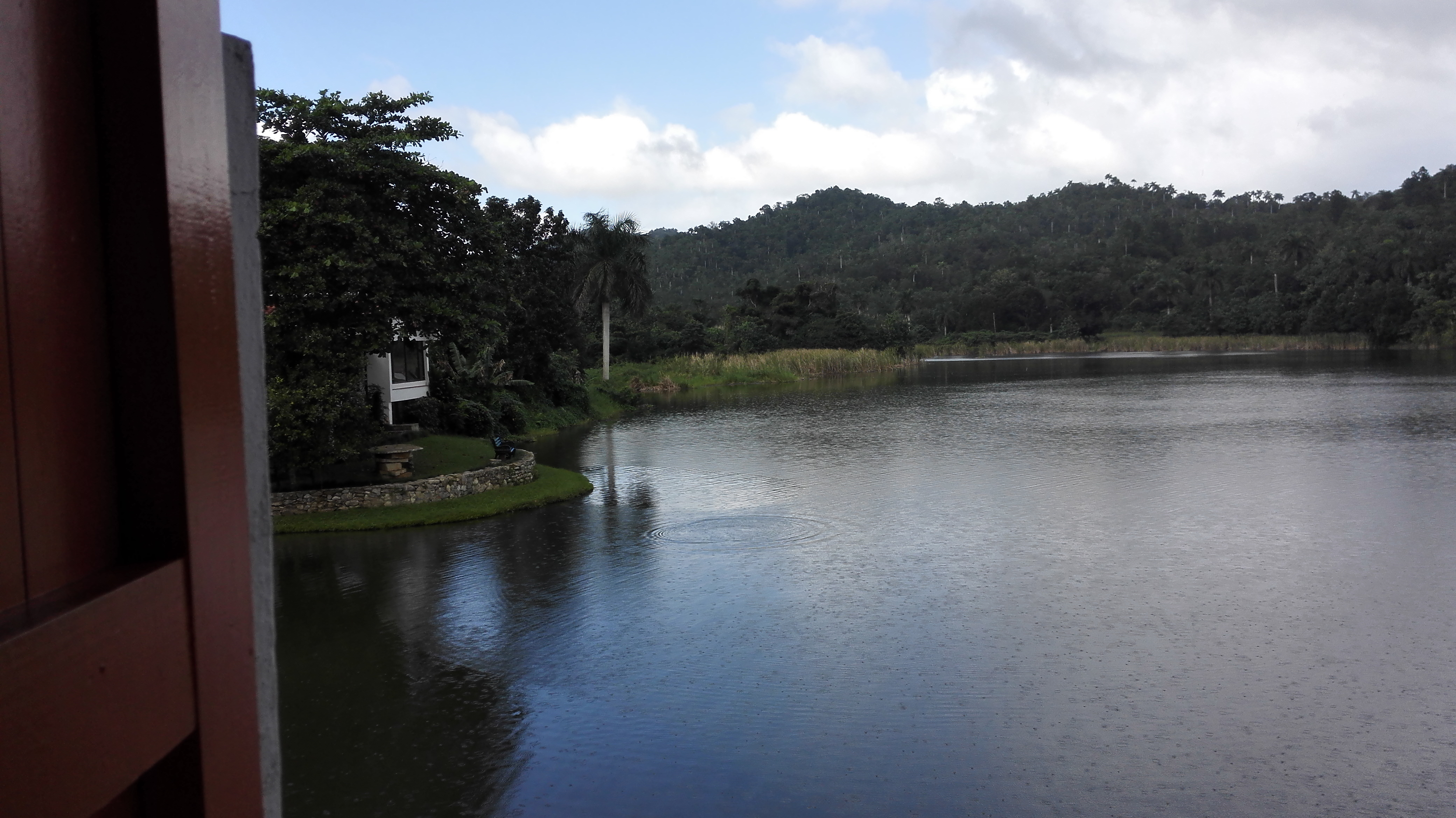
View from Polo Montañez house-museum

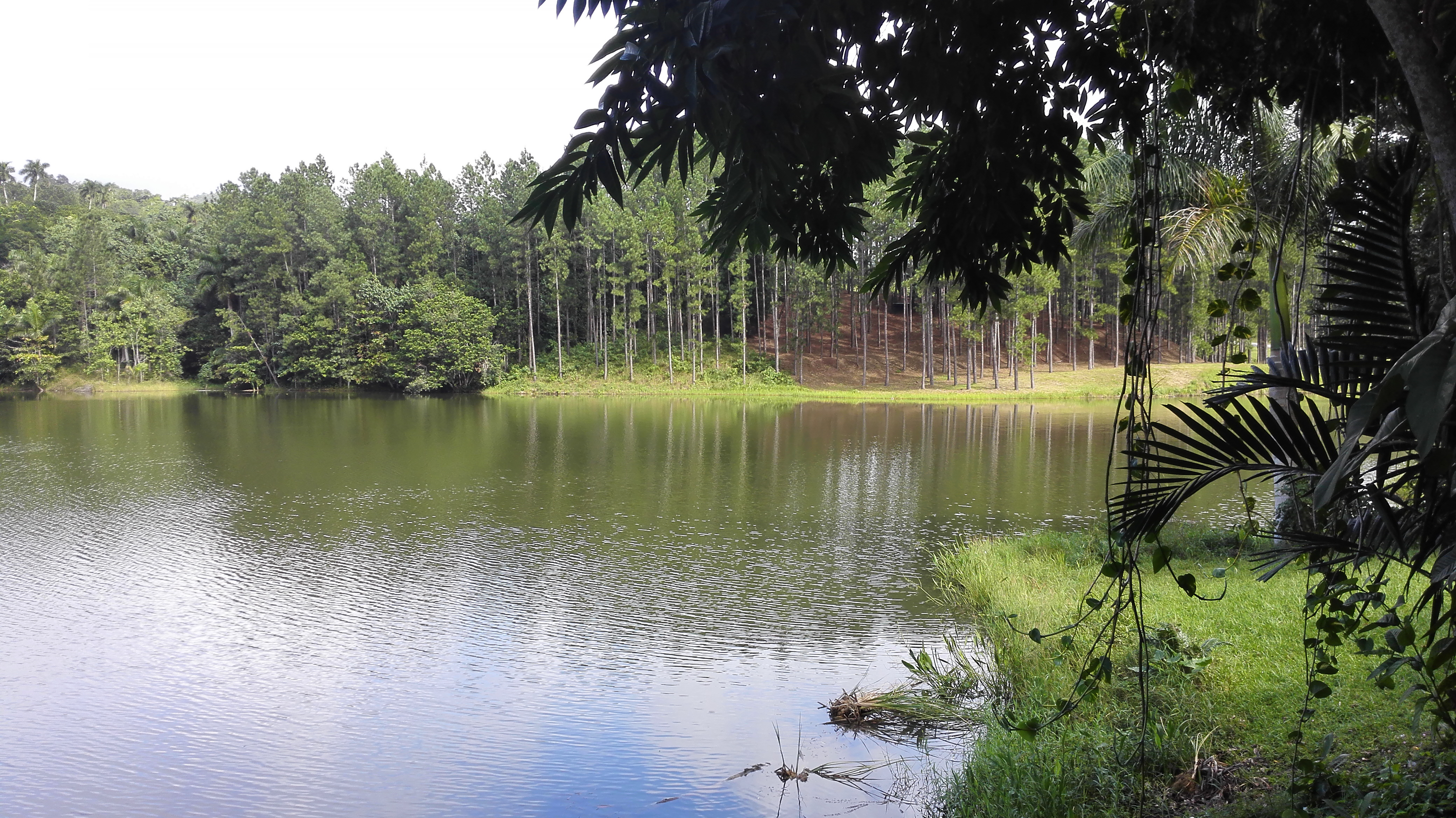
View from Polo Montañez house-museum

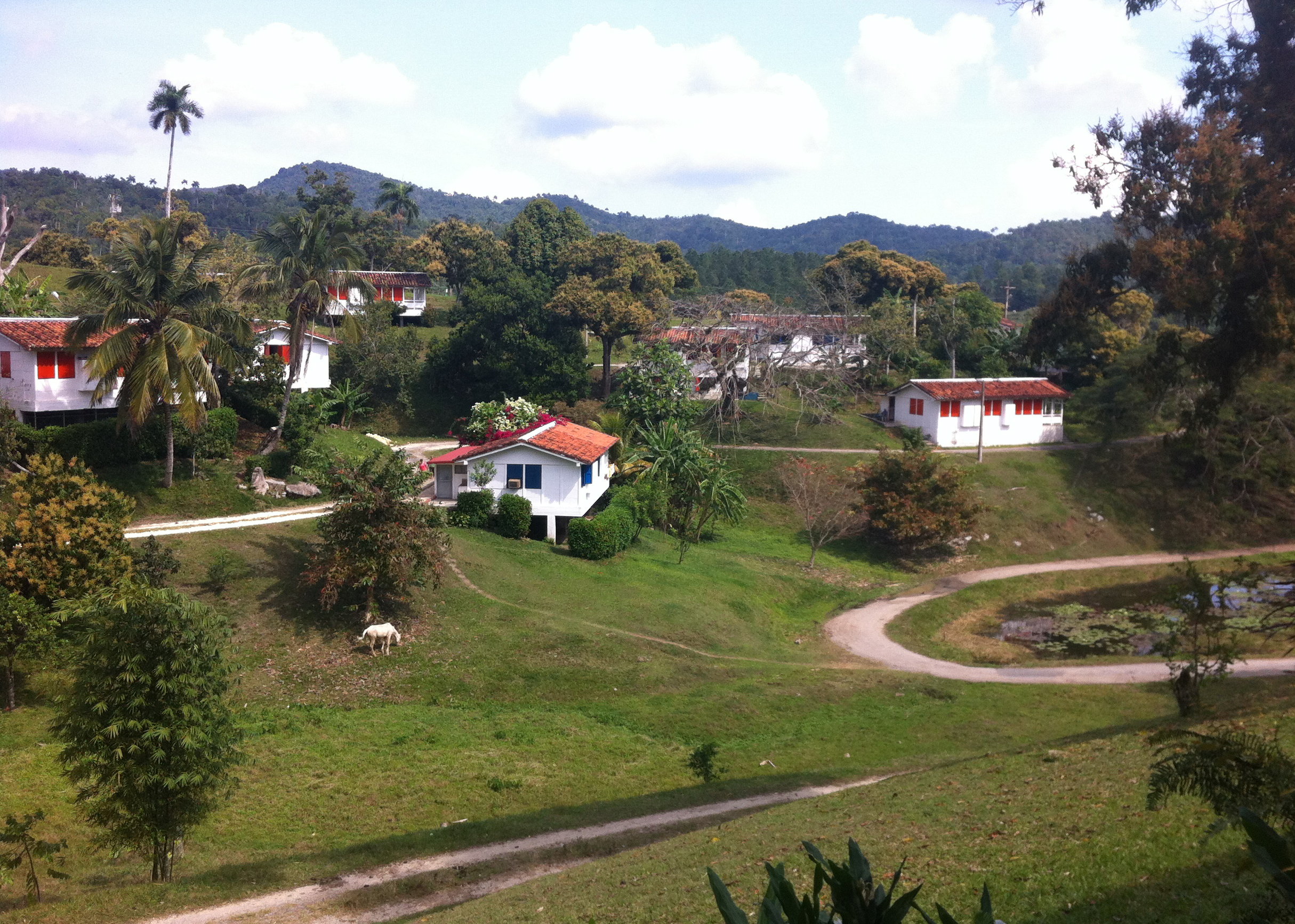

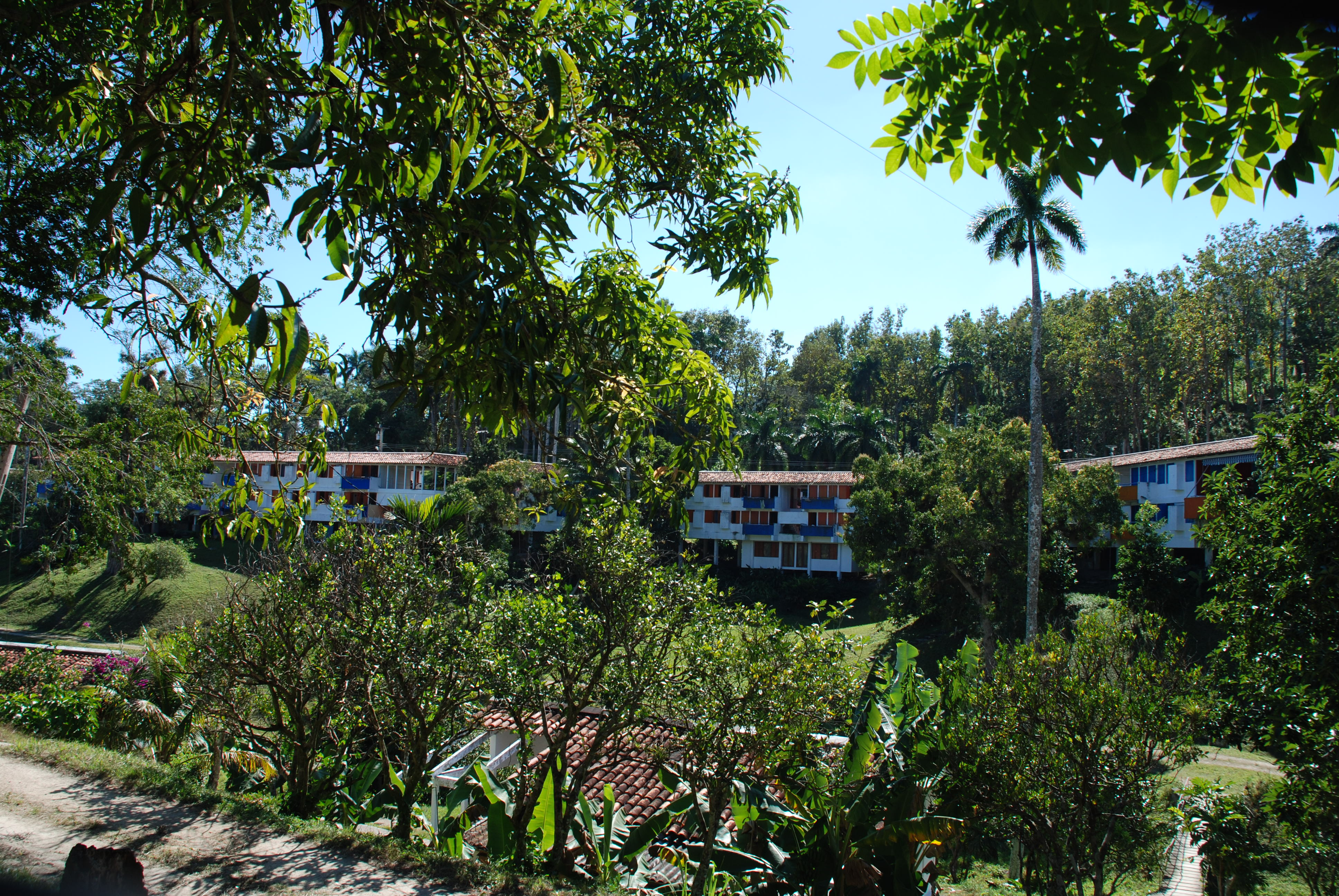

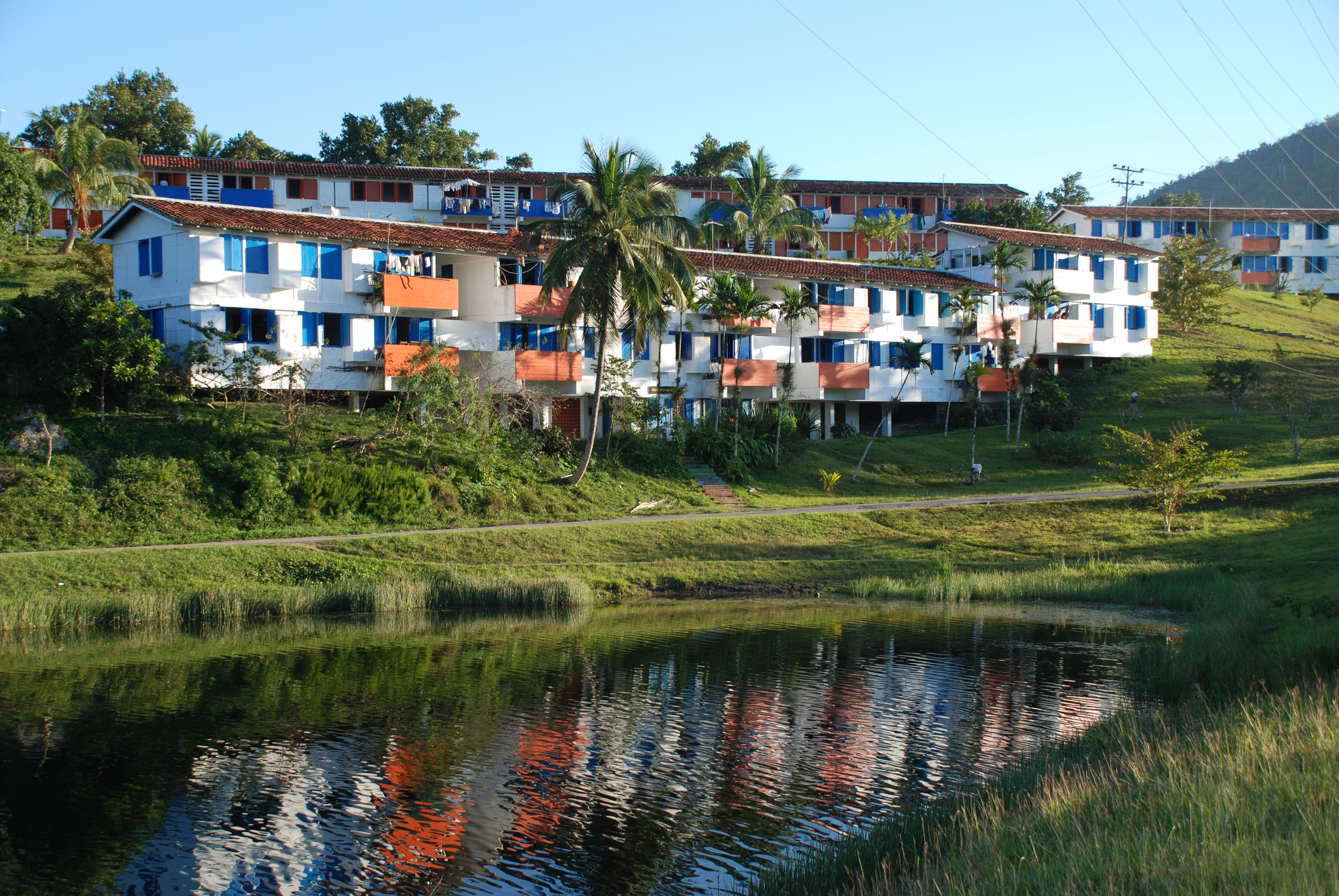

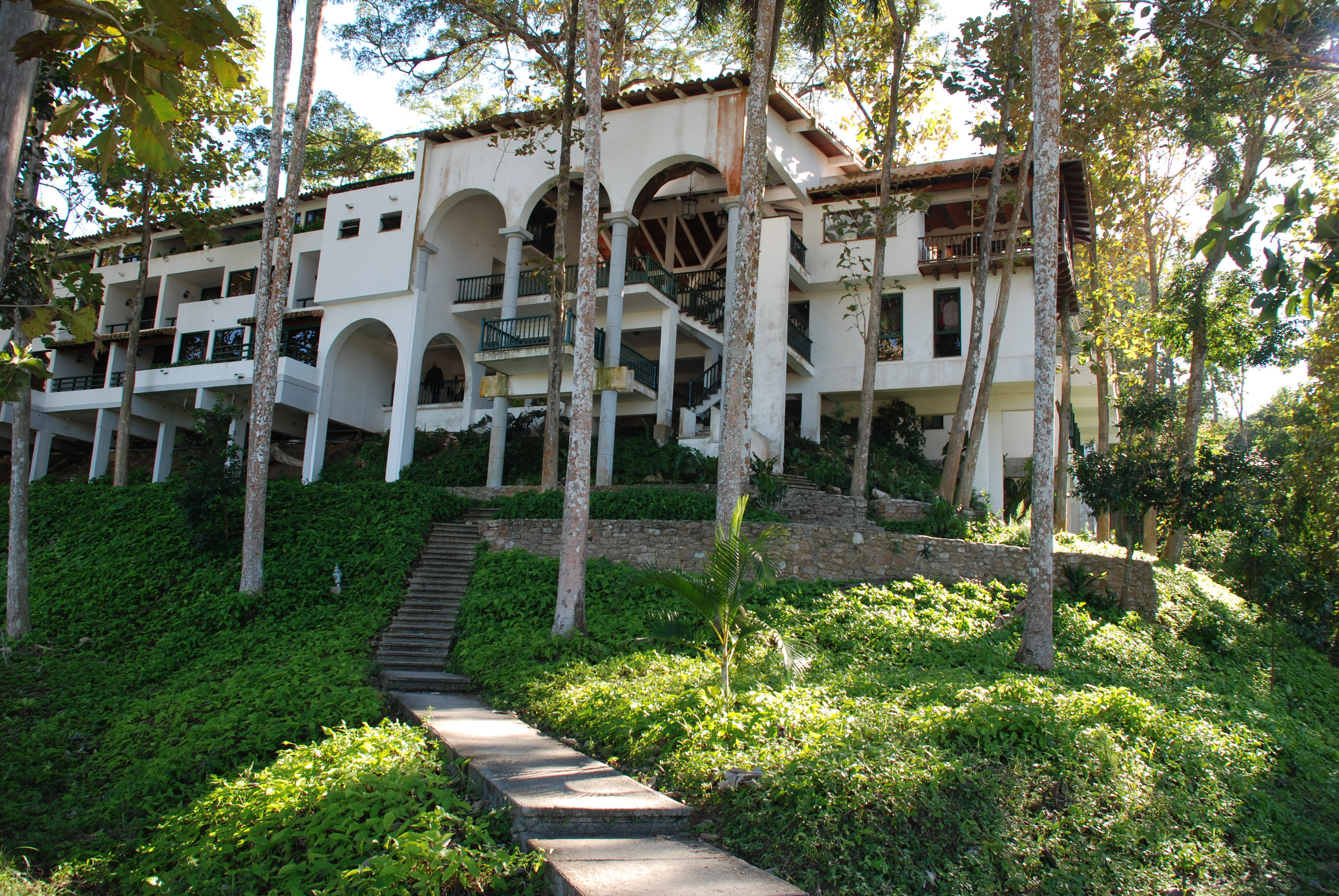

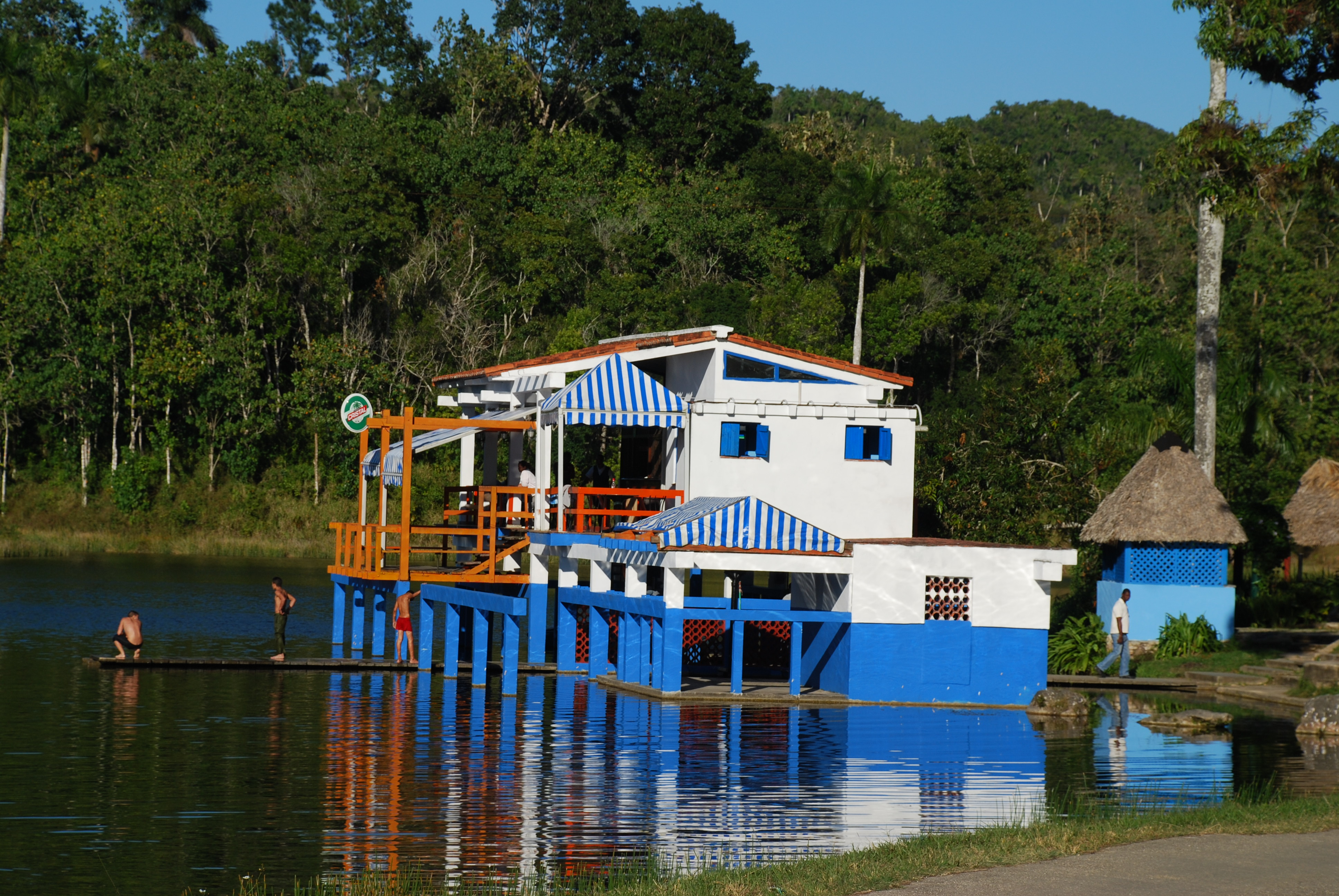
