= Minas de Matahambre =

- Municipality
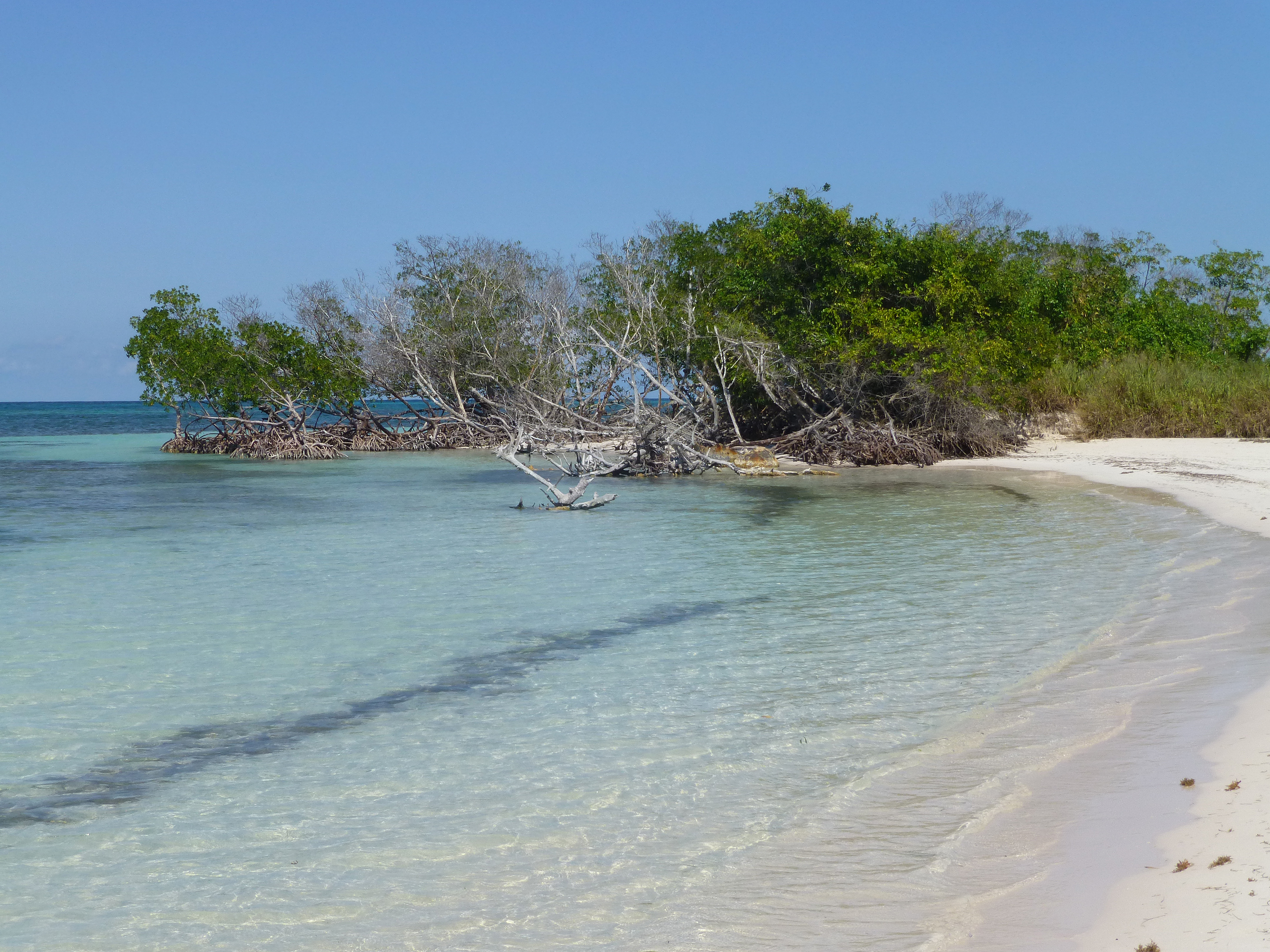
- Cayo Jutías, part of the municipality and of the Colorados Archipelago

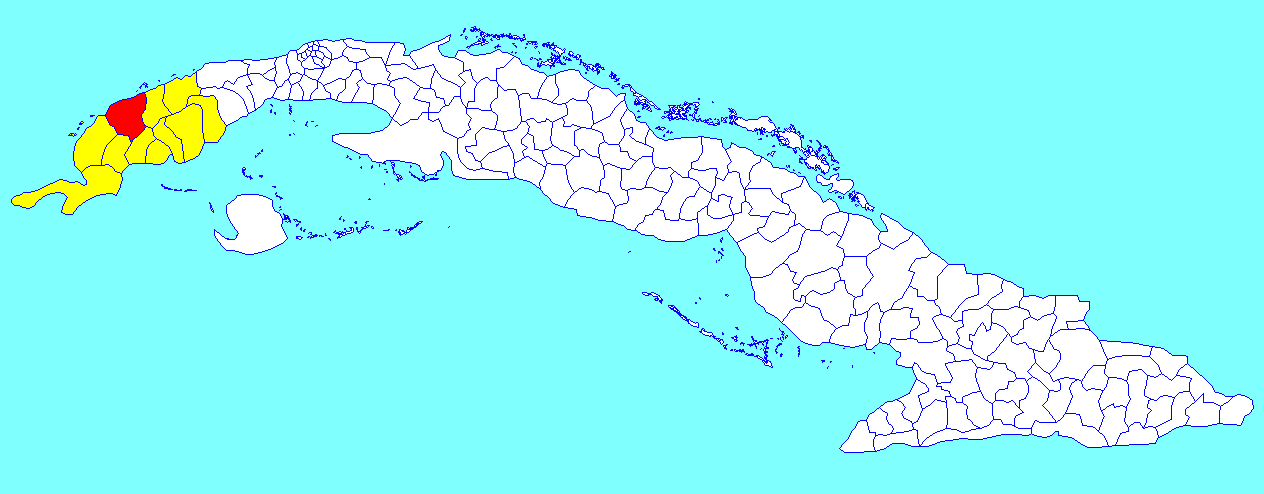
- Minas de Matahambre municipality (red) within Pinar del Río Province (yellow) and Cuba
- Coordinates: 22°34′56″N 83°56′57″W
- Country: Cuba
- Province: Pinar del Río

Area
  - Total: 858 km^{2} (331 sq mi)
- Elevation: 115 m (377 ft)

Population (2022)
  - Total: 30,946
  - Density: 36.1/km^{2} (93.4/sq mi)
- Time zone: UTC-5 (EST)
- Area code: +53-82

Minas de Matahambre (Spanish pronunciation: [minas ðe mataˈambɾe]) is a municipality and town in the Pinar del Río Province of Cuba. It was declared a National Monument of Cuba.

== Geography ==
The municipality faces the Gulf of Mexico to the north, where the cays of the Colorados Archipelago are developed off-shore. It is bordered by the municipalities of Mantua, Guane, San Juan y Martínez and Viñales.

The municipality includes the villages of Baja, Cabezas, Pons, La Sabana, Río del Medio, Santa Lucía, Sitio Morales and Sumidero.

== Demographics ==
In 2022, the municipality of Minas de Matahambre had a population of 30,946. With a total area of 858 km^{2} (331 sq mi), it has a population density of 36/km^{2} (93/sq mi).

== Culture ==
The Minas de Matahambre Municipal Museum holds objects and photography collections of local history.

== See also ==
- Municipalities of Cuba
- List of cities in Cuba
