= La Palma, Cuba =

La Palma
- Municipality
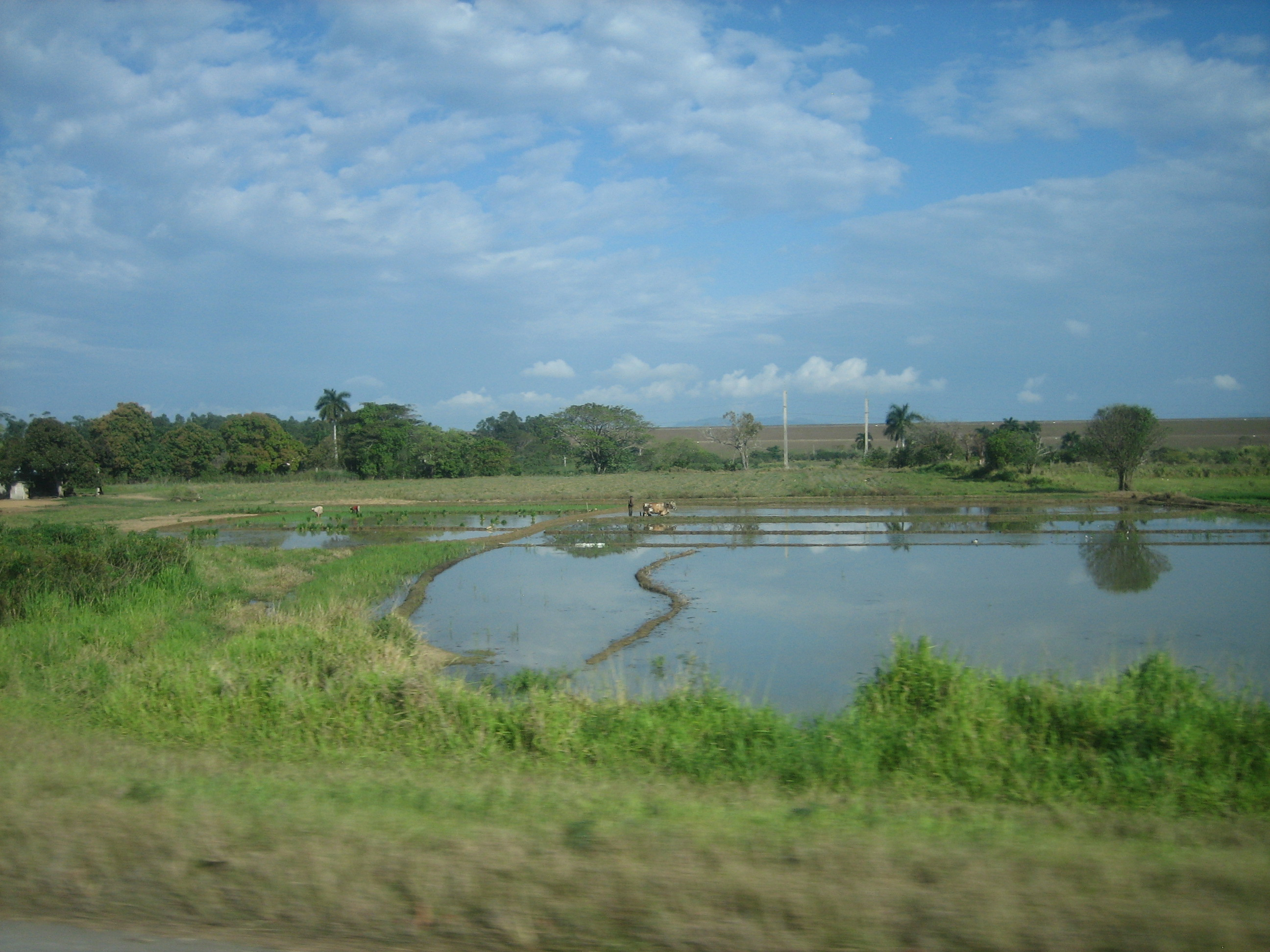
- A rice field in La Palma

- Coat of arms

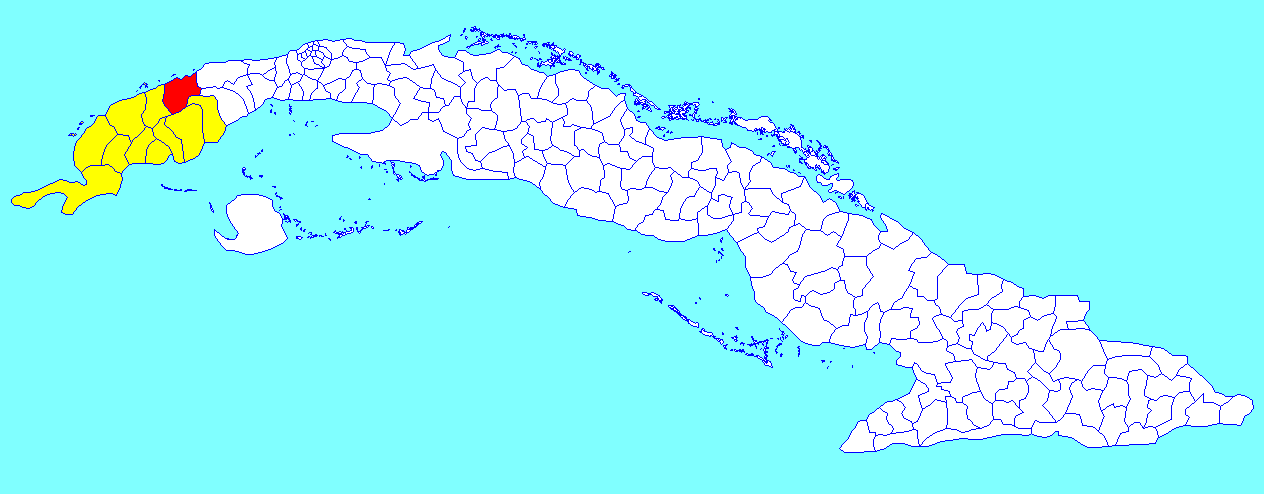
- La Palma municipality (red) within Pinar del Río Province (yellow) and Cuba
- Coordinates: 22°44′50″N 83°33′9″W
- Country: Cuba
- Province: Pinar del Río

Area
  - Total: 621 km^{2} (240 sq mi)
- Elevation: 50 m (160 ft)

Population (2022)
  - Total: 33,352
  - Density: 53.7/km^{2} (139/sq mi)
- Time zone: UTC-5 (EST)
- Area code: +53-82

La Palma is a municipality and town in the Pinar del Río Province of Cuba. It is located in the northern part of the province, on the coast of the Straits of Florida, north of Consolación del Sur and north-east of Viñales.

== Overview ==
The Viñales Valley World Heritage Site is located west of La Palma, while the Sierra del Rosario Biosphere Reserve extends to the east. Cayo Levisa, a popular tourist attraction, is a cay of the Colorados Archipelago, located 2 kilometres (1.2 mi) north of the municipality's northern coast.

La Palma Municipal Museum is located in the Martí street.

== Demographics ==
In 2022, the municipality of La Palma had a population of 33,352. With a total area of 621 km^{2} (240 sq mi), it has a population density of 54/km^{2} (140/sq mi).

== See also ==
- Municipalities of Cuba
- List of cities in Cuba
