= San Cristóbal, Cuba =

Cristóbal
- Municipality
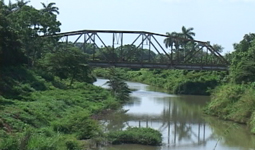
- A bridge over the Río San Cristóbal

- Coat of arms

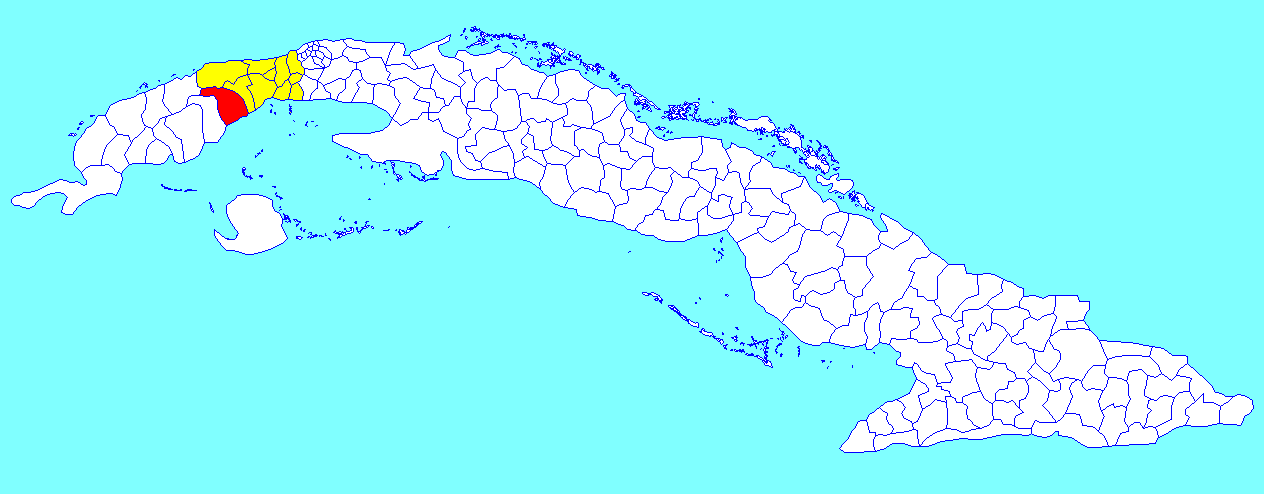
- San Cristóbal municipality (red) within Artemisa Province (yellow) and Cuba
- Coordinates: 22°43′1″N 83°03′4″W
- Country: Cuba
- Province: Artemisa

Area
  - Total: 934.9 km^{2} (361.0 sq mi)
- Elevation: 50 m (160 ft)

Population (2022)
  - Total: 71,098
  - Density: 76.05/km^{2} (197.0/sq mi)
- Time zone: UTC-5 (EST)
- Area code: +53-82

San Cristóbal is a municipality and city which since 2011 has been included in Artemisa Province of Cuba. Spread over an area of 934.9 km^{2} (361.0 sq mi), it is located on the foothills of the Sierra de los Órganos (Organ mountains) in western Cuba. The city was founded by Spanish colonial settlers as an agricultural center. The municipality became internationally significant in October 1962 during the Cuban Missile Crisis, after Soviet missile sites were first photographed by United States reconnaissance aircraft at San Cristóbal.

== History ==
The city was founded during the Spanish colonial period with the first settlers coming from Cádiz in Spain and the Canary Islands. The early settlers developed it into an agricultural region, growing tobacco. In the 18th century, several coffee plantations were established due to the presence of fertile soil in the region. San Cristóbal was one of the termini of an old military road built during the beginning of the Cuban Republic.

=== Cuban missile crisis ===
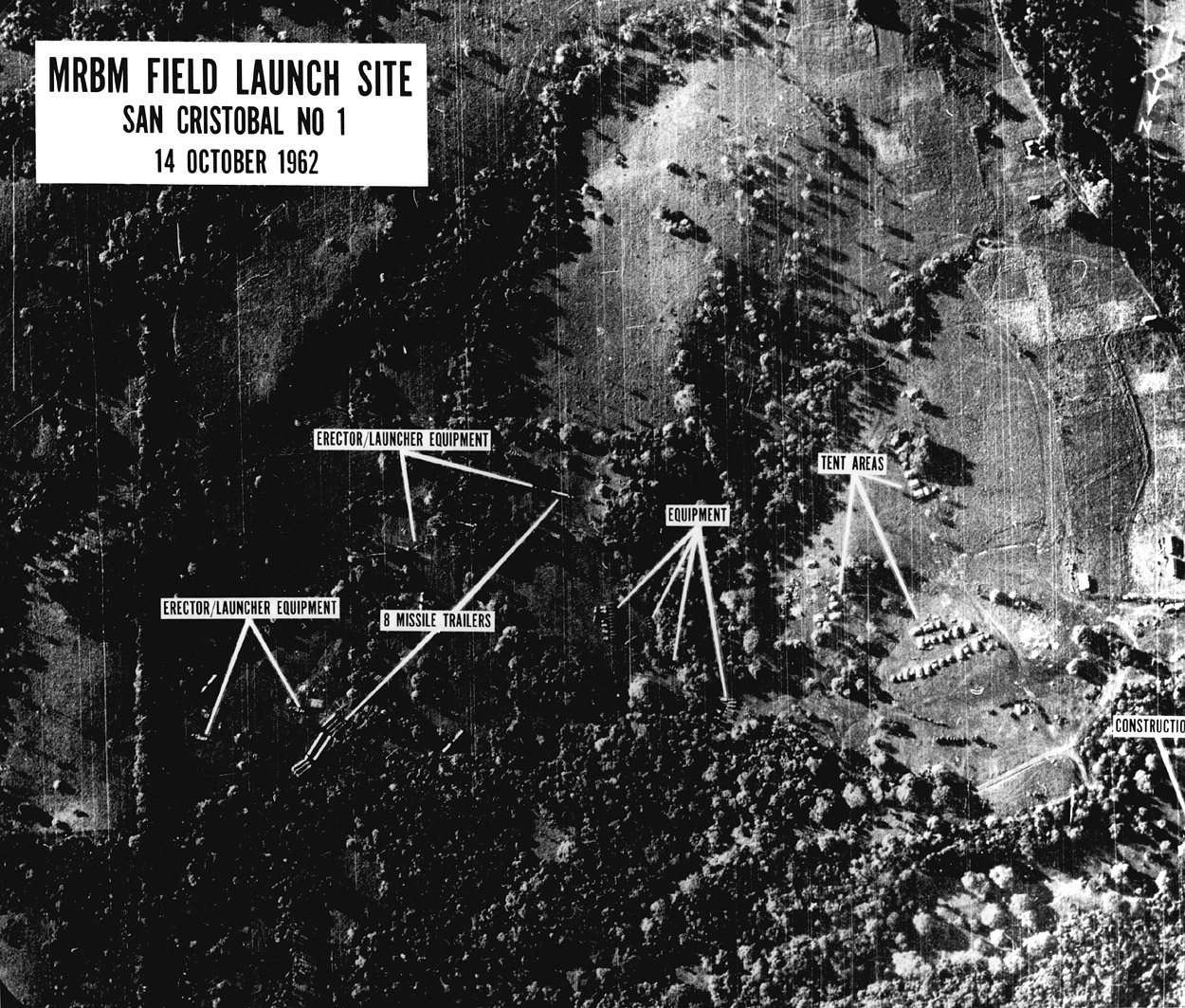
Reconnaissance image of missile bases under construction at San Cristóbal taken on 14 October 1962

The municipality became internationally significant in October 1962 during the Cuban Missile Crisis. The first photographic evidence of the Soviet missile launch sites were discovered on 14 October 1962, when a Lockheed U-2 aircraft piloted by Richard Heyser captured images of a missile construction site at San Cristóbal. This led to the further naval blockade of Cuba by the United States, and its subsequent face-off with the Soviet Union. The crisis was resolved later after the Soviet missiles were withdrawn and the United States withdrew its naval blockade in 1963.

== Geography ==
San Cristóbal is located in the Artemisa Province and covers an area of 934.9 km^{2} (361.0 sq mi). It is located on the foothills of the Sierra de los Órganos (Organ mountains) in western Cuba. about 92 km (57 mi) west of the Cuban capital of Havana. The San Cristóbal Municipal Museum was established on 31 May 1983.

== Demographics ==
The municipality had a reported population of 71,098 inhabitants in 2022. The population consisted of 35,641 males and 35,457 females. About 11,784 inhabitants (16.4%) were below the age of fourteen. Majority (68.7%) of the population was classified as urban, and the rest (31.3%) as rural.

== See also ==
- Municipalities of Cuba
- List of cities in Cuba
- San Cristóbal Municipal Museum
