= Candelaria, Cuba =

Candelaria
- Municipality
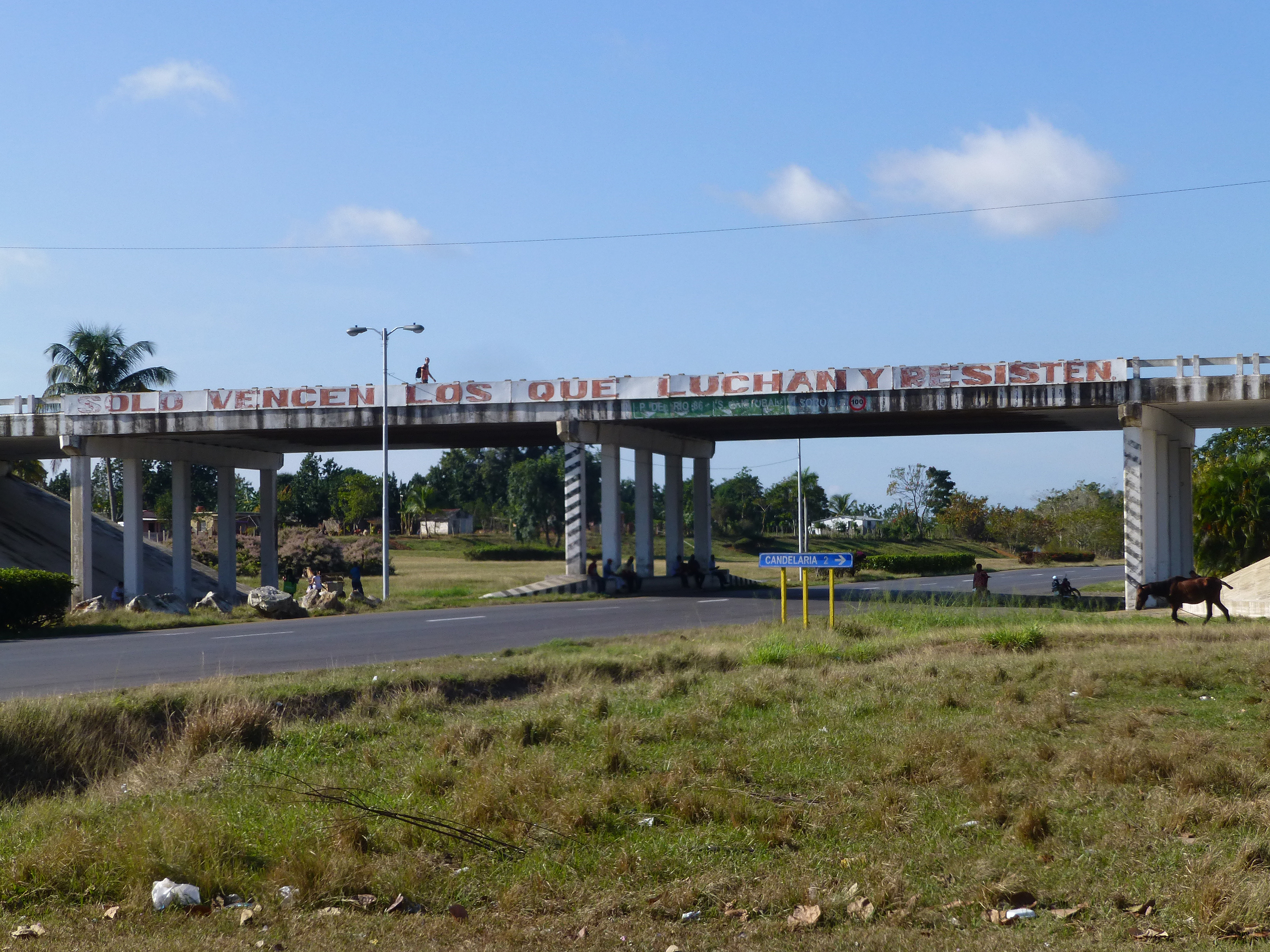
- The A4 motorway exit of Candelaria

- Coat of arms

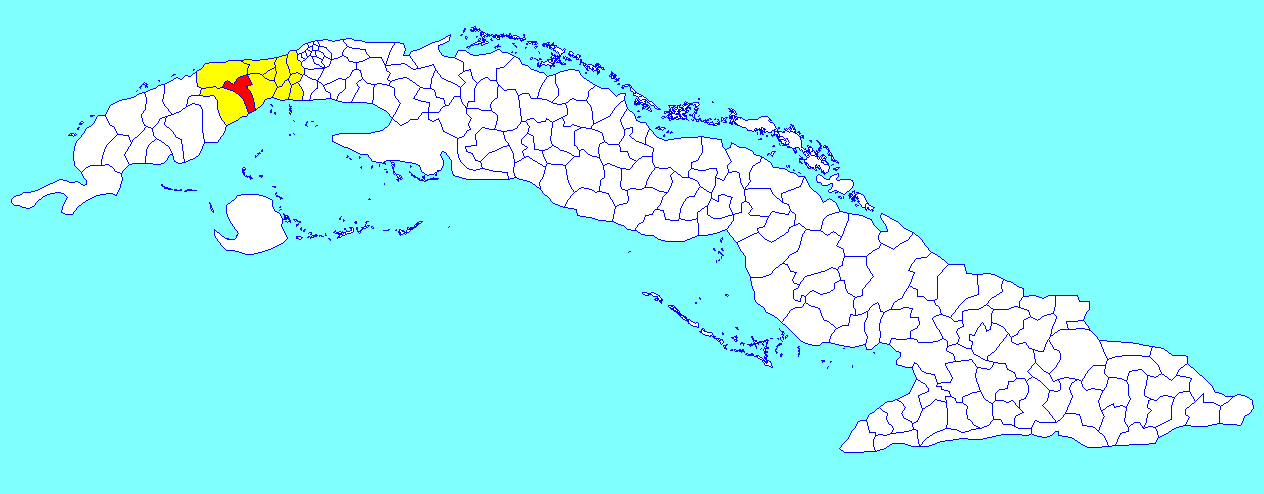
- Candelaria municipality (red) within Artemisa Province (yellow) and Cuba
- Coordinates: 22°44′38″N 82°57′29″W
- Country: Cuba
- Province: Artemisa
- Founded: 1809
- Established: 1880

Area
  - Total: 299 km^{2} (115 sq mi)
- Elevation: 50 m (160 ft)

Population (2022)
  - Total: 21,368
  - Density: 71.5/km^{2} (185/sq mi)
- Time zone: UTC-5 (EST)
- Area code: +53-82
- Climate: Am

Candelaria is a municipality and town in the Artemisa Province of Cuba. Before 2011 it was part of Pinar del Río Province. It was founded in 1809, and established as a municipality in 1880.

== Geography ==
The municipality is divided into the barrios of Bayate, Carambola, Frías, Lomas, Pasto Rico, Pueblo, Pueblo Nuevo, Punta Brava, Río Hondo, San Juan de Contreras, San Juan del Norte, Soroa and Las Terrazas. The waterfall Salto de Soroa is located within the municipal territory.

== Demographics ==
In 2022, the municipality of Candelaria had a population of 21,368. With a total area of 299 km^{2} (115 sq mi), it has a population density of 71/km^{2} (180/sq mi).

== See also ==
- Municipalities of Cuba
- List of cities in Cuba
- Candelaria Municipal Museum
