= Viñales Valley =

Karstic depression in Cuba

- Valle de Viñales
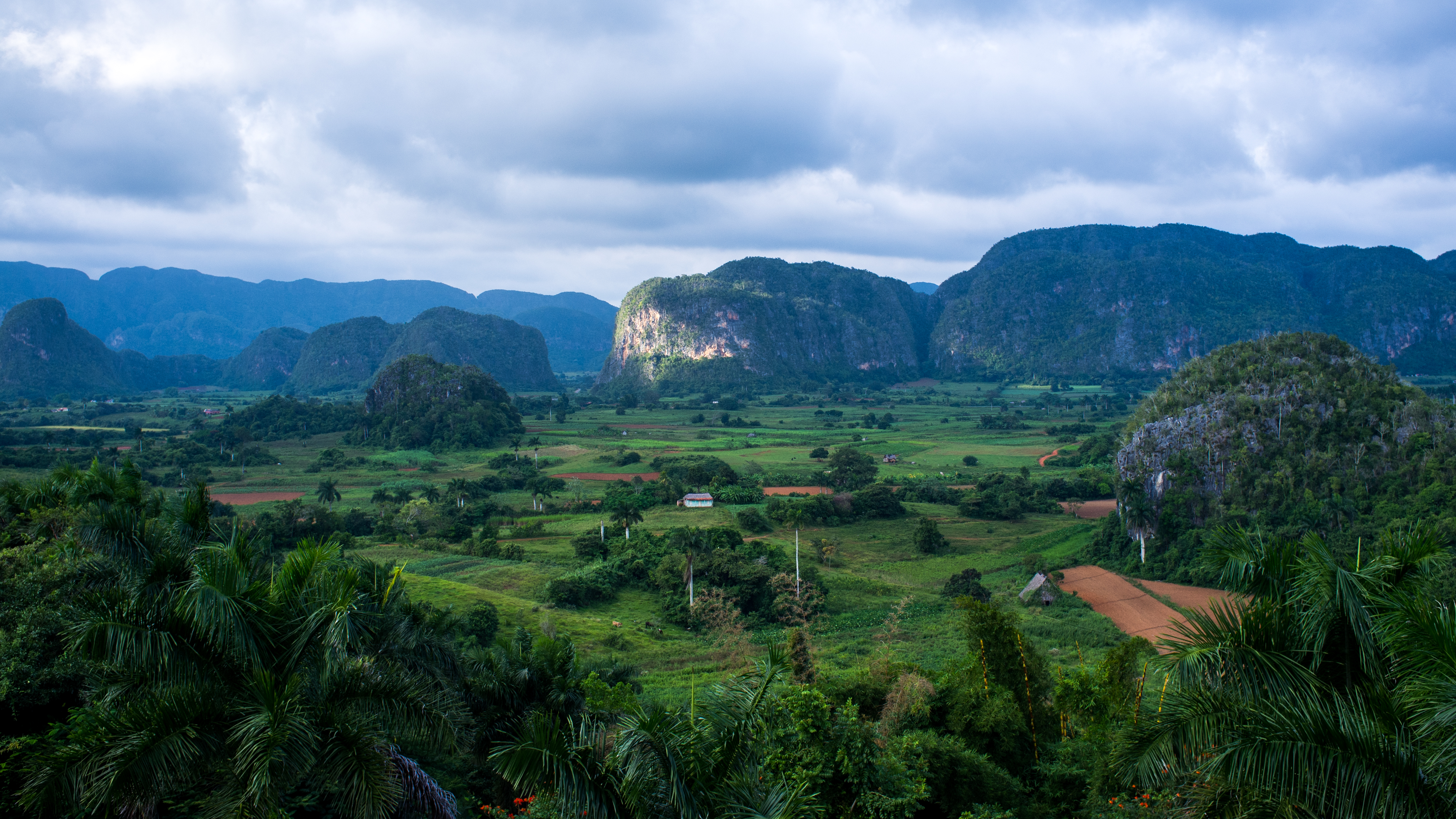
- View of the Viñales Valley

- Location within Cuba
- Area: 132 km^{2} (51 sq mi)

Geography
- Location: Viñales, Cuba
- Coordinates: 22°37′N 83°43′W
- Interactive map of Viñales Valley

UNESCO World Heritage Site
- Type: Cultural
- Criteria: iv
- Designated: 1999 (23rd session)
- Reference no.: 840rev
- Region: Latin America and the Caribbean

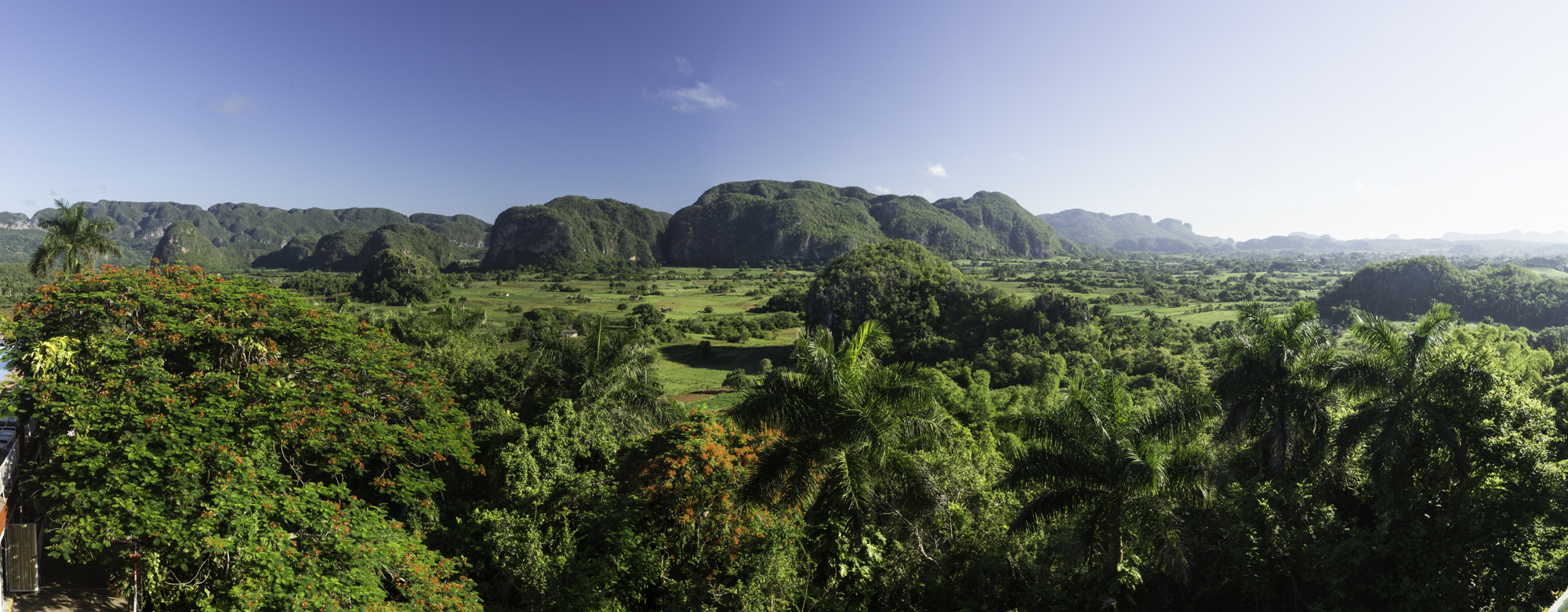

Viñales Valley (Spanish: Valle de Viñales) is a karstic depression in Cuba. The valley has an area of 132 km^{2} (51 sq mi) and is located in the Sierra de los Órganos mountains (part of Guaniguanico range), just north of Viñales in the Pinar del Río Province.

In 1999, the valley was inscribed as a UNESCO World Heritage Site as a natural and cultural landscape because of its use of traditional tobacco-growing techniques.

== Overview ==
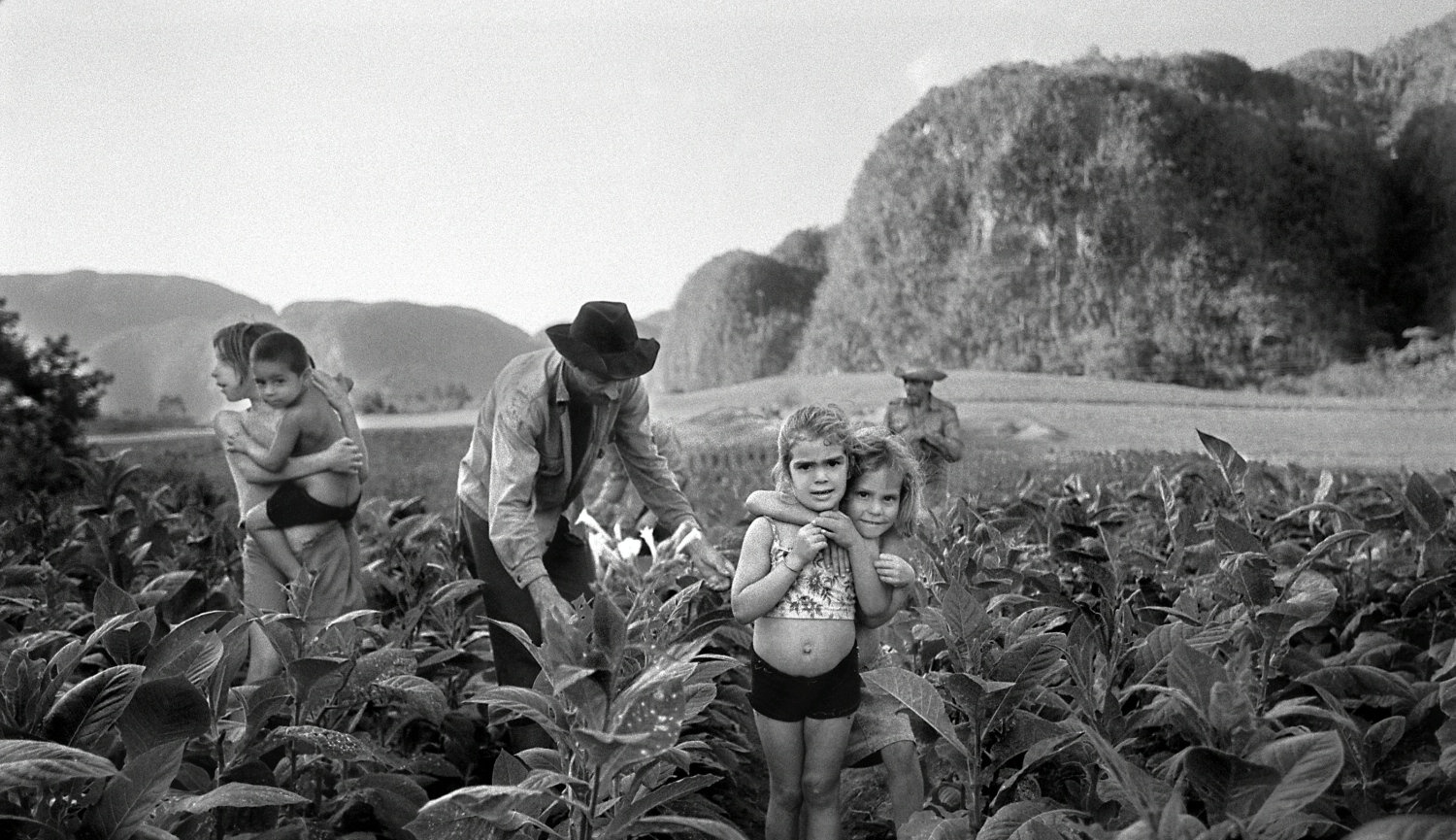
Manuel Rivera-Ortiz: Tobacco Harvesting, Viñales Valley, Cuba 2002

Tobacco and other crops are cultivated on the bottom of the valley, mostly by traditional agriculture techniques that have been in use for several centuries. These labor-intensive techniques are said to make for higher-quality tobacco than if mechanical methods are used.

The valley is dotted with small farms and villages which have been occupied since the time of the 'conquistadores'. Some vernacular colonial-era architecture is maintained. The culture of the valley has been influenced by a mixture of cultures: indigenous peoples, enslaved black Africans and their free descendants, and Spanish colonizers and later Europeans.

Many caves may be entered from openings in the surrounding hillfaces, including Cueva del Indio and Cueva de José Miguel. The conspicuous limestone mounds rising like islands from the bottom of the valley are called mogotes. They can be up to 300 m tall.

Viñales is a major tourist destination offering mainly hiking and rock climbing. The local climbing scene has started to take off in the early 21st century, with many new routes being discovered. These have stimulated an increase in local tourism.

== Geography ==
The extraordinary geomorphological formations known as mogotes, which are found nowhere else in Cuba, have sometimes not only attained the dimensions of mountains, but formed a variety of unusual shapes. The only comparable geological structures in the world are those found in Southeast Asia, in the Malay Peninsula, Borneo, the Thai highlands, Laos, Vietnam, and in the South China Karst region.

In the valley, elevations such as Alturas de Pizarras are formed from a variety of rocks. They have been dated as the oldest existing in the country and also in the Caribbean area.

== Conservation ==
Many endemic plants and animals are specific to this valley. Flora found in the region include Pachira emarginata (syn. Bombax emarginatum), mountain palm (Gaussia princeps), Ekmanianthe actinophylla, and Microcycas calocoma.

Fauna includes bee hummingbird (Mellisuga helenae, zunzún), Cuban trogon (Priotelus temnurus), Cuban tody (Todus multicolor), Cuban solitaire (Myadestes elisabeth) and Cuban grassquit (Tiaris canorus).

== Mural of Prehistory ==
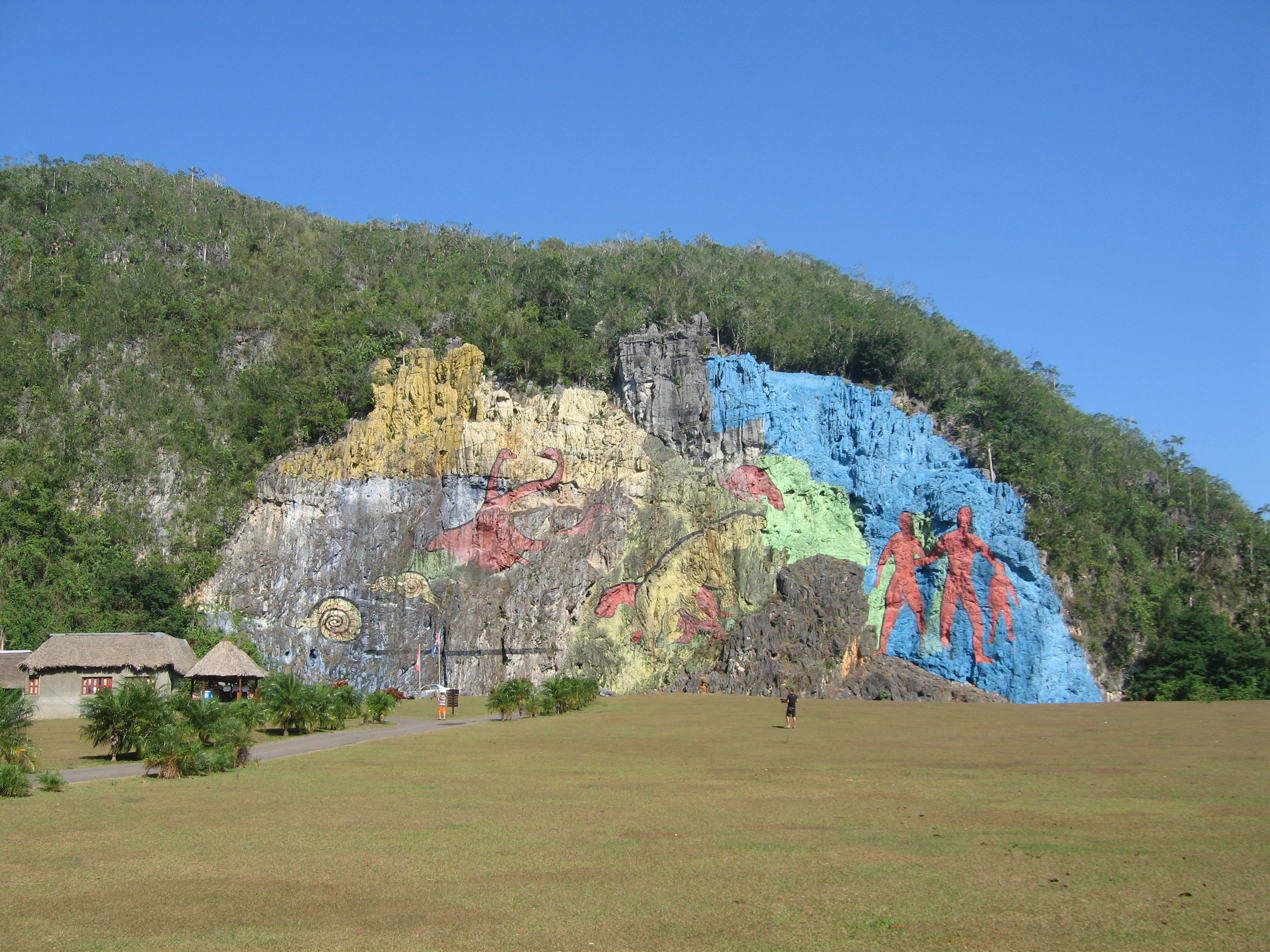
Mural in Viñales Valley

The valley of Dos Hermanas has what is known as the Mural of Prehistory, a contemporary work. It is painted on a stone of one of the elevations. This mural shows the evolution of life in a natural sense of Cuba.

The Mural of Prehistory is located in the mogote called Pita. It can be found on a perpendicular slope. The rock was washed and drains were made in it to avoid erosion due to the rain. It is 120 meters high and 160 meters in length. The artist was Leovigildo González Morillo, who was Director of Cartography of the Academy of Sciences of Cuba.

In it are represented Guanahatabeye Indians, species of mammals, gigantic animals, and some mollusks.

The Mural includes 12 sections, showing the evolutionary process of men and animals in the Sierra de los Órganos, in its different stages.

== Photo gallery ==
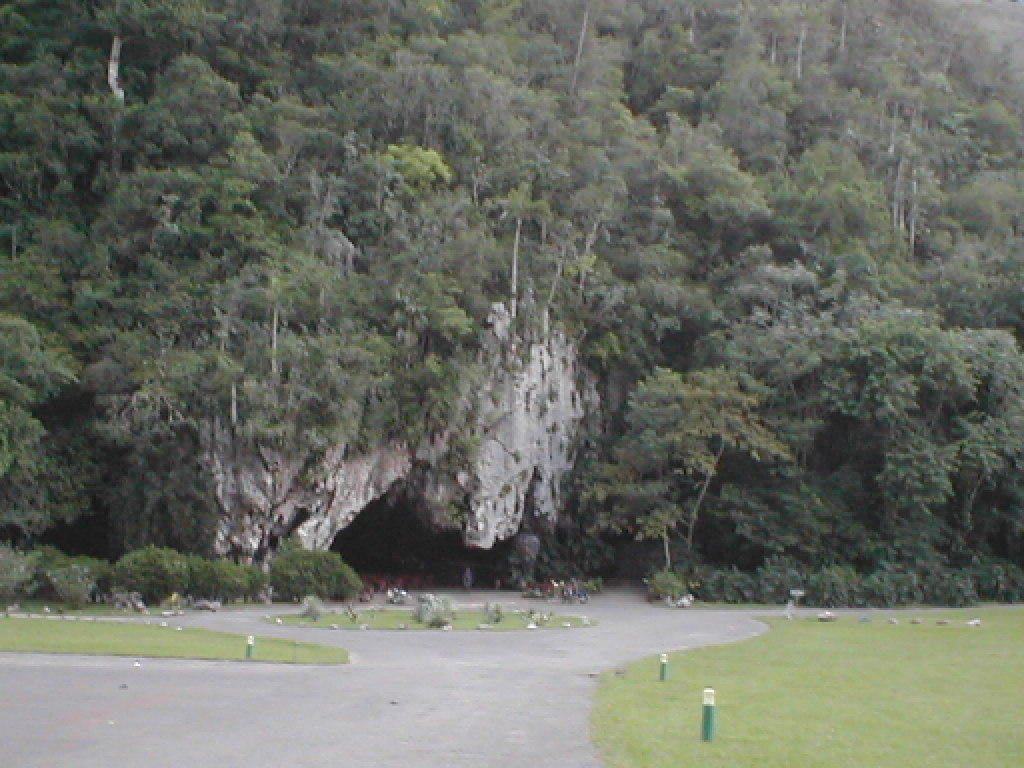
Palenque de los Cimarrones

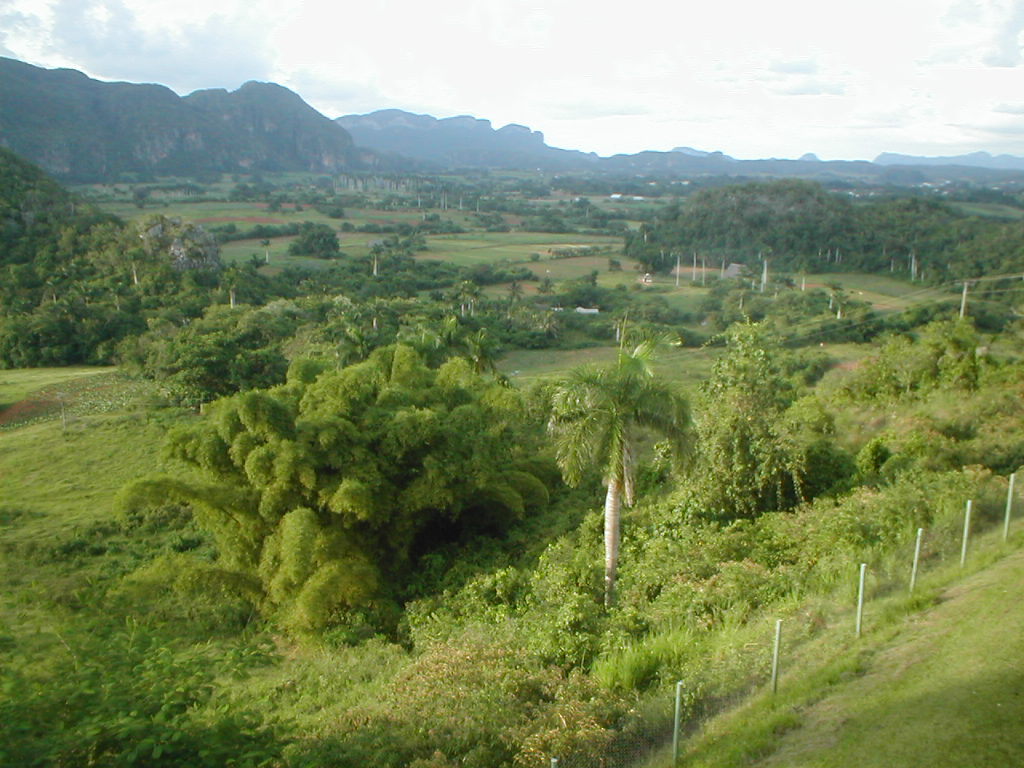
Viñales Valley

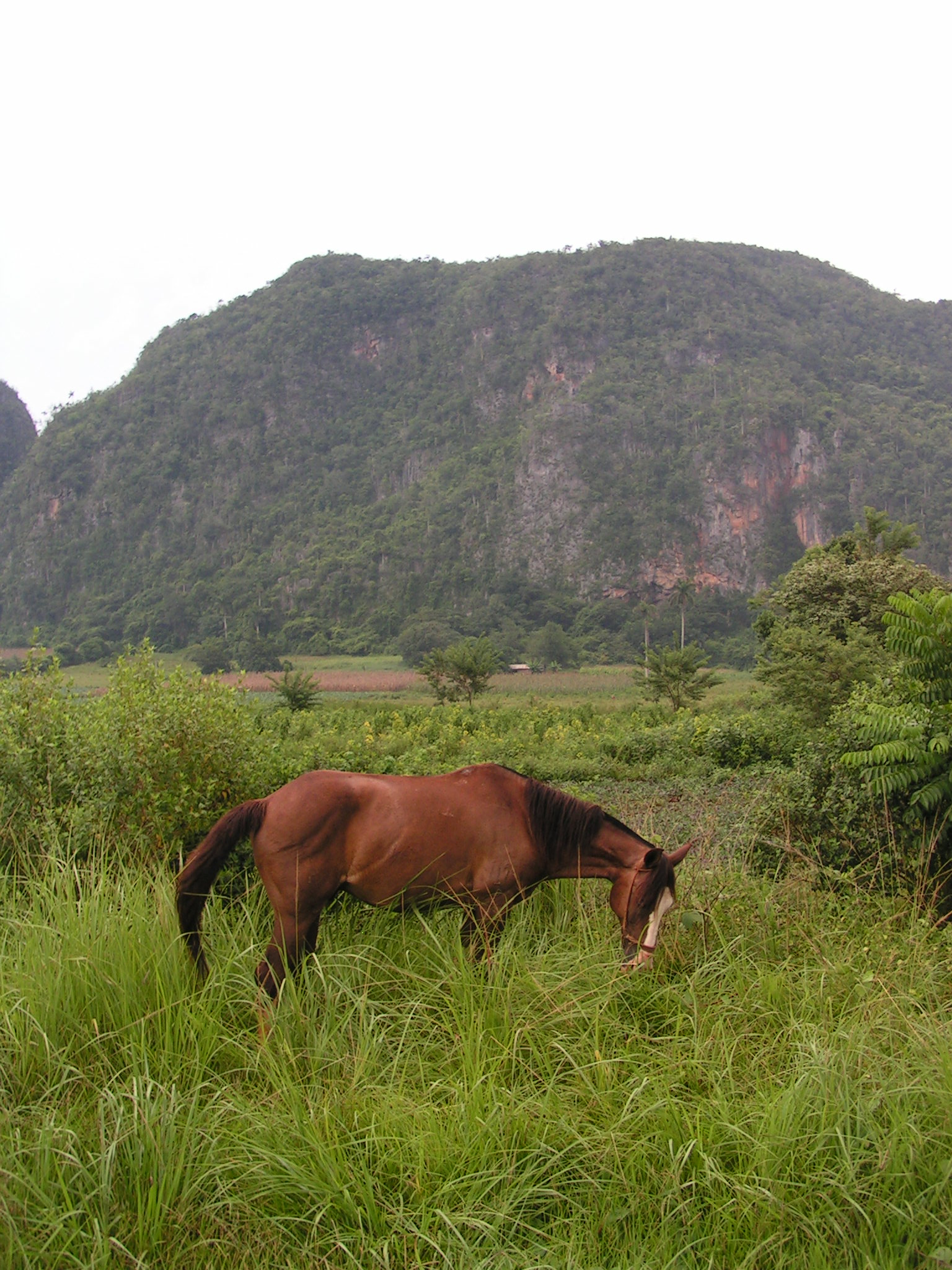
Viñales Valley

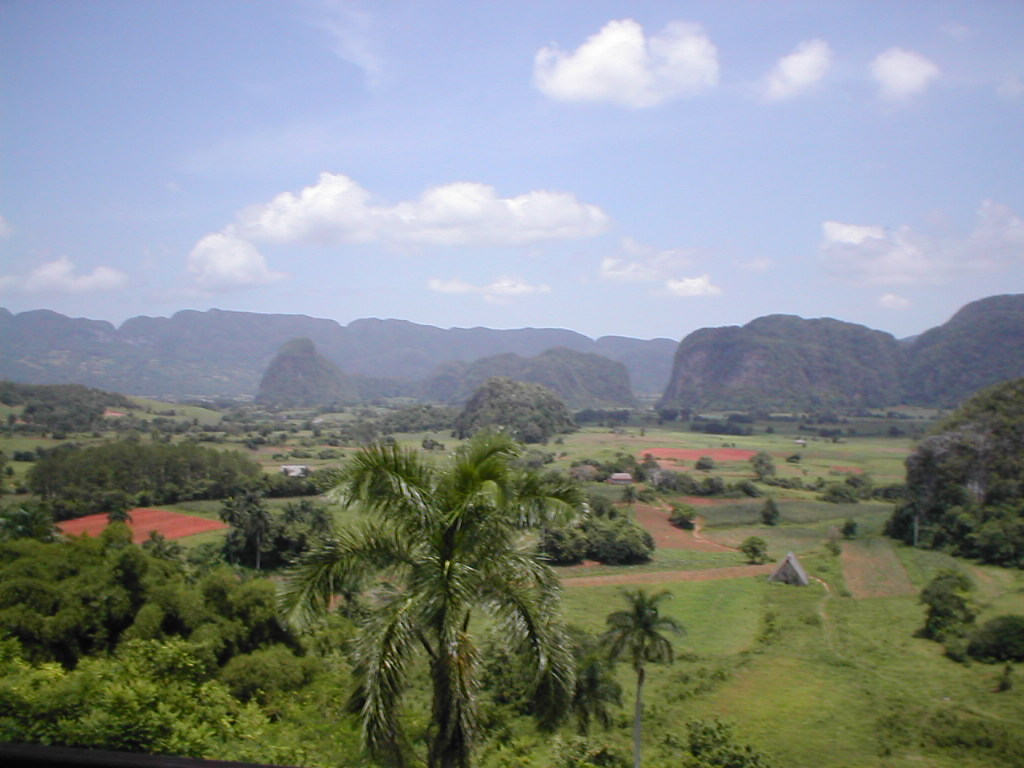
Viñales Valley

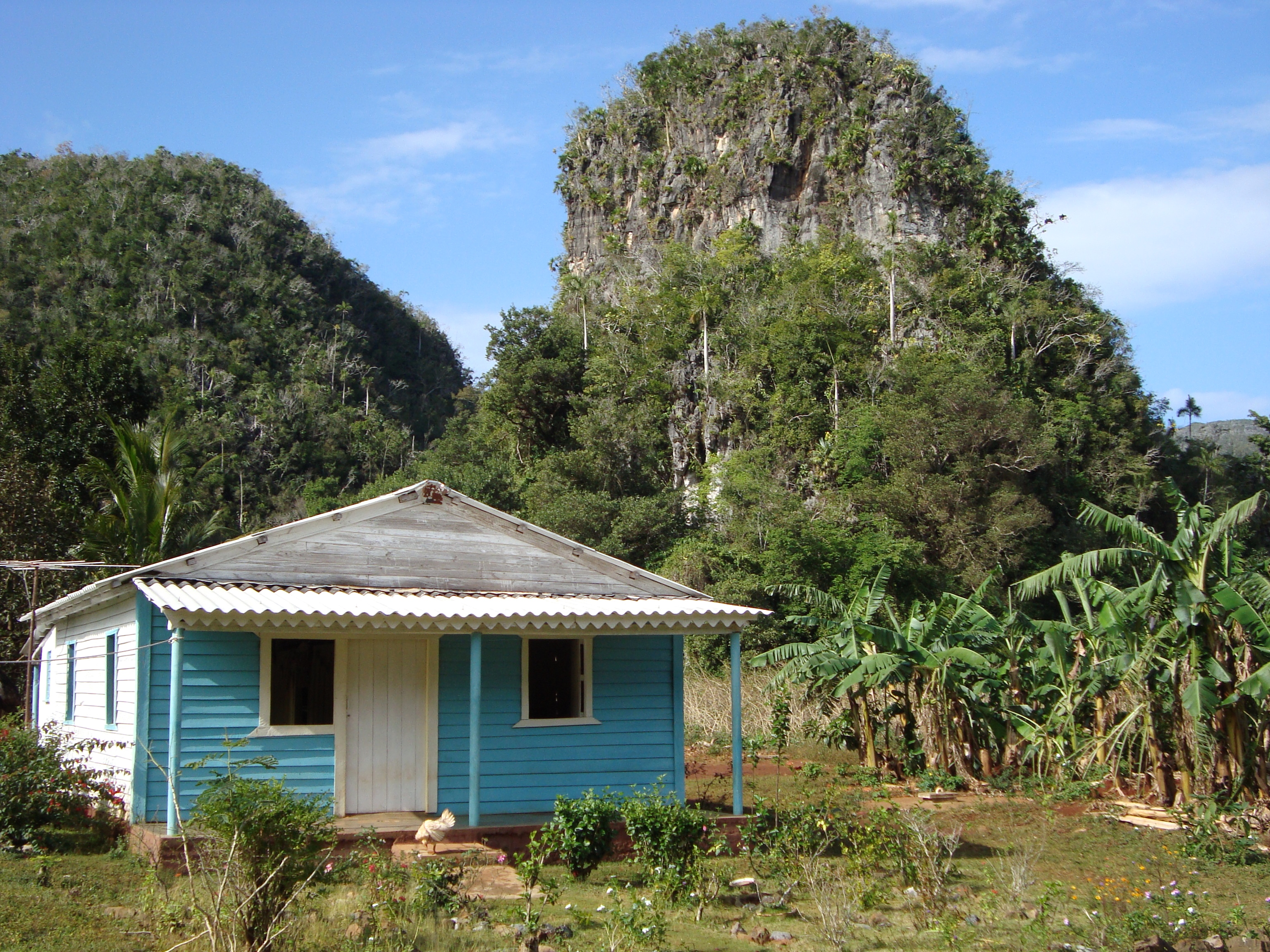
Viñales Countryside

== See also ==
- Topes de Collantes
