= San Diego River (Cuba) =

Location
- Country: Cuba

San Diego River is a river of southern Cuba.

== See also ==
- List of rivers of Cuba
