= Autopista Havana–Mariel =

Motorway in Cuba

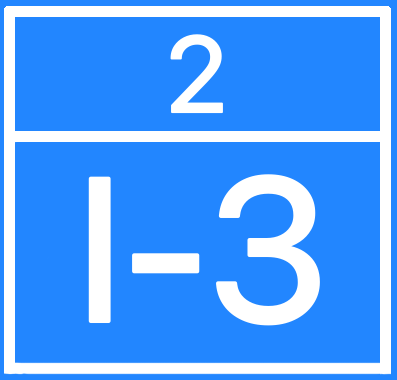
Autopista La Habana–Mariel (Carretera Panamericana)
- 2–I–3
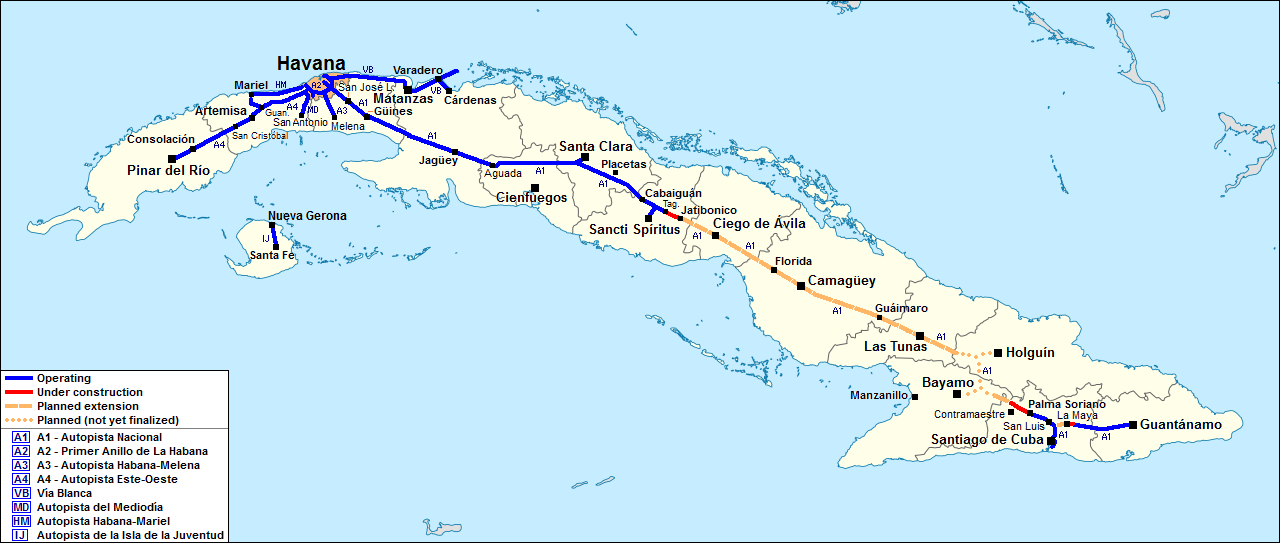
- Map of the Cuban motorway network

Route information
- Length: 26 km (16 mi)

Major junctions
- East end: Havana
- West end: Mariel

Location
- Country: Cuba
- Major cities: Havana, Playa Baracoa, Mariel

Highway system
- Roads in Cuba

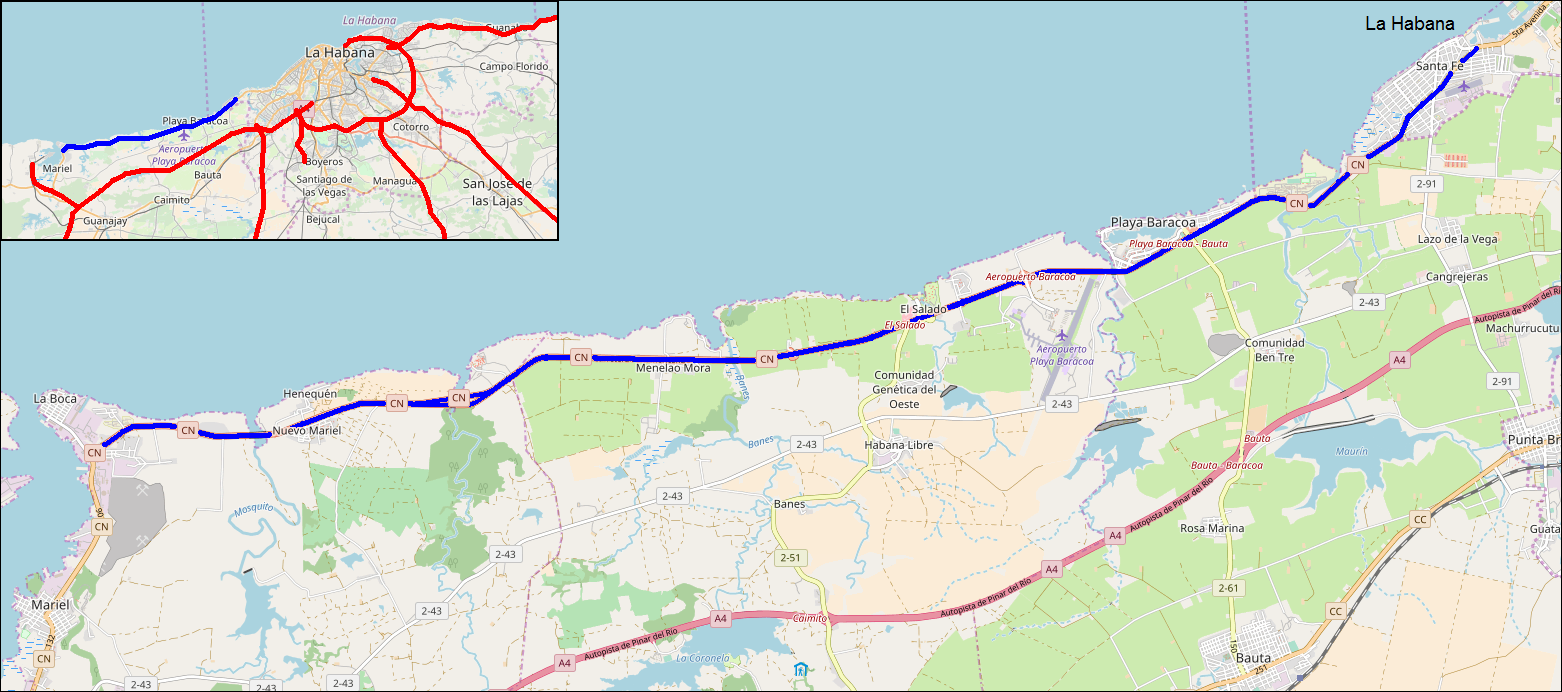
OSM map of the motorway (highlighted in blue) within the suburban western area of Havana. In the corner map the autopista is shown (blue) within the Havana motorway network (red)

The Autopista Havana–Mariel, also known as Carretera Panamericana, is a Cuban motorway linking Havana to Mariel. It is a toll-free road and has a length of 26 km (16 mi). Even though it is a motorway (autopista), it is part of the national highway Circuito Norte (CN).

== Route ==
The highway is a dual carriageway with 4 lanes and has some at-grade intersections with rural roads. Differently from other Cuban motorways in Cuban mainland, the Panamericana is the only one not directly linked to the network.

The autopista starts in Santa Fe, a suburban ward of western Havana, and continues through Artemisa Province, by the Atlantic Coastline. It crosses the municipal territories of Bauta, Caimito, and ends north of Mariel, near La Boca, in front of Mariel Bay.

The road that continues towards south, the "Circuito Norte", reaches Mariel after 3 km (1.9 mi) and, after 6 km (3.7 mi), the A4 exit "Mariel-Nodarse", on the "ZEDM beltway" (Port of Mariel-Guanajay). This beltway, together with the A4 main route Guanajay-Havana, represents an alternative motorway road to the Panamericana, between Mariel and the Cuban capital.

AUTOPISTA HAVANA–MARIEL (Carretera Panamericana)
Exit	↓km↓	Province	Note
Habana ELAM	4.5	Havana	
Playa Baracoa (to Bauta and A4 motorway)	6.4	Artemisa	
Playa Baracoa Aeropuerto	9.5	Artemisa	
Roberto Negrín	10.6	Artemisa	
El Salado-Habana Libre (to Caimito and Genético del Oeste)	11.4	Artemisa	
Menelao Mora	16.1	Artemisa	
Boca Guajaibón	18.9	Artemisa	
Nuevo Mariel-Henequén	22.6	Artemisa	
Santa Barbara	24.1	Artemisa	
Mujica	25.7	Artemisa	
Mariel-La Boca (road to Mariel town center and A4 motorway)	26.5	Artemisa	

== See also ==
- Infrastructure of Cuba
- Roads in Cuba
- Transport in Cuba
