= Playa Baracoa =

- Village
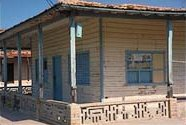
- A typical wooden house of Playa Baracoa

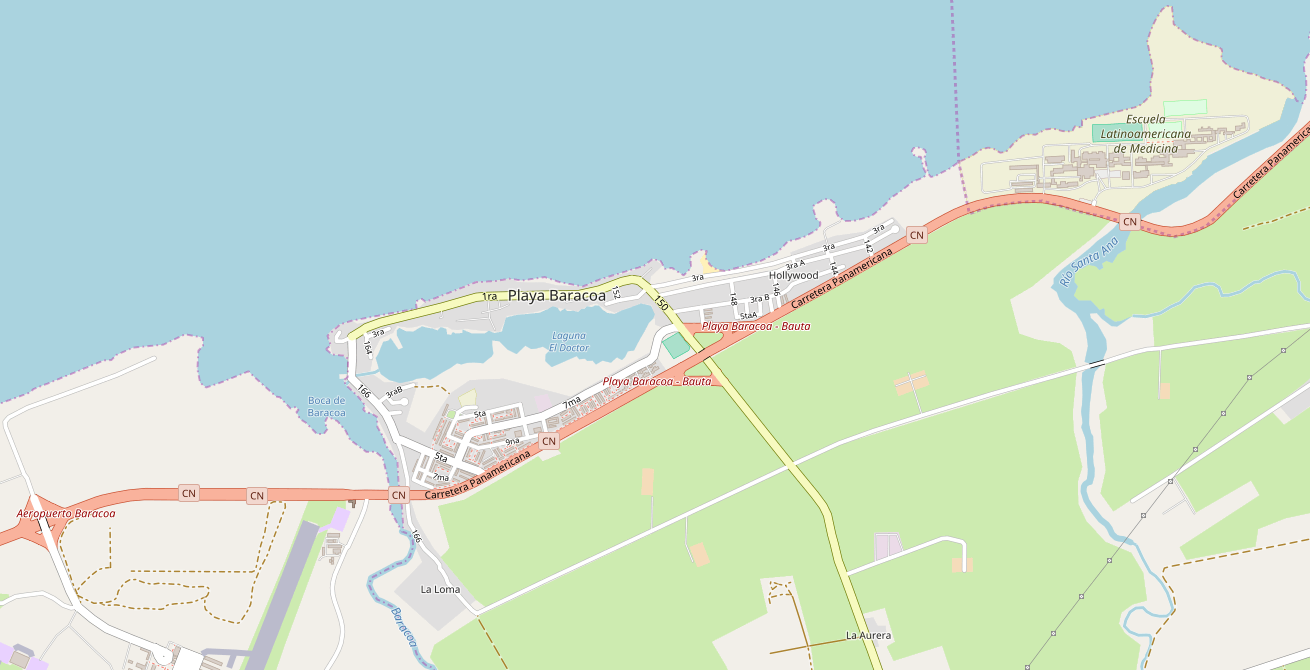
- OSM map showing Playa Baracoa. Locations of the airport (lower left) and the ELAM (upper right) arw shown in it

- Location of Playa Baracoa in Cuba
- Coordinates: 23°03′02.3″N 82°33′35.0″W
- Country: Cuba
- Province: Artemisa
- Municipality: Bauta
- Founded: 1862
- Elevation: 5 m (16 ft)

Population (2011)
  - Total: 7,000 (about)
- Time zone: UTC-5 (EST)
- Area code: +53-47

Playa Baracoa, sometimes shortened as Baracoa, is a Cuban village and consejo popular ("people's council", i.e. hamlet) of the municipality of Bauta, in Artemisa Province. In 2011 it had a population of about 7,000.

== History ==
The village was founded in 1862 on a sugar cane mill, named San Cristóbal de Baracoa, established in the 18th century. Between 1930 and 1940, some members of the upper class from the nearby city of Havana, built their summer houses in the village. Many of these wooden houses are still standing, and some of them are still used as summer residences.

== Geography ==
Part of the Havana metropolitan area, and directly bordering with Santa Fe (a ward of the Havana's municipal borough of Playa); Playa Baracoa lies by the Atlantic Coast, Gulf of Mexico, along the Straits of Florida. The main campus of the Latin American School of Medicine (ELAM), located in Santa Fe, is lesser than 500 m far from it.

The village spans, from east to west, between the river mouths of Santa Ana (towards Havana) and Baracoa (towards Caimito municipal borders). It grows around a lagoon named Laguna El Doctor, and is divided into the quarters of Cinco Casitas, Hollywood, La Loma and Los Cocos.

Playa Baracoa is 4 km from El Salado, 8 from Bauta, 16 from Caimito, 23 from Mariel, 24 from San Antonio de los Baños, 25 from Guanajay, 30 from Havana city center and 61 from Artemisa.

== Transport ==
Playa Baracoa Airport (IATA: UPB) serves Havana and is located west of the village, after the bridge over Baracoa River. Anyway, the structure belongs to the neighboring municipal territory of Caimito.

Concerning road transport, Playa Baracoa is crossed in the middle by the Havana–Mariel motorway, part of the state highway "Circuito Norte" (CN); and is the northern end of the provincial road 2–61 to Bauta. The exit "Bauta", on the A4 motorway, is 3.8 km south of the village.

== See also ==
- Municipalities of Cuba
- List of cities in Cuba
