= La Habana Province (1976–2010) =

- Province
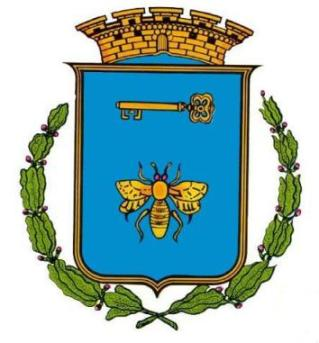
- Flag Coat of arms

- Location of Havana Province in Cuba
- Country: Cuba
- Capital: Havana
- Municipalities: Artemisa, Mariel, Guanajay, Caimito, Bauta, San Antonio de los Baños, Bejucal, San José de las Lajas, Jaruco, Santa Cruz del Norte, Madruga, Nueva Paz, Güines, Melena del Sur, Quivicán, Alquízar, Batabanó, Cuba, Güira de Melena, San Nicolás de Bari

Area
  - Total: 5,731.59 km^{2} (2,212.98 sq mi)

Population (2004)
  - Total: 722,045
  - Density: 125.976/km^{2} (326.277/sq mi)
- Time zone: UTC-5 (EST)
- Area code: +53-07

Havana Province (Spanish: Provincia La Habana) was one of the provinces of Cuba from 1976, when the nation's provincial structure was revised, through the end of 2010. On January 1, 2011, the province was divided into two new provinces, Artemisa and Mayabeque. La Habana Province had 711,066 people in the 2002 census. The largest city was Artemisa (81,209), as the much larger city of Havana was structured in a different province, Ciudad de La Habana Province.

== Geography ==
La Habana Province bordered Pinar del Río, and Matanzas. It had coasts in the south and north and had dozens of towns and a few small cities which rank between the 20 and 40 largest of the island.

== Economy ==
Much of the province's agriculture was geared towards the production of food, primarily cattle, potatoes and fruit. Unlike much of Cuba, sugar and tobacco played only a small role in the province's economy. There was also much industrialization in the province, with numerous electricity plants and sugar mills.

== Municipalities ==
Municipality	Population (2004)	Area (km²)	Location	Remarks
Alquizar	29,616	193	22.80667°N 82.58278°W	
Artemisa	81,209	690	22.81361°N 82.76333°W	
Batabanó	25,664	187	22.72472°N 82.28972°W	
Bauta	45,509	157	22.99194°N 82.54917°W	
Bejucal	25,425	120	22.93278°N 82.38694°W	
Caimito	36,813	238	22.95778°N 82.59639°W	
Guanajay	28,429	113	22.93056°N 82.68778°W	
Güines	68,951	445	22.84778°N 82.02361°W	
Güira de Melena	37,838	178	22.80222°N 82.50472°W	
Jaruco	25,658	276	23.04278°N 82.00917°W	
Madruga	30,640	464	22.91639°N 81.85694°W	
Mariel	42,504	269	22.99389°N 82.75389°W	
Melena del Sur	20,445	227	22.78167°N 82.14833°W	
Nueva Paz	24,277	515	22.76333°N 81.75806°W	
Quivicán	29,253	283	22.82472°N 82.35583°W	
San Antonio de los Baños	46,300	127	22.88889°N 82.49861°W	
San José de las Lajas	69,375	591	22.96806°N 82.15583°W	
San Nicolás	21,563	242	22.78194°N 81.90667°W	
Santa Cruz del Norte	32,576	376	23.15583°N 81.92639°W	

Sources: Population from 2004 Census; Area from 1976 municipal re-adjustment

== Demographics ==
In 2004, the province of La Habana had a population of 722,045. With a total area of 5,731.59 km^{2} (2,212.98 sq mi), the province had a population density of 126.0/km^{2} (326/sq mi).
