= Cabañas, Cuba =

Cabañas
- Village
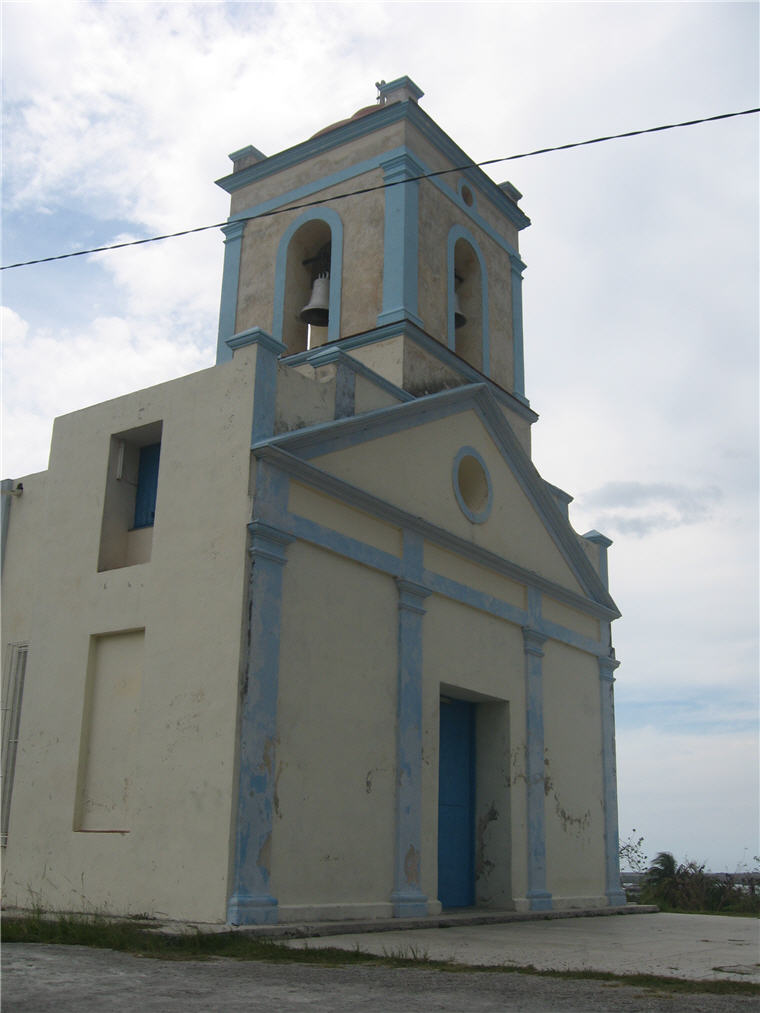
- The church of Cabañas

- Location of Cabañas in Cuba
- Coordinates: 22°58′39.72″N 82°55′20.78″W
- Country: Cuba
- Province: Artemisa
- Municipality: Mariel
- Time zone: UTC-5 (EST)
- Area code: +53-7

Cabañas is a village and consejo popular of the municipality of Mariel, in the Artemisa Province, on the northeast coast in western Cuba.

== History ==
Prior to 1970 was a municipality of Pinar del Río Province. Cabañas bay is a harbor with industrial and fishing facilities, with an important base of the Cuban Navy.

From November to December 1958, the town was the site of a massacre by anti-communist forces during the Cuban Revolution. Authorities began by killing two farmers who they thought were connected to an earlier guerilla attack on Government bases. The soldiers are reported to have killed dozens of suspected communists and witnesses until December. The Havana Times recorded the names of twelve people who died during the massacre.

== Geography ==
Located in the western corner of the Cabañas Bay, by the Atlantic Ocean, Cabañas lies between Mariel (21 km or 13 mi west) and Bahía Honda (30 km or 19 mi east), and is crossed in the middle by the state highway "Circuito Norte" (CN). It is 26 km (16 mi) from Guanajay, 34 km (21 mi) from Artemisa and 67 km (42 mi) from Havana city center.

== See also ==
- Municipalities of Cuba
- List of cities in Cuba
