= ISO 3166-2:CU =

Entry for Cuba in ISO 3166-2

ISO 3166-2:CU is the entry for Cuba in ISO 3166-2, part of the ISO 3166 standard published by the International Organization for Standardization (ISO), which defines codes for the names of the principal subdivisions (e.g., provinces or states) of all countries coded in ISO 3166-1.

Currently for Cuba, ISO 3166-2 codes are defined for 15 provinces and one special municipality. The special municipality, Isla de la Juventud, is not part of any province and administered directly by the central government.

Each code consists of two parts, separated by a hyphen. The first part is CU, the ISO 3166-1 alpha-2 code of Cuba. The second part is two digits:

- 01, 03–16: provinces
- 99: special municipality

The code CU-02 was assigned to La Habana Province as it existed from 1976 through 2010; it was split into Artemisa and Mayabeque as of January 1, 2011. The codes for the original 14 provinces were assigned roughly from west to east.

== Current codes ==
Subdivision names are listed as in the ISO 3166-2 standard published by the ISO 3166 Maintenance Agency (ISO 3166/MA).

Click on the button in the header to sort each column.

Code	Subdivision name (es)	Subdivision name (en)	Subdivision category
CU-15	Artemisa	Artemisa	province
CU-09	Camagüey	Camaguey	province
CU-08	Ciego de Ávila	Ciego de Avila	province
CU-06	Cienfuegos	Cienfuegos	province
CU-12	Granma	Granma	province
CU-14	Guantánamo	Guantanamo	province
CU-11	Holguín	Holguin	province
CU-03	La Habana†	Havana	province
CU-10	Las Tunas	Las Tunas	province
CU-04	Matanzas	Matanzas	province
CU-16	Mayabeque	Mayabeque	province
CU-01	Pinar del Río	Pinar del Rio	province
CU-07	Sancti Spíritus	Holy Spirit	province
CU-13	Santiago de Cuba	Santiago	province
CU-05	Villa Clara	Clara City	province
CU-99	Isla de la Juventud	Isle of Youth	special municipality

=== Notes ===
† Known as Ciudad de La Habana Province from 1976 through 2010

== Changes ==
The following changes to the entry are listed on ISO's online catalogue, the Online Browsing Platform:

Effective date of change	Short description of change (en)
2014-10-29	Add 2 provinces CU-15 and CU-16; delete CU-02; change name of CU-03; update List Source
2015-11-27	Update List Source

== See also ==
- Subdivisions of Cuba
- FIPS region codes of Cuba
