= Caimito, Cuba =

Caimito
- Municipality
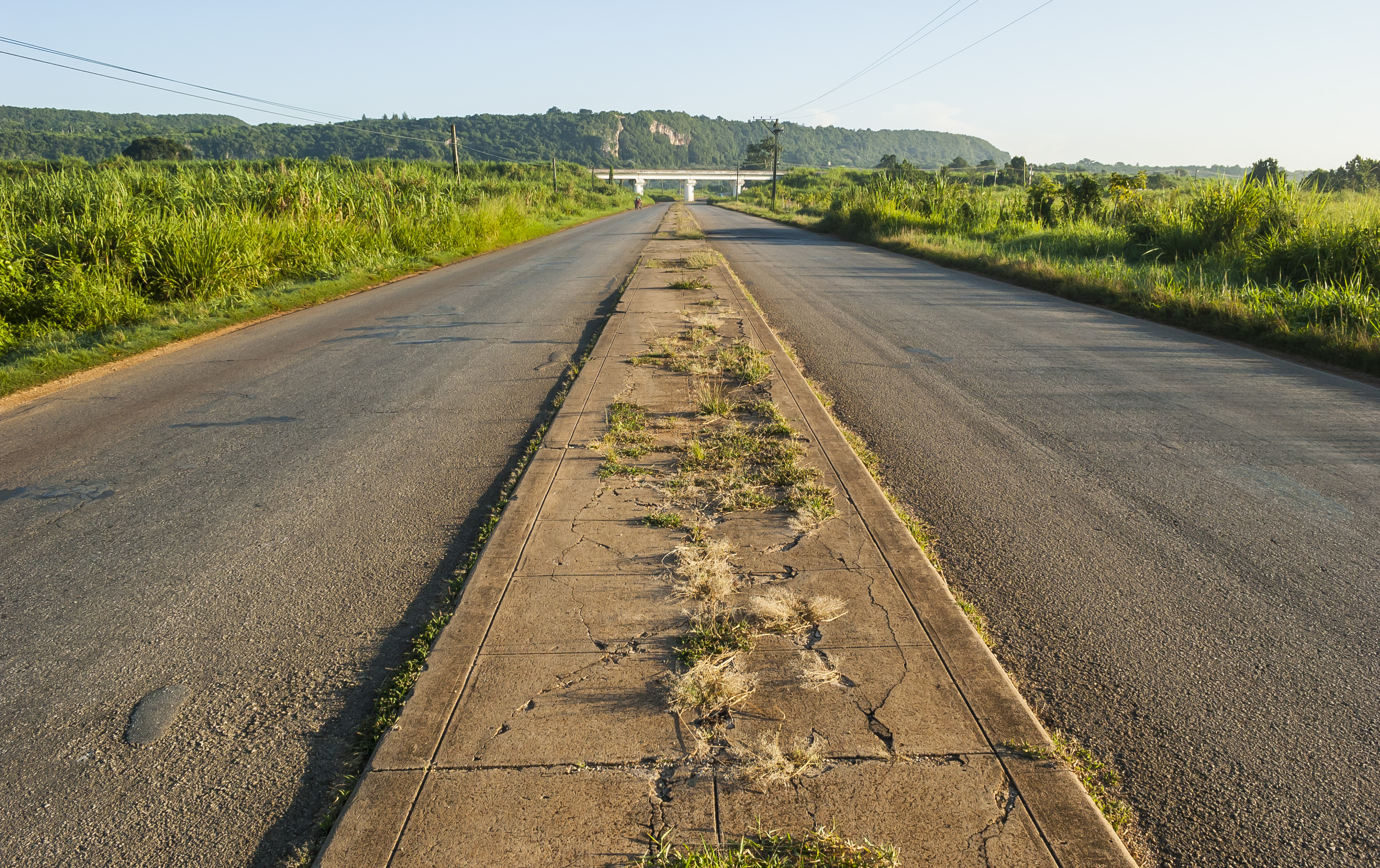
- The road to Guayabal outside Caimito

- Flag Coat of arms Emblem

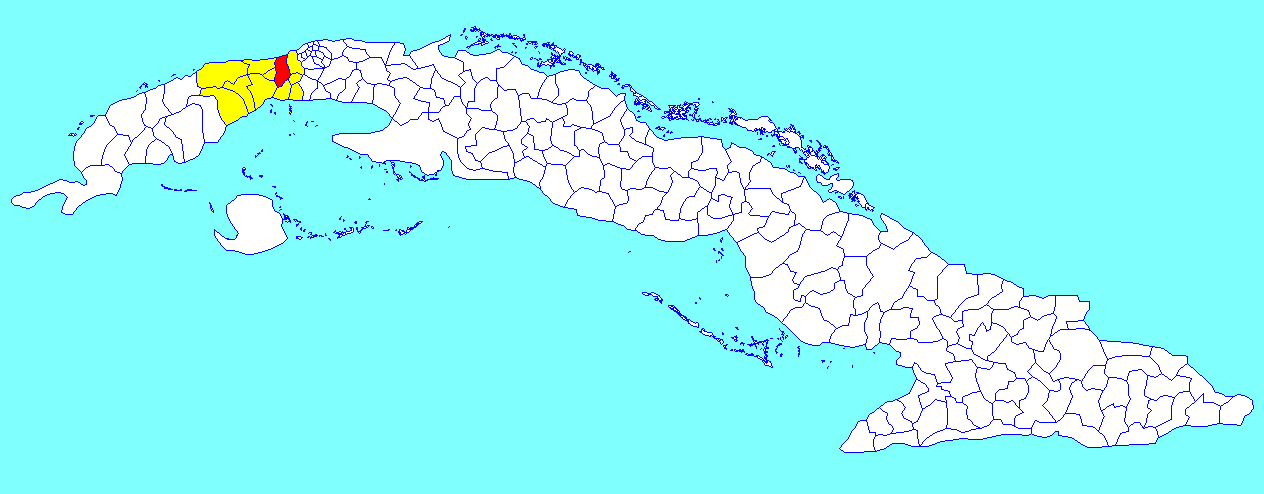
- Caimito municipality (red) within Artemisa Province (yellow) and Cuba
- Coordinates: 22°57′27″N 82°35′47″W
- Country: Cuba
- Province: Artemisa
- Founded: 1910

Area
  - Total: 238 km^{2} (92 sq mi)
- Elevation: 95 m (312 ft)

Population (2022)
  - Total: 42,552
  - Density: 179/km^{2} (463/sq mi)
- Time zone: UTC-5 (EST)
- Area code: +53-7
- Climate: Am

Caimito is a municipality and town in Artemisa Province of Cuba. The town was founded in 1820. The municipality of Caimito del Guayabal was created in 1910, based on the previously existing (1879–1902) municipality of Guayabal in the Pinar del Río Province. Since 1976, the official name is Caimito.

== Geography ==
The municipality is divided into the villages of Caimito, Guayabal, Ceiba del Agua, Pueblo Nuevo, Rancho Grande, Capellanías, Vereda Nueva, Los Naranjos, Aguacate, Banes, Habana Libre and Menelao Mora.

== Demographics ==
In 2022, the municipality of Caimito had a population of 42,552. With a total area of 238 km^{2} (92 sq mi), it has a population density of 180/km^{2} (470/sq mi).

== Transport ==
Caimito, crossed by the Carretera Central, is served by A4 motorway, passing some km north. From 2014, it counts a railway station on the new Havana-Guanajay-Artemisa/Mariel line, part of the Havana-Artemisa-Pinar del Río line. Playa Baracoa Airport, serving Havana, is located in the municipal territory, and lies in front of Playa Baracoa, a village belonging to the neighboring municipality of Bauta.

== See also ==
- Municipalities of Cuba
- List of cities in Cuba
