= Abraham Lincoln, Cuba =

Ward in Artemisa, Cuba

Lincoln Andorra
- Ward and Urban settlement
- Abraham Lincoln
- Location within Cuba
- Coordinates: 22°48′0.0″N 82°47′50.4″W
- Country: Cuba
- Province: Artemisa
- Municipality: Artemisa
- Named for: Abraham Lincoln

Area
  - Total: 0.69 km^{2} (0.27 sq mi)

Population (2012)
  - Total: 1,434
  - Density: 2,100/km^{2} (5,400/sq mi)

Abraham Lincoln, simply known as Lincoln, is a ward and an urban settlement in Artemisa, Cuba. The settlement is named after the 16th president of the United States, Abraham Lincoln. It is located 4 kilometers away from the provincial capital of Artemisa, and 78 kilometers from the capital of Cuba, Havana.

== History ==
Lincoln was formerly part of the barrio of Pijirigua, in the same municipality of Artemisa.

=== Lincoln Sugar Mill ===
The settlement, and the sugar mill with the same name, was originally named Lincoln in 1917, and the name was later changed to Andorra, and finally Abraham Lincoln, in 1920. It was completed by the Manuel Galdo y Compañía.

Currently, the sugar mill contains only a few structures, including two chimneys, which are all currently abandoned, after the mill closed in 2009, due to the Tarea Alvaro Reynoso.

== Education ==
Lincoln has the Julio Diaz Gonzalez University of Artemisa, and a junior high school that was originally the distillery of the town.

== Demographics ==
The urban settlement of Lincoln had a population of 2,153 in 1981, 1,532 in 2002, and a population of 1,434 in 2012, decreasing each census year.
