= Santa Fe, Havana =

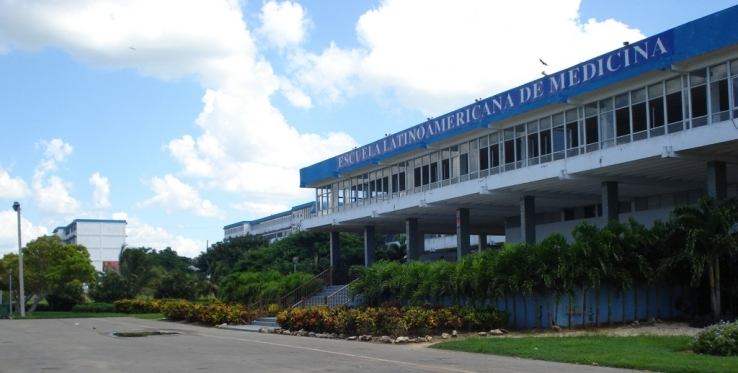
- ELAM's main building

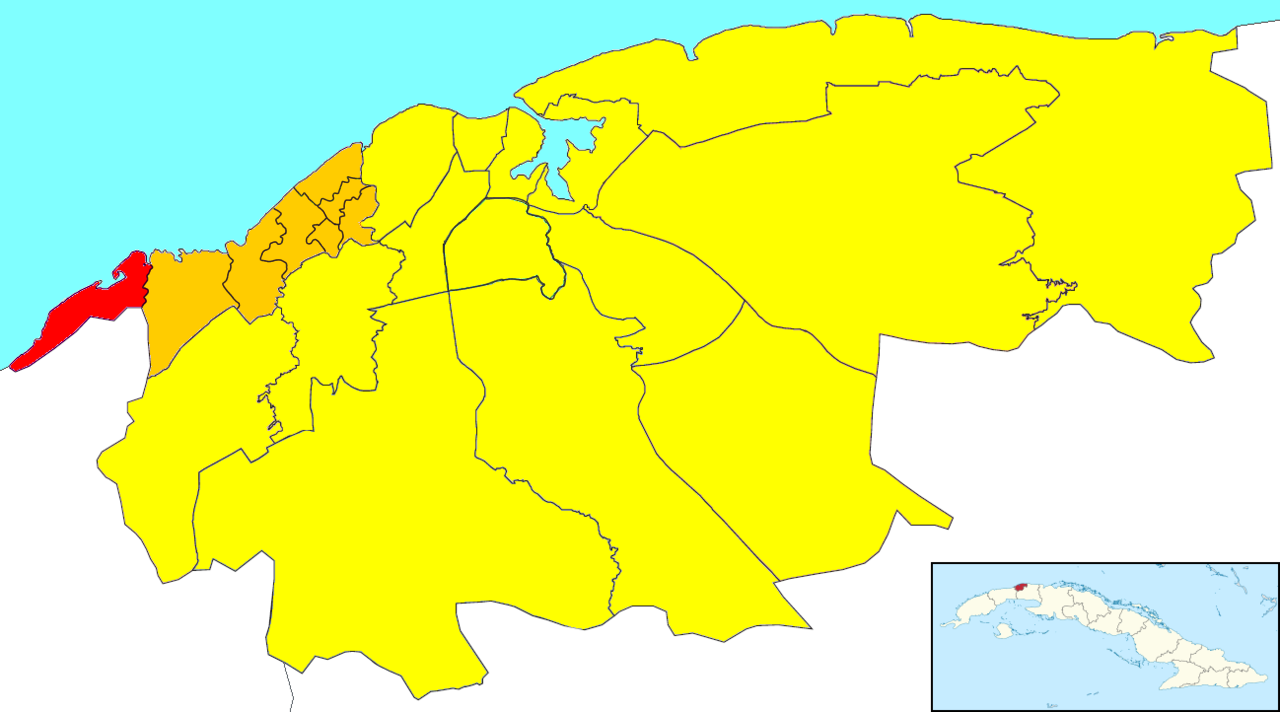
- Country: Cuba
- Province: La Habana
- Municipality: Playa

Santa Fe is a ward (consejo popular) in the municipality of Playa in Havana, Cuba.

== Geography ==
It is bordered on the north by the Florida Strait, on the east by Jaimanitas, a former fishing village, on the west by Playa Baracoa, and on the south by Bauta in Artemisa Province.

== Landmarks ==
- ELAM (Latin American School of Medicine) Cuba
