= Bauta, Cuba =

Bauta
- Municipality
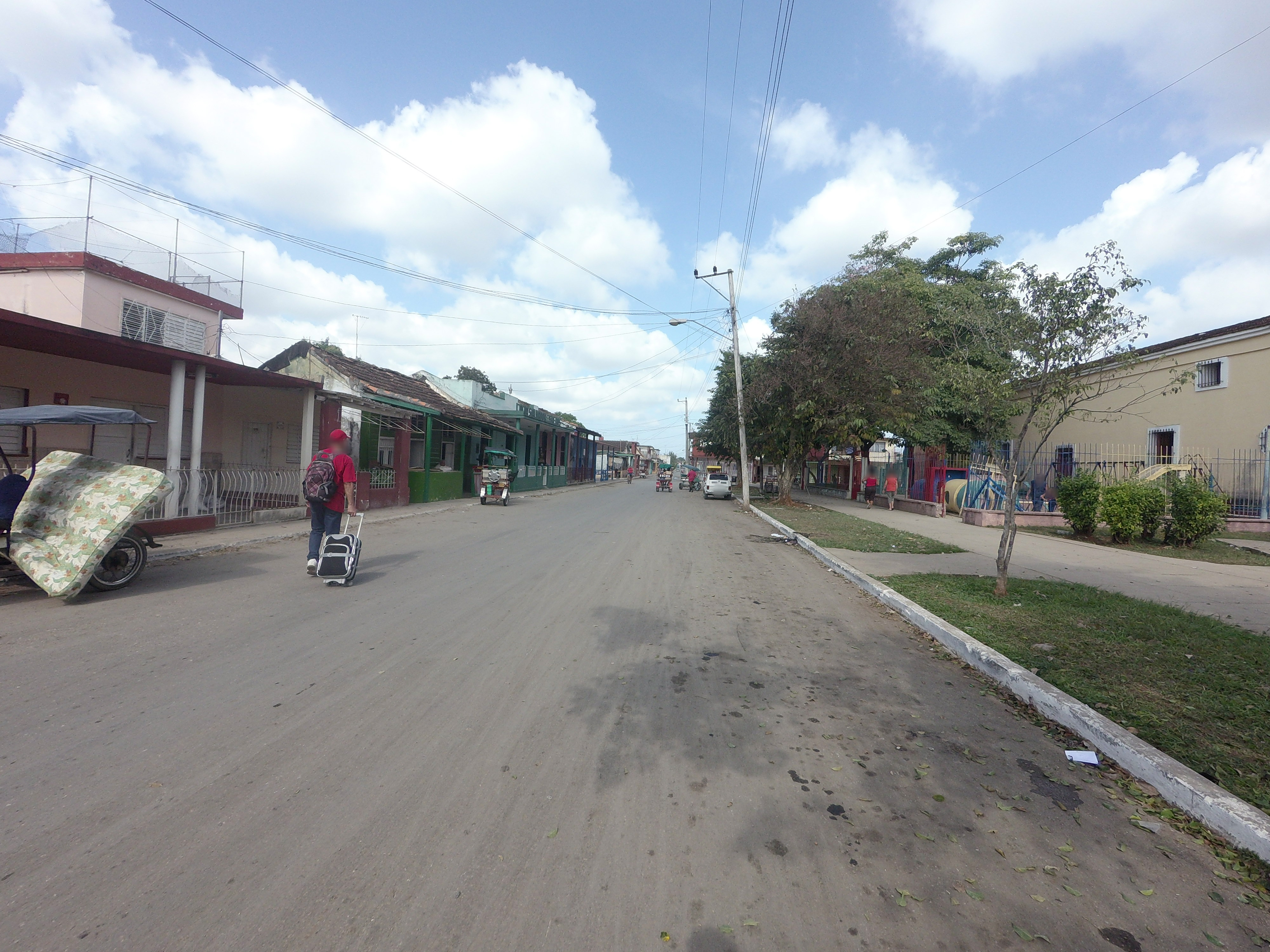
- Calle 152 in Bauta

- Coat of arms

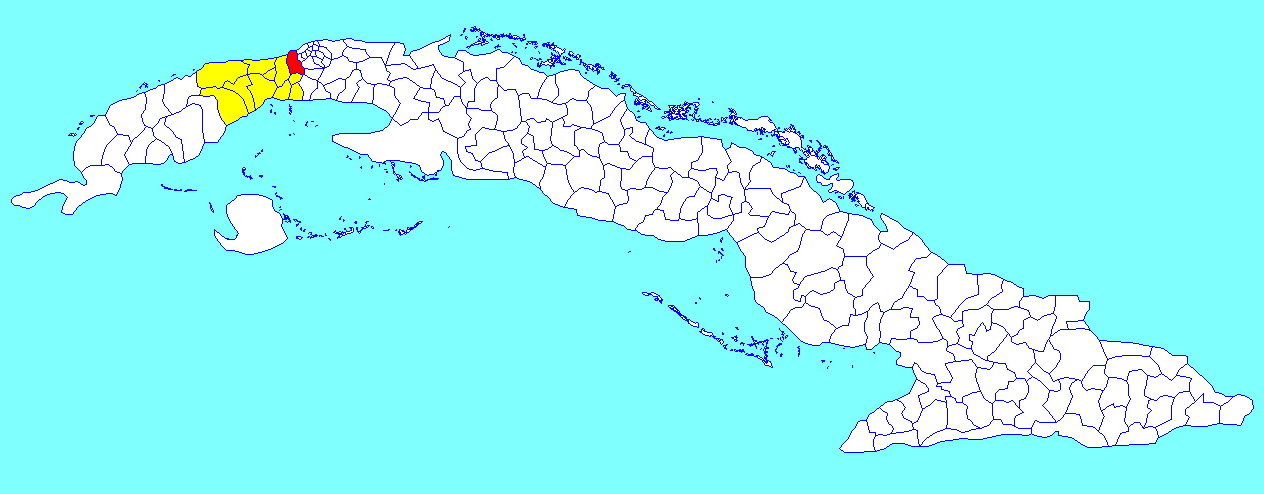
- Bauta municipality (red) within Artemisa Province (yellow) and Cuba
- Coordinates: 22°59′31″N 82°32′57″W
- Country: Cuba
- Province: Artemisa
- Founded: January 14, 1879

Area
  - Total: 157 km^{2} (61 sq mi)
- Elevation: 75 m (246 ft)

Population (2022)
  - Total: 51,300
  - Density: 327/km^{2} (846/sq mi)
- Time zone: UTC-5 (EST)
- Area code: +53-47
- Climate: Am

Bauta is a municipality and town located 40 km (25 mi) southwest of Havana City, in the Artemisa Province of Cuba since 2010 as a result of the division of what was the Province of Havana (Havana Countryside).

== Geography ==
Part of the Havana metropolitan area, the municipality includes the villages of Anafe, Cangrejeras, Cayo La Rosa, Comunidad Ben Tre, Corralillo (Félix E. Alpízar), Lazo de la Vega, Machurrucutu, Playa Baracoa, Pueblo Textil (Ariguanabo), Rosa Marina and San Pedro (General Antonio Maceo). Baracoa River crosses the municipality, and Playa Baracoa is established at its mouth at the Gulf of Mexico.

== Demographics ==
In 2022, the municipality of Bauta had a population of 51,300. With a total area of 157 km^{2} (61 sq mi), it has a population density of 330/km^{2} (850/sq mi).

== Economy ==
Bauta is a regional trading center for the local farm community. Regional crops include sugarcane, pineapple, tobacco, root vegetables, and citrus fruits. In recent years Bauta has become a haven for Cuban artists and musicians.

== Transport ==
Bauta, crossed by the Carretera Central, is served by A4 motorway, passing some km north. From 2014, it counts a railway station on the new Havana-Guanajay-Artemisa/Mariel line, part of the Havana-Artemisa-Pinar del Río line. Playa Baracoa Airport, serving Havana, is located in the neighboring municipal territory of Caimito, but lies in front of the village of Playa Baracoa.

== See also ==
- Municipalities of Cuba
- List of cities in Cuba
- Bauta Municipal Museum
