= LASM =

LASM may refer to:

- Latin American School of Medicine, Cuba
- Light Anti-Structure Missile, a version of the M72 LAW used by UK Armed Forces
- Land Attack Standard Missile (RGM-165/SM4 designation) a program where USN tried to imply a new standard of a naval missile for a land-attack support, - a RIM-66 Standard SM-2MR derivative.
