= List of Cuban provinces by Human Development Index =

Human Development Index for Cuba

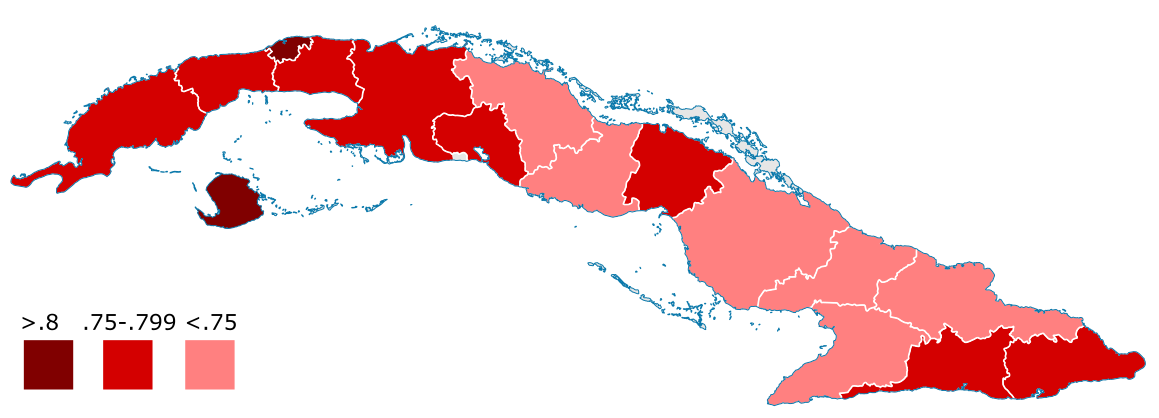
Map of the provinces and territories of Cuba by HDI in 2021

This is a list of provinces of Cuba by Human Development Index as of 2023 with data for the year 2022.

Rank	Province	HDI (2023)
Very high human development
1	La Habana	▼0.800
High human development
2	Isla de la Juventud	▼0.782
3	Cienfuegos	▲0.771
4	Artemisa and Mayabeque	▼0.770
4	Guantánamo	▲0.769
6	Ciego de Ávila	▲0.767
6	Santiago de Cuba	▲0.767
–	Cuba (average)	▼0.762
8	Matanzas	▼0.759
9	Pinar del Río	▼0.752
10	Villa Clara	▲0.750
11	Camagüey	▲0.747
12	Holguín	▲0.745
12	Sancti Spíritus	▲0.745
14	Las Tunas	▲0.738
15	Granma	▼0.736
