= Bauta =

Bauta may refer to:

- Bauta, Cuba, a city and municipality
- The bauta mask, a mask traditionally worn for the Carnival of Venice
- Bauta (stone), a large upright standing stone
