= Bahía Honda Municipal Museum =

Museum in Cuba, established on the 23rd of June 1983

- Museo Municipal de Bahía Honda
- Established: 23 June 1983
- Location: Bahía Honda, Cuba

Bahía Honda Municipal Museum is a museum located in the 23rd avenue in Bahía Honda, Cuba. It was established as a museum on 23 June 1983.

The museum holds collections on history, weaponry, ethnology, numismatics and archeology.

== See also ==
- List of museums in Cuba
