= Bahía Honda, Cuba =

Bahía Honda
- Municipality
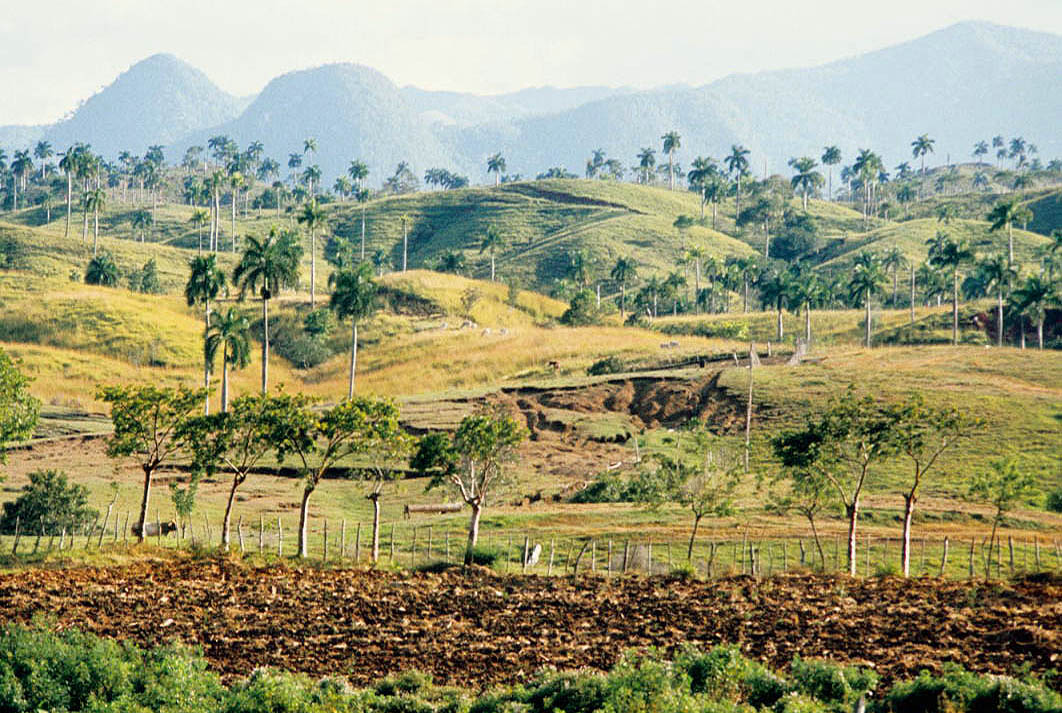
- Bahía Honda, Pinar del Río (1983)

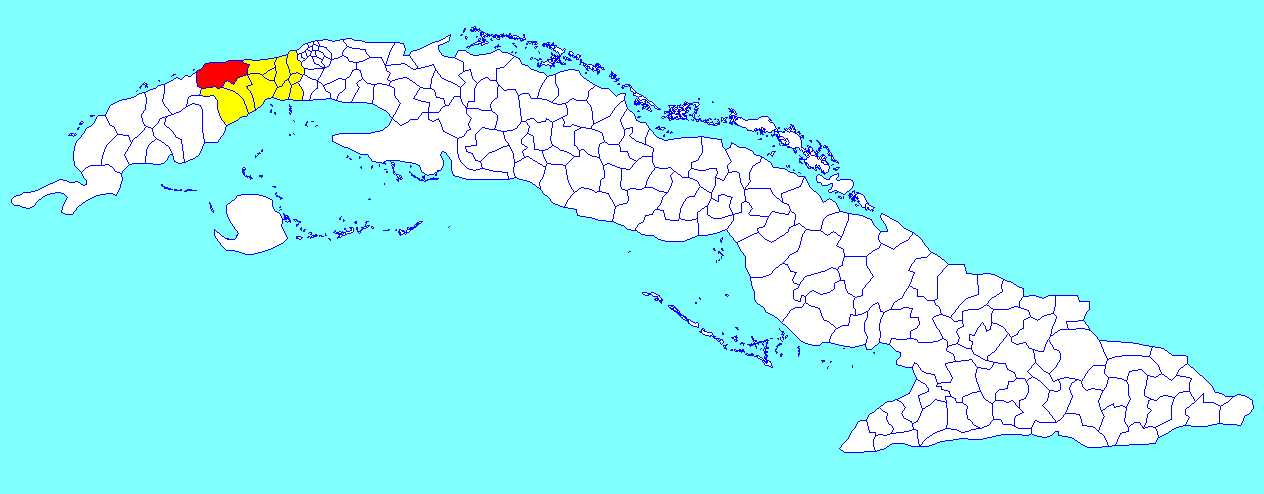
- Bahía Honda municipality (red) within Artemisa Province (yellow) and Cuba
- Coordinates: 22°54′23″N 83°09′50″W
- Country: Cuba
- Province: Artemisa

Area
  - Total: 784 km^{2} (303 sq mi)
- Elevation: 25 m (82 ft)

Population (2022)
  - Total: 42,522
  - Density: 54.2/km^{2} (140/sq mi)
- Time zone: UTC-5 (EST)
- Area code: +53-82
- Climate: Af

Bahía Honda is a municipality and town in the Artemisa Province of Cuba. Before 2011, the municipality belonged to Pinar del Río Province.

== Overview ==
It is located on the northern shore of the island, in an inlet of the Florida Straits, 70 km (43 mi) west of Havana. The sheltered bay that gives the name to the municipality contains an industrial port. It marks the eastern extend of the Colorados Archipelago.

Bahía Honda was once one of the naval bases leased to the United States under the Platt Amendment, but abandoned in 1912 in turn for an expansion of the area leased around Guantánamo Bay.

== Demographics ==
In 2022, the municipality of Bahía Honda had a population of 42,522. With a total area of 784 km^{2} (303 sq mi), it has a population density of 54/km^{2} (140/sq mi).

== Climate ==
This area typically has a pronounced dry season, but average monthly precipitation does not get lower than 68 mm (in March) in Bahía Honda, making this a more humid locality than many others in the region. According to the Köppen Climate Classification system, Bahía Honda, Cuba has a tropical rainforest climate, abbreviated "Af" on climate maps.

== See also ==
- Municipalities of Cuba
- List of cities in Cuba
- Bahía Honda Municipal Museum
