= Artemisa Municipal Museum =

Museum in Artemisa, Cuba

- Museo Municipal de Artemisa
- Established: 28 January 1982
- Location: Artemisa, Cuba

Artemisa Municipal Museum is a museum located in the Martí street in Artemisa, Cuba. It was established as museum on 28 January 1982.

The museum holds collections on history and weaponry.

== See also ==
- List of museums in Cuba
