= Playa Baracoa Airport =

Airport in Caimito, Cuba

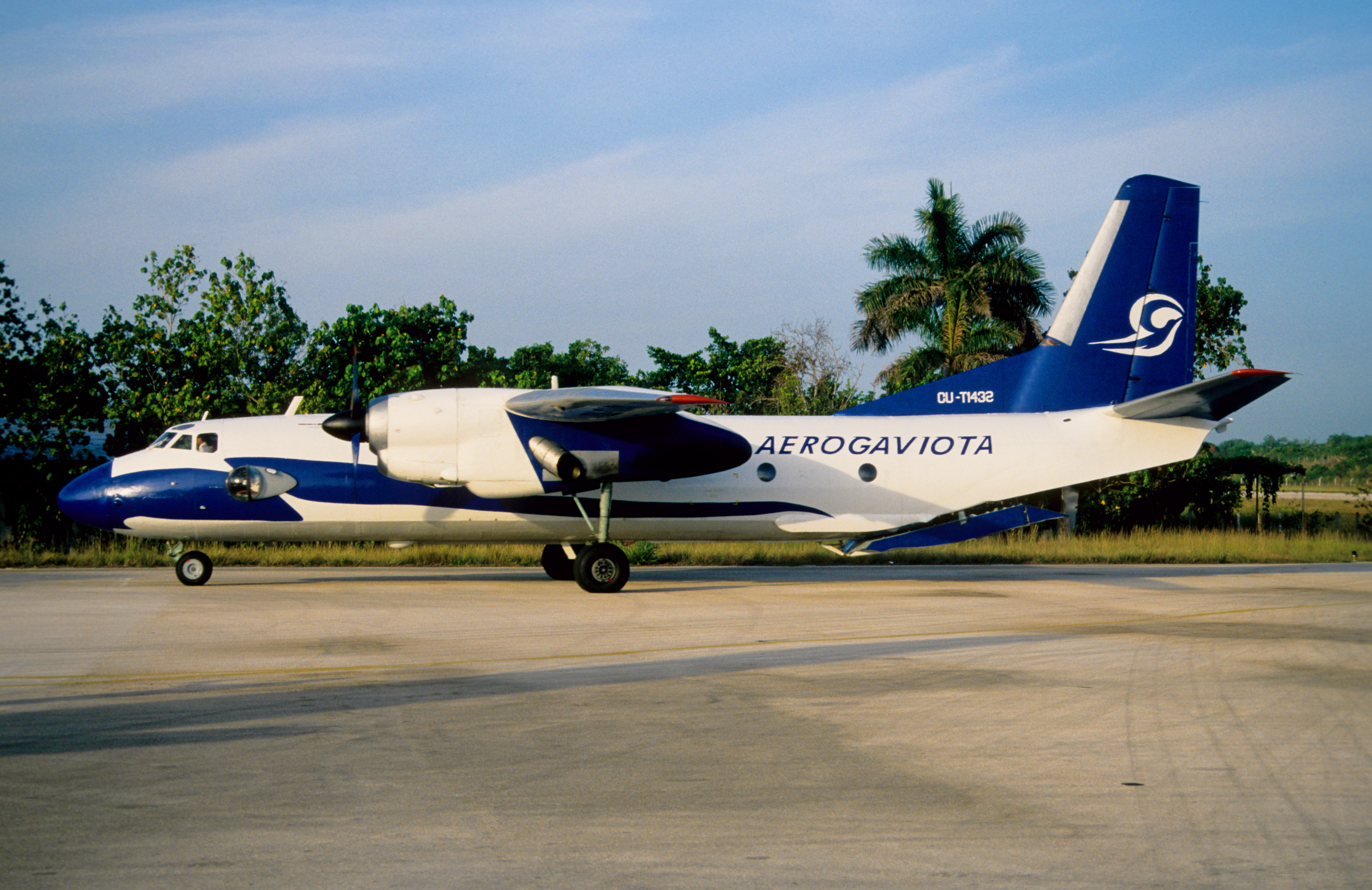
- An Antonov An-26 of Aerogaviota departing from Playa Baracoa
- IATA: UPB; ICAO: MUPB

Summary
- Airport type: Military/Public
- Serves: Havana
- Elevation AMSL: 31 m / 102 ft
- Coordinates: 23°01′58″N 082°34′46″W

Map
- Location in Cuba

Runways
Direction	Length		Surface
Direction	m	ft	Surface
03/21	2,305	7,562	Asphalt
- Source: Aerodrome chart

Playa Baracoa Airport (IATA: UPB, ICAO: MUPB) is an airport west of Havana, Cuba. It is located in the municipality of Caimito, Artemisa Province, in front of the village of Playa Baracoa, belonging to the neighboring municipality of Bauta.

== Playa Baracoa Air Base ==
The airport is an inactive Cuban Revolutionary Armed Forces air base and home to Air Defense Command and VIP transport:

- 3710th Interceptor Squadron and Training
- 3688 Transport Regiment - using Antonov An-26 transport
- 3405 Executive Transport Squadron - Yakovlev Yak-40 VIP jet, Antonov An-26M transport; Mil Mi-8P and Mil Mi-8TB transport helicopters
- 3404 Transport Squadron - using Antonov An-2 transport
