= Bauta Municipal Museum =

Museum in Cuba

- Museo Municipal de Bauta
- Established: 3 May 1981
- Location: Bauta, Cuba

Bauta Municipal Museum is a museum located in the 251st avenue in Bauta, Cuba. It was established as a museum on 3 May 1981.

The museum holds collections on history and decorative arts.

== See also ==
- List of museums in Cuba
