= Cerro, Havana =

Cerro
- Municipality of Havana
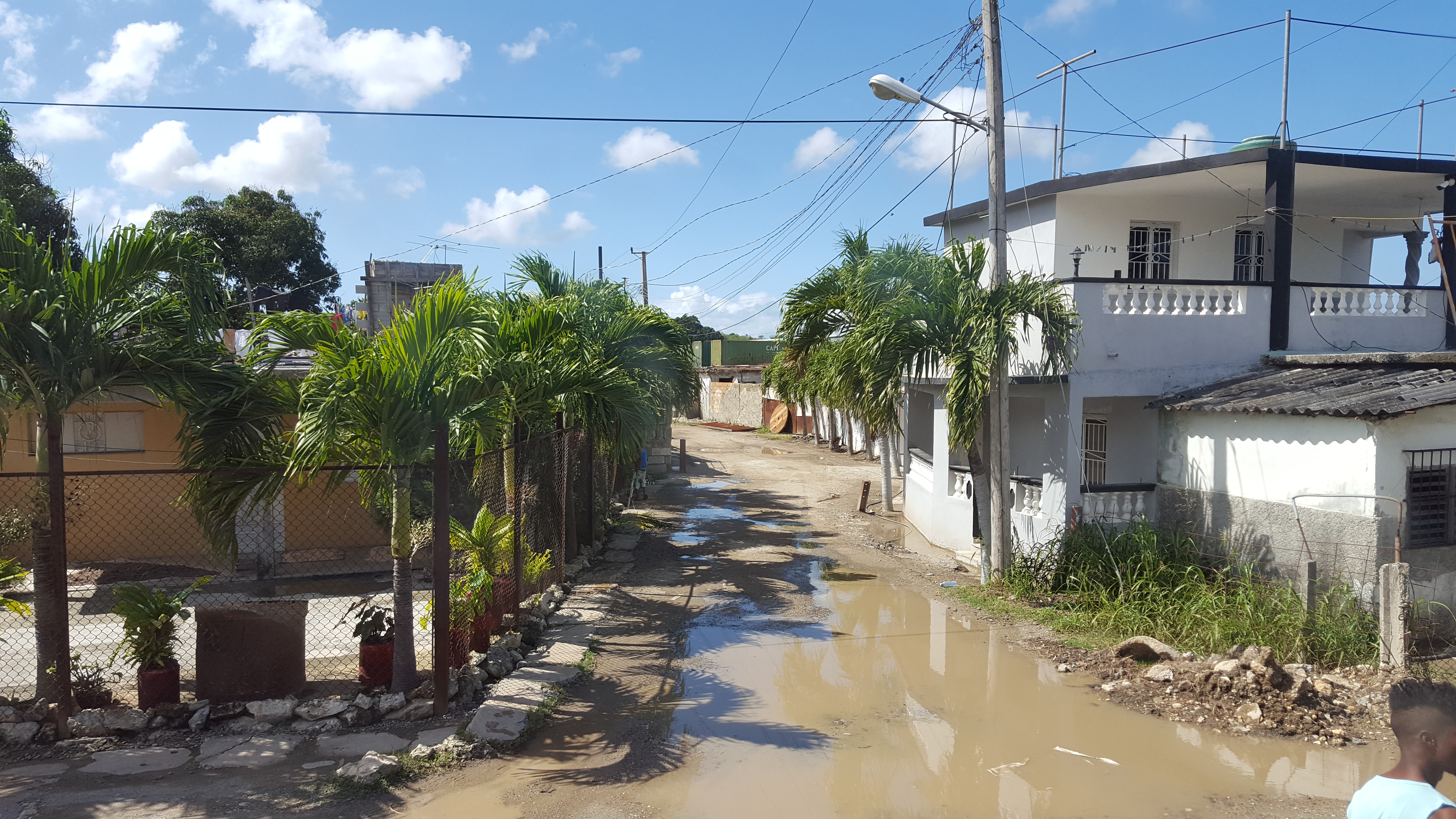

- Coat of arms

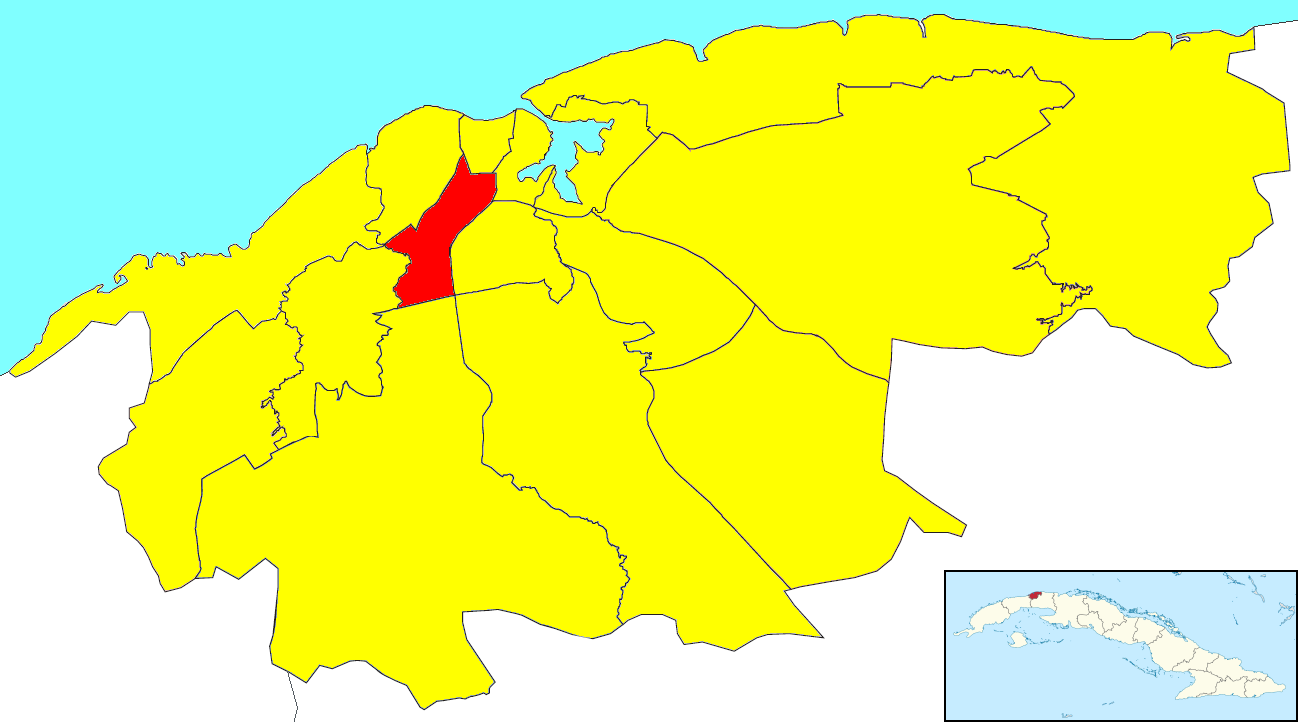
- Location of Cerro in Havana
- Coordinates: 23°5′17″N 82°23′42″W
- Country: Cuba
- Province: Ciudad de La Habana
- Wards (Consejos Populares): Armada, Cerro, El Canal, Las Cañas, Latinoamericano, Palatino, Pilar-Atares

Area
  - Total: 10 km^{2} (3.9 sq mi)
- Elevation: 85 m (279 ft)

Population (2022)
  - Total: 124,994
  - Density: 12,000/km^{2} (32,000/sq mi)
- Time zone: UTC-5 (EST)
- Area code: +53-7

Cerro is one of the 15 municipalities or boroughs (municipios in Spanish) in the city of Havana, Cuba. As of 2016, it is considered one of Havana's poorest municipalities.

== History ==
The area dates from 1803 when two property owners José María Rodríguez and Francisco Betancourt established residence. Their example was followed by many others. In 1807, Cerro was recognized as a town with the construction of the first wooden church, which has been replaced by the current parish buildings.

Cerro was chosen by wealthy families of the capital as a place to spend the summer. In 1843 there existed five large vacation residences, with 23 others notable for their sumptuousness. There were also 273 private homes owned by wealthy families. In 1800, Cerro's population was 2,000; 2,125 in 1843; and by 1858, there were 2,530 permanent residents.
