= Guanajay Municipal Museum =

- Museo Municipal de Guanajay
- Established: 13 February 1981
- Location: Guanajay, Cuba

Guanajay Municipal Museum is a museum located in the 61st street in Guanajay, Cuba. It was established as a museum on 13 February 1981.

The museum holds collections on history and weaponry.

== See also ==
- List of museums in Cuba
