= Mariel Municipal Museum =

Museum in Cuba

- Museo Municipal de Mariel
- Established: 30 December 1981
- Location: Mariel, Cuba

Mariel Municipal Museum is a museum located in the 71st street in Mariel, Cuba. It was established as a museum on 30 December 1981.

The museum holds collections on history, weaponry, archeology, numismatics and decorative arts.

== See also ==
- List of museums in Cuba
