= Playa, Havana =

Playa
- Municipality of Havana
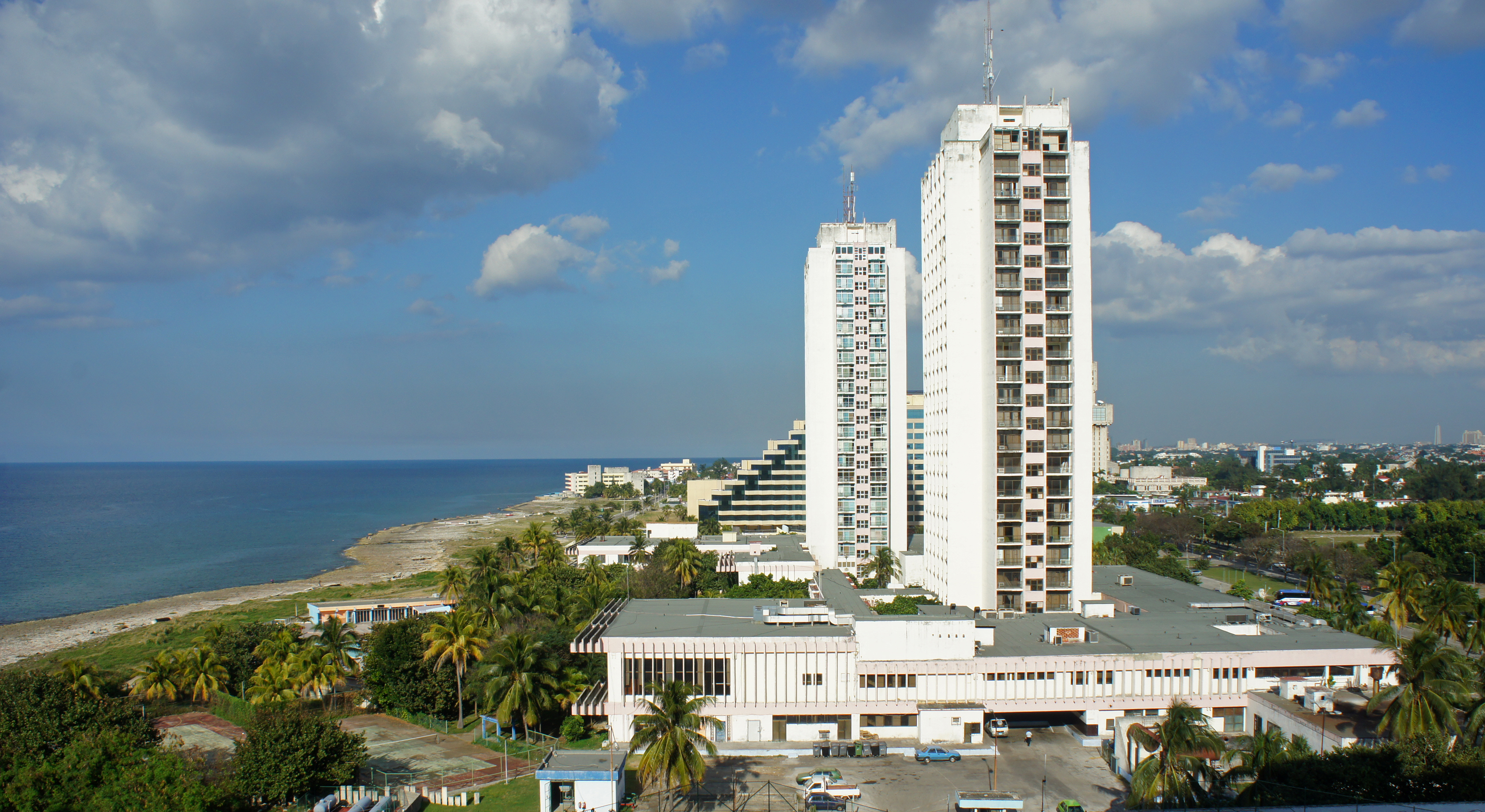
- Miramar beachfront

- Coat of arms

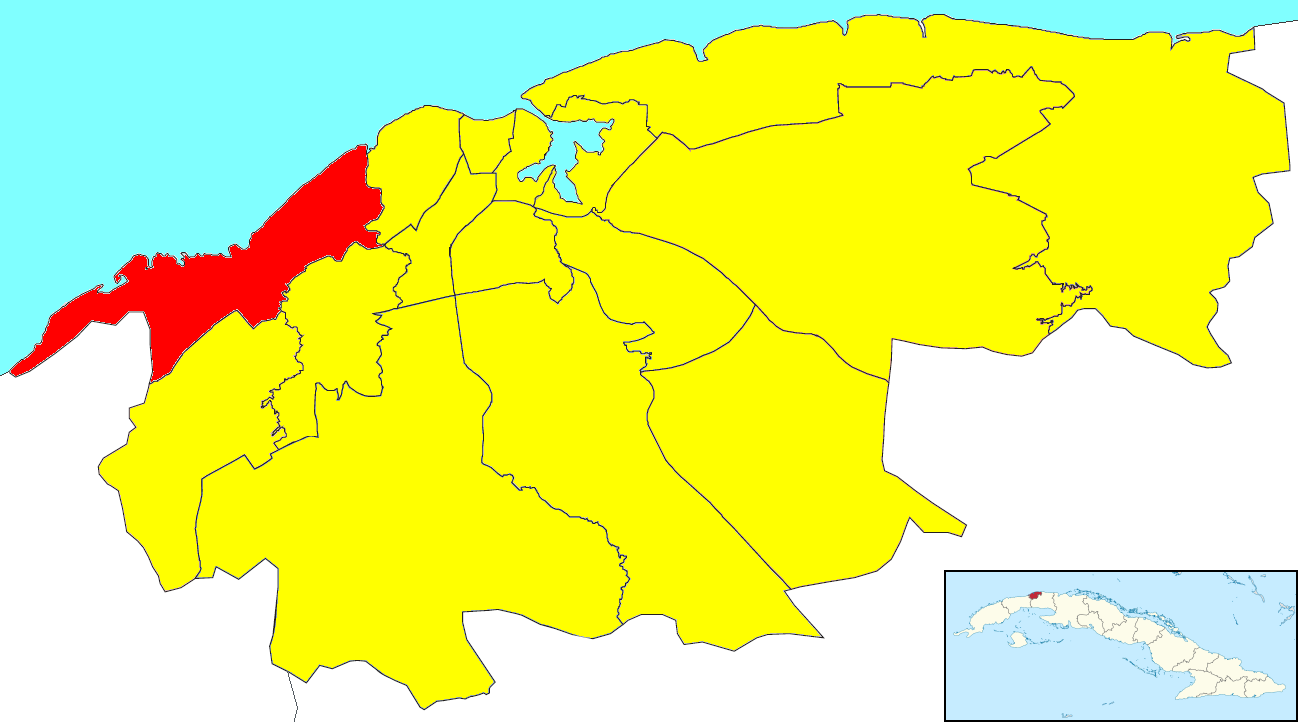
- Location of Playa in Havana
- Coordinates: 23°05′39″N 82°26′56″W
- Country: Cuba
- Province: Ciudad de La Habana
- Wards (Consejos Populares): Ampliación Almendares, Buena Vista, Ceiba, Cubanacán, Miramar, Santa Fe, Siboney, Sierra

Area
  - Total: 35 km^{2} (14 sq mi)

Population (2022)
  - Total: 178,601
  - Density: 5,100/km^{2} (13,000/sq mi)
- Time zone: UTC-5 (EST)
- Area code: +53-7

Playa is a Cuban municipality, located in the Havana province. It covers an area of 36.8 square kilometers, which makes up 8.95% of the provincial extension.

== Geography ==
Playa is the most northwestern of the municipios. It stretches from the Almendares River in the east, to Santa Fe in the west.

It includes the upmarket district of Miramar and the former fishing village of Jaimanitas. Other districts include Flores, Náutico, Siboney, Kohly and Buenavista. Many societies and venues have been located in the area, including the Buena Vista Social Club.

== Education ==
Post-secondary institutions include:

- ELAM (Latin American School of Medicine) in Santa Fe

Primary and secondary schools include:

- International School of Havana in Miramar
- Centro Educativo Español de La Habana in Miramar
- École Française de la Havane (French international school) in Siboney

== See also ==
- Ciudad Libertad Airport
- Puentes Grandes
