= Latin American School of Medicine =

Medical school in Cuba

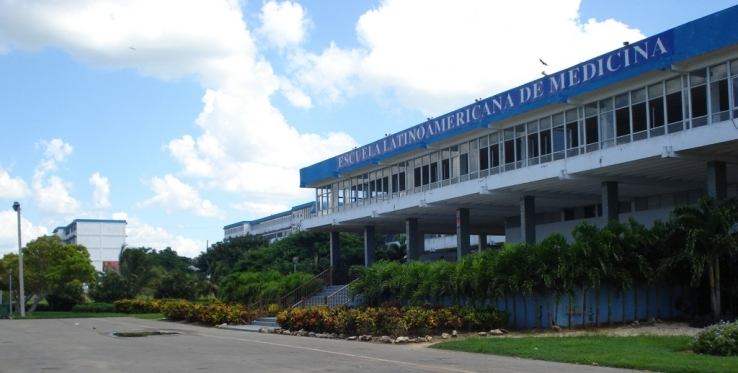
- Type: Public, internationalist, medical
- Established: 1998; 28 years ago
- Students: ~10,000
- Location: La Habana, Cuba; 23.056673°N 82.539597°W
- Colors: Red and green
- Website: instituciones.sld.cu/elam/

Latin American School of Medicine (ELAM) (Spanish: Escuela Latinoamericana de Medicina) is an international public medical school operated by the Cuban government. It was established in 1999.

ELAM has been described as possibly being the largest medical school in the world by enrollment, with approximately 19,550 students from 110 countries as reported in 2012. International students mainly come from Latin America and the Caribbean, as well as Africa and Asia. The school accepts students from the United States — annually, the program receives 150 applications on average, of which about 30 enroll, and 10 travel to Cuba. Tuition, room and board are free, and a small stipend is provided for students.

== Campuses ==
The main campus of Cuba's ELAM is in western Havana in the Santa Fe district of the municipio of Playa, close to the village of Playa Baracoa. This 1.2 km² campus is built on the site of an old naval academy. It consists of 28 buildings with 80 classrooms, 37 laboratories, five amphitheaters, dormitories, an infirmary, and other facilities. The campus facilities were designed to support approximately 3,500 students. The school provides all meals and housing. They also provide uniforms, monthly supplies, and a modest allowance each month.

In 2005, it was announced that the Francophone Caribbean School of Medical Sciences in Santiago de Cuba — a second key campus — had been incorporated into ELAM.

== Mission ==
The mission of ELAM is to make competent and cooperative doctors with the degree of Doctor of Medicine (M.D.), the degree required to practice as a physician across the Americas. The school prefers that its students come from the poorest communities with the intent of returning to practice in those areas in their countries. Initially only enrolling students from Latin America and the Caribbean, the school has become open to applicants from impoverished and/or medically underserved areas in the United States and Africa. As part of Cuban international cooperation, ELAM is also training 800 medical doctors from Timor-Leste.

== Recognition ==
The Latin American School of Medicine is officially recognized by the Educational Commission for Foreign Medical Graduates (ECFMG) and the World Health Organization. It is fully accredited by the Medical Board of California.

== Scholarships ==
The scholarship provides full tuition, dormitory housing, three daily meals in the campus cafeteria, textbooks in Spanish for all courses, a school uniform, bedding, and a monthly stipend of 46,000 Cuban pesos. According to the informal exchange rate reported by El Toque (which listed the U.S. dollar at approximately 492 pesos as of October 25, 2025), this amount is equivalent to about 94 U.S. dollars per month.

== Admissions ==
Applications are processed through accredited Cuban diplomatic missions in the student's home country. Preference is given to applicants who are financially needy and/or people of color who show the most commitment to working in their poor communities.

Final admissions decisions are made by a committee representing ELAM's faculty and the Cuban Ministry of Public Health.

== Curriculum ==
The curriculum includes 6 years medical studies in Spanish. ELAM's pedagogical philosophy centers on intensive tutoring and advising.

The pre-medical program includes courses in health sciences, chemistry, biology, math, physics as well as a 12-week intensive course in the Spanish language. The medical program begins every September and is divided into 12 semesters. Students study at the ELAM campus for the first two years before completing their studies at one of Cuba's 21 other medical schools, including a one-year rotating internship. The Cuban medical training model emphasizes primary healthcare, community medicine and hands-on internship experiences.

Students are required to pass examinations at appropriate points during their course of study. For US students, this includes the United States Medical Licensing Examination.

== History ==
=== Establishment ===
The Cuban government stated that ELAM was conceived by President Fidel Castro as part of Cuba's humanitarian and development aid response (known as the "Integral Health Plan for Central America and the Caribbean") to the devastation caused by Hurricane Georges and Hurricane Mitch in 1998, which affected several countries in Central America and the Caribbean, including Cuba. More than 11,000 people died in the resulting floods and mudslides. In response, The Cuban government offered 500 full medical scholarships per year for the next decade to students from four countries — the Dominican Republic, Haiti, Honduras and Nicaragua — seriously affected by the hurricanes.

Upon arriving in the mostly rural areas, the Cuban doctors discovered that many people suffered chronic, long-term illnesses. Instead of broken bones, they were treating river blindness and stunted growth. In places like the Mosquito Coast of Honduras, the Cubans were the first doctors the patients had ever seen. In support of this plan, ELAM was opened in March 1999 and started its full medical program in September 1999 with approximately 1,900 student in its initial classes. On November 15, 1999, ELAM was officially inaugurated as Havana hosted the 9th Ibero-American Summit (at this time, ELAM had 1,929 students from 18 countries).

The first class of 1,498 ELAM doctors graduated on August 20, 2005, with 112 from other Cuban medical schools: 28 other countries in Latin America, the Caribbean, and the United States were represented by the graduates. The ceremony was led by Castro and Venezuelan President Hugo Chávez. Reportedly attending were Prime Minister Baldwin Spencer of Antigua and Barbuda, Prime Minister Roosevelt Skerrit of Dominica, Prime Minister Keith Mitchell of Grenada, President Martín Torrijos of Panama, Prime Minister Denzil Douglas of St. Kitts & Nevis and Prime Minister Ralph Gonsalves of St. Vincent & the Grenadines as well as high-ranking government representatives of The Bahamas, Barbados, Belize, the Dominican Republic, Ecuador, Grenada, Guatemala, Guyana, Jamaica, St. Lucia, Suriname and Trinidad and Tobago.

=== Cooperation with the United States ===
In June 2000, a US Congressional Black Caucus (CBC) delegation visited Cuba to meet with Castro. Representative Bennie Thompson (D-Miss.) mentioned to Castro that his district had a shortage of doctors; he responded by offering full scholarships for US nationals from Mississippi at ELAM. Later that same June, in a Washington, D.C. meeting with the CBC, the Cuban Minister of Public Health expanded the offer to all districts represented by the CBC. At a September 2000 speech event at Riverside Church, New York City, Castro publicly announced a further expanded offer which was reported as allowing several hundred places at ELAM for medical students from low-income communities from any part of the US. Reports of the size of this offer varied in the US press: 250 or 500 places were suggested with perhaps half reserved for African-Americans and half for Hispanics and Native Americans. The ELAM offer to US students was classified as a "cultural exchange" program by the US State Department to avoid the restrictions of the U.S. embargo against Cuba. The first intake of US students into ELAM occurred in spring 2001, with 10 enrolling in the pre-medical program.

In 2004, the legality of the presence of US students at ELAM was threatened by tightened restrictions against travel to Cuba by US nationals under the administration of President George W. Bush. A CBC campaign led by Representatives Barbara Lee (D-Calif.) and Charles Rangel (D-NY) with 27 other members of Congress persuaded Secretary of State Colin Powell to exempt ELAM from the tightened restrictions.

Applications from US citizens had been administered through the New York City-based Interreligious Foundation for Community Organization (IFCO), formerly headed by human rights activist and critic of the U.S. embargo of Cuba, the late Rev. Lucius Walker Jr.

=== Cooperation with Pakistan ===
The 2005 Pakistan earthquake (also known as the 2005 Kashmir earthquake, the South Asian earthquake or the Great Pakistan earthquake) was a major earthquake centered in Kashmir and in North West Frontier Province (NWFP) near the city of Muzaffarabad, Pakistan. In the international response to the 2005 Kashmir earthquake many countries, international organizations and non-governmental organizations offered relief aid to the affected regions.

Cuba offered 1000 scholarships in medicine for Pakistani students. The project was handed over to Higher Education Commission of Pakistan, which selected the students from all over the country. The first batch of approximately 312 students arrived Cuba in February 2007 and the second batch joined them the following year. In accordance with the ELAM's rules, the students received a one-year language course in Spanish which included a premedical certificate. After the completion of the Spanish language course, all the students were moved to the different campuses of ELAM situated in other provinces, where these students are studying with other students from 50 countries and will receive an MD degree after completion of their 6 years medical studies, that includes one year of internship at affiliated hospitals. The first batch of 298 Pakistani students has been graduated and returned to Pakistan and the second batch of more than 600 students is expected to graduate in February 2015.

== See also ==
- 1998 Atlantic hurricane season
- List of medical schools in the Caribbean
