= La Habana Province =

Province of Cuba

La Habana Province Provincia de La Habana
- Province in Cuba
- Country: Cuba
- Region: West
- Foundation: March 1878
- Seat: Havana

Government
  - Governor: Yanet Hernández Pérez

Area
  - Total: 728.26 km^{2} (281.18 sq mi)
- Highest elevation: 219 m (719 ft)

Population (2022)
  - Total: 2,137,847
  - Rank: 1st in Cuba
  - Density: 2,935.6/km^{2} (7,603.1/sq mi)
- Demonym: habaneros-habaneras
- Time zone: UTC−5 (EST)
- Area code: +53-47
- HDI (2019): 0.834 very high · 1st of 16
- Website: www.cubagob.cu

La Habana Province [la aˈβana], formerly known as Ciudad de La Habana Province, is a province of Cuba that includes the territory of the city of Havana, the Republic's capital. The province's territory is the seat of the superior organs of the state and its provincial administration.

Between 1878 and 2010, the name referred to a different province that covered a much larger area, and after 1976 restructuring, the then-La Habana Province did not include the city of Havana. The larger province was subdivided in 2010 into the present-day provinces of Artemisa (which also took over three municipalities from Pinar del Río) and Mayabeque.

== History ==
The Province of Havana was created in 1878, is one of the 6 original provinces in which the island was divided, still under Spanish colonial rule.

In the political administrative division of 1976, in which the country was divided into 14 provinces, the original Province of Havana was divided into Havana City Province (Ciudad de La Habana; the capital) and Havana Province (areas surrounding the capital). Havana City Province integrated the territories of the metropolitan region of the capital, including Havana, Marianao, Guanabacoa, Regla, and Santiago de las Vegas. From 1976 until 2010, the provincial administration of Havana Province had its headquarters located in Havana City Province, since it lacked a capital of its own.

On August 1, 2010, the National Assembly made another modification of the territorial organization of Cuba, segmenting the then-Province of Havana (the areas surrounding the capital), colloquially called "Habana Campo", in two new provinces; Artemisa Province to the west, and Mayabeque Province to the east. With this change, which went into effect as of January 1, 2011, Havana City Province became known simply as Havana Province, as differentiation was no longer needed. Additionally, three municipalities of Pinar del Río Province (Bahía Honda, Candelaria and San Cristóbal) were transferred to the new Artemisa Province.

== Municipalities ==
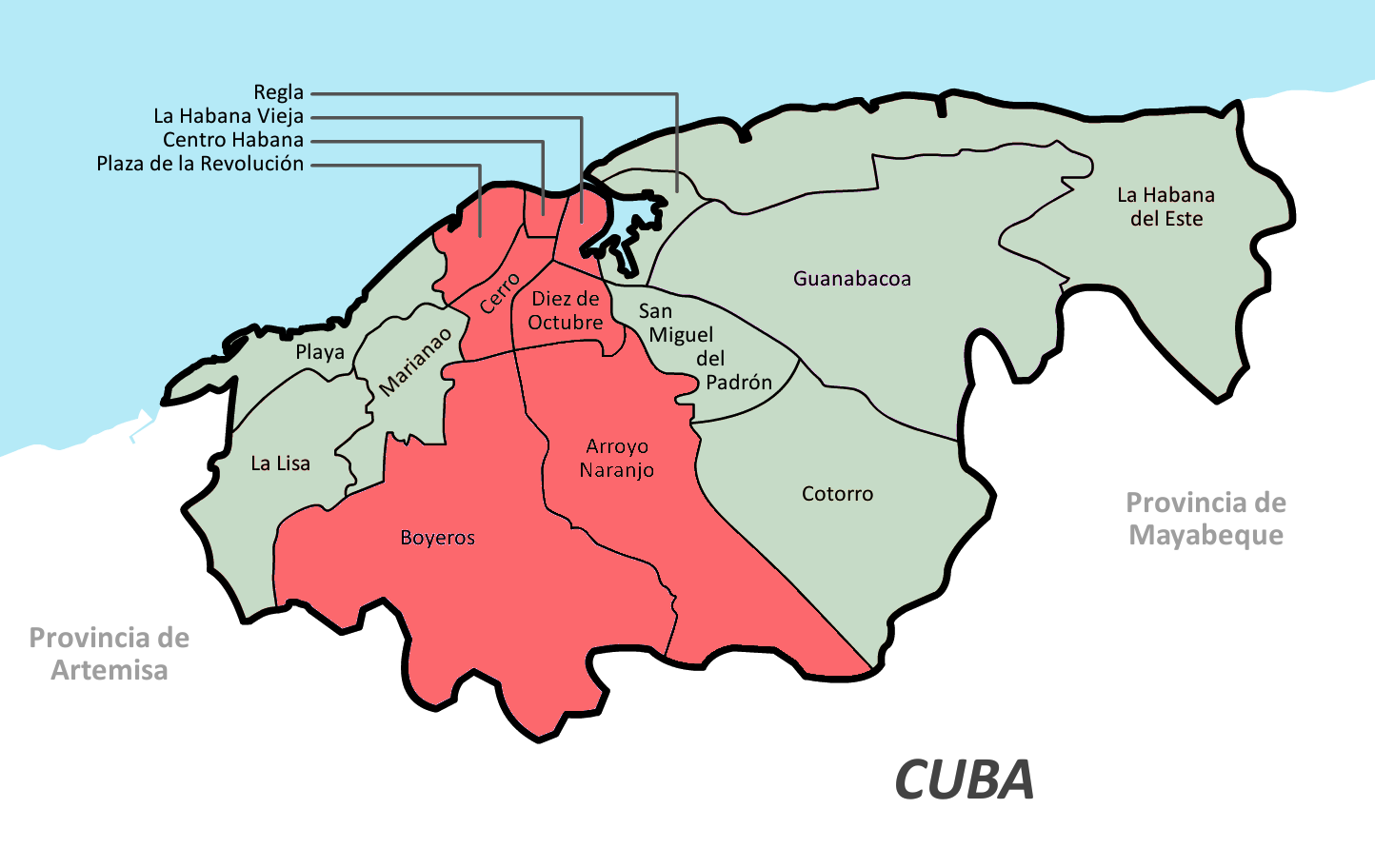
The actual municipalities of the Havana Province. The red colored municipalities (which acts as boroughs) are the original City of Havana while the rest in green are municipalities that combine to be part of the Metropolitan Havana and Province.

Before 1961, Havana was the official name only of the central municipality of a conurbated area that included at least 6 municipalities: Havana, Marianao, Regla, Guanabacoa, Santiago de las Vegas and Santa María del Rosario-Cotorro. Currently, the territory that occupies the old municipality of Havana (former Villa of San Cristóbal de La Habana) is divided into 6 municipalities (Plaza de la Revolución, La Habana Vieja, Centro Habana, Diez de Octubre, Cerro, Arroyo Naranjo), and Boyeros (Altahabana). The city, as it is conceived at the present time, includes all the provincial territory, also includes the territories of 9 municipalities that were not part of old Havana municipality, which are: Playa, Marianao, La Lisa, Guanabacoa, Regla, Habana del Este, San Miguel del Padrón, Cotorro and Boyeros.

Municipio	Population	Area (Km^{2})	Density
Arroyo Naranjo	200,451	82	2,445 / km^{2}
Boyeros	188,217	130	1,448 / km^{2}
Centro Habana	140,234	3	46,745 / km^{2}
Cerro	122,999	10	12,300 / km^{2}
Cotorro	77,066	66	1,168 / km^{2}
Diez de Octubre	206,052	12	17,171 / km^{2}
Guanabacoa	115,180	129	893 / km^{2}
La Habana del Este	174,493	141	1,238 / km^{2}
La Habana Vieja	87,772	4	21,943 / km^{2}
La Lisa	136,231	37	3,682 / km^{2}
Marianao	134,529	22	6,115 / km^{2}
Playa	179,647	35	5,133 / km^{2}
Plaza de la Revolución	147,789	12	12,316 / km^{2}
Regla	42,420	10	4,242 / km^{2}
San Miguel del Padrón	153,066	26	5,887 / km^{2}
Total in the City (Proper)	1,093,514	253	4,322/ km^{2}
Total in the Province	2,106,146	719	2,929/ km^{2}

=== Neighborhoods ===
Municipality	Sections, neighborhoods and towns
Arroyo Naranjo	Poey, Santa Amalia, Mantilla, La Palma, Víbora Park, Los Pinos, Managua, Calvario, Güinera, Eléctrico, Párraga.
Boyeros	Santiago de las Vegas, Rancho Boyeros, Calabazar, Abel Santmaría, Fontanar, Wajay, Altahabana, Capdevila, Aldabó.
Centro Habana	Cayo Hueso, Dragones (Barrio Chino), Colón, Los Sitios, Pueblo Nuevo.
Cerro	El Cerro, Casino Deportivo, Las Cañas, Palatino, El Canal.
Cotorro	Santa María del Rosario, Cotorro, Cuatro Caminos, Alberro.
Diez de Octubre	Víbora, Santos Suárez, Lawton, Luyanó, Sevillano, Vista Alegre, Tamarindo.
Guanabacoa	Guanabacoa, Chibás, D'Beche, Minas, Barreras, La Jata.
La Habana del Este	Alamar, Camilo Cienfuegos, Guiteras, Villa Panamericana, Cojímar, Guanabo, Boca Ciega, Campo Florido.
La Habana Vieja	Barrios del casco histórico, Tallapiedra
La Lisa	La Lisa, Alturas de la Lisa, Arroyo Arenas, Punta Brava, Arimao, El Cano, San Agustín, La Coronela.
Marianao	Los Quemados, Pogolotti, Los Pocitos, Santa Felicia, El Palmar, Belén, Zamora, Coco Solo.
Playa	Miramar, Buenavista, La Ceiba, La Sierra, Kolhi, Siboney, Atabey, Santa Fe, Jaimanitas, Flores, Cubanacán, Almendares.
Plaza de la Revolución	El Vedado, Nuevo Vedado, Príncipe, Plaza, Puentes Grandes.
Regla	Regla, Casablanca.
San Miguel del Padrón	San Miguel, Diezmero, Alturas de Luyanó, Rocafort, San Fco. de Paula, Jacomino, California, Juanelo, La Rosalía, La Fernanda.

Source: Oficina Nacional de Estadísticas 2010
