= Mariel, Cuba =

Mariel
- Municipality
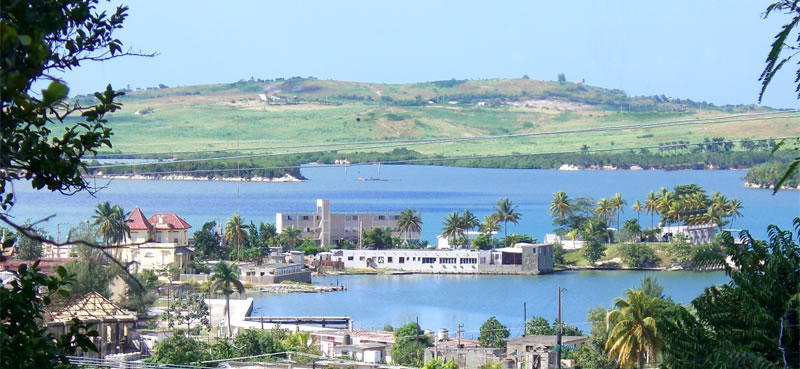
- View of Mariel and Mariel Bay

- Coat of arms

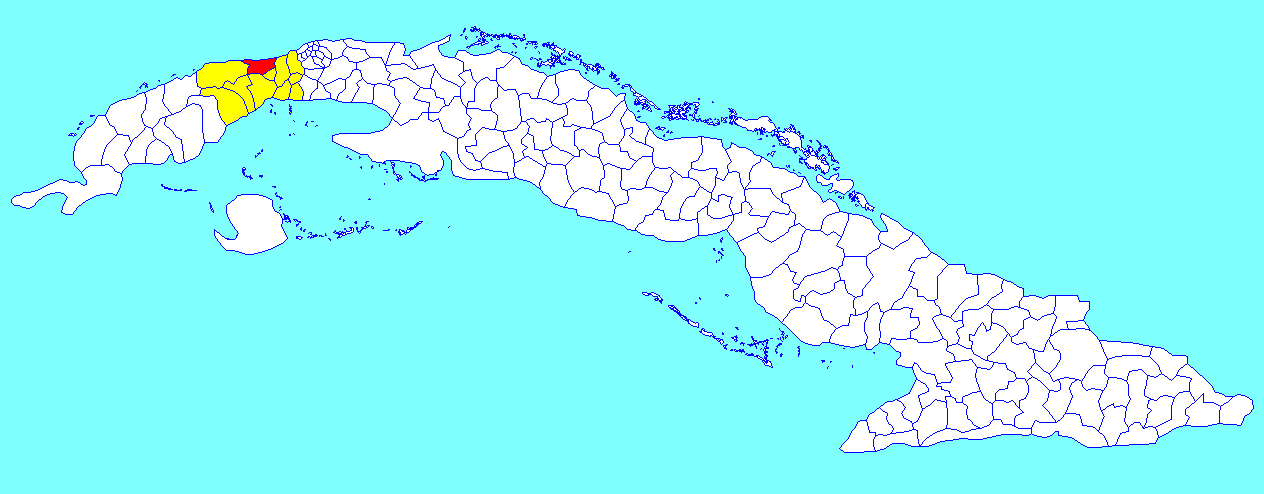
- Mariel municipality (red) within Artemisa Province (yellow) and Cuba
- Coordinates: 22°59′37″N 82°45′14″W
- Country: Cuba
- Province: Artemisa

Area
  - Total: 269 km^{2} (104 sq mi)
- Elevation: 5 m (16 ft)

Population (2022)
  - Total: 44,461
  - Density: 165/km^{2} (428/sq mi)
- Time zone: UTC-5 (EST)
- Area code: +53-7
- Climate: Am

Mariel is a municipality and town in the Artemisa Province of Cuba. It is located approximately 40 kilometres (25 mi) west of the city of Havana.

== Geography ==
The town is situated on the south-east side of the Mariel Bay. The villages of La Boca, Henequen, Mojica, Quiebra Hacha, and Cabañas are the major settlements composing the municipality of Mariel.

== History ==
Agustín Parlá Orduña, born in Key West on October 11, 1887, of Cuban parents exiled during the struggle for Cuban's independence, was the first man to fly 119 miles (192 km) over the sea from Key West, Florida to El Mariel, Cuba, on May 19, 1913.

The port of Mariel is the nearest port to the United States. In 1980, some 125,000 Cubans left Mariel and went to the United States in what is known as the Mariel boatlift. While many reached the US, several died while traveling through the ocean. Those involved became known as "Marielitos".

== Demographics ==
In 2022, the municipality of Mariel had a population of 44,461. With a total area of 269 km^{2} (104 sq mi), it has a population density of 170/km^{2} (440/sq mi).

== Transport ==
=== Overview ===
On the east side of the bay are a port, cement works and a power station, which contribute to very high levels of environmental contamination. On the west side of the bay is a former submarine base, later designated as a free trade zone.

=== New Port of Mariel Development Project ===
Following an agreement reached in 2009 between the governments of Brazil and Cuba, the Brazilian engineering firm Grupo Odebrecht built a new port, including a major container terminal, in partnership with the Cuban company "Zona de Desarrollo Integral de Mariel", a subsidiary of the Cuban military controlled Almacenes Universal S.A. This project received an agreement from the Brazilian government to subsidize it up to US$800 million, out of which $300 million would have been already appropriated.

The port has been dredged to 18 m (60 ft), enabling it to be used by Super-Panamax vessels.

Various Cuban and international media (such as Reuters) report the future Port of Mariel would be designed to have an initial 700 metres (770 yards) of berth length, enabling it to receive simultaneously two large ocean vessels. Plans through 2022 call for Mariel to house logistics facilities for offshore oil exploration and development, a new container terminal, general cargo, bulk and refrigerated handling and storage facilities as well as a Special Economic Development Zone for light manufacturing and storage. The new Mariel Port can handle deeper vessels than Havana Bay, where a tunnel under the channel restricts depths to 11 metres (36 feet). The Mariel container terminal would have an annual capacity of 850,000 to 1 million containers, compared with Havana's 350,000. These developments should enable Mariel to accommodate the very large container ships which will transit from Asia through the Panama Canal once the enlargement of the latter is completed in the summer of 2014.

Early June 2011 it was announced that the contract for the operation of the future new Port of Mariel container terminal had been awarded by the Cuban government to PSA International, a leading global Singaporean port operator. Earlier on, it had been reported that the Emirati operator DP World (Dubai Ports World) was the leading contender for this contract.

Mariel is ideally situated to handle U.S. cargoes when the American trade embargo is eventually lifted, and will receive U.S. food exports already flowing into the country under a 2000 amendment to the US sanctions. If these technical and political developments occur, and if the Mariel container terminal are operationally and financially competitive, Mariel could become one of the major hub ports of the Caribbean region, competing against the existing hub ports of Freeport, Bahamas; Kingston, Jamaica; Multimodal Caucedo Port, Dominican Republic; Port of Spain, Trinidad and Tobago; and Panama, which receive very large container ships with cargo containers originating or bound to multiple regional origins and destinations, including US ports.

The new port, with improved highway, railroad, and communications infrastructure, began operating in January 2014. Brazilian President Dilma Rousseff accompanied Raúl Castro to inaugurate the first completed section of the new container terminal.

Cuba created the special economic zone in 2014 with the goal of using tax breaks and customs breaks to attract foreign investment. As of late 2018, 43 applications from foreign businesses had been approved and 17 foreign companies were operating in the zone. As of 2023, Havana Energy and French utility Hive are building utility-scale solar energy plants in the zone.

The special development zone is exempt from normal Cuban economic legislation. Foreign investors in the zone must contribute 0.5% of their income to the SDZ development and maintenance fund and pay a 1% sales and service tax for local transactions. Cuban enterprises which supply domestic products and services to foreign businesses operating in the zone are permitted to retain 50% of their profits.

== Notable Person ==
- Mariel Hemingway was named after this town.

== See also ==
- Mariel boatlift
- Mariel Municipal Museum
- Autopista Havana–Mariel
- Municipalities of Cuba
- List of cities in Cuba
