= Artemisa =

- Municipality
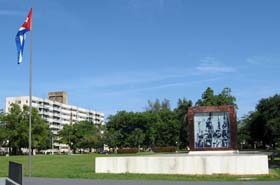
- The Martyrs Mausoleum (Mausoleo de los Mártires)

- Coat of arms Coat of Arms (City)

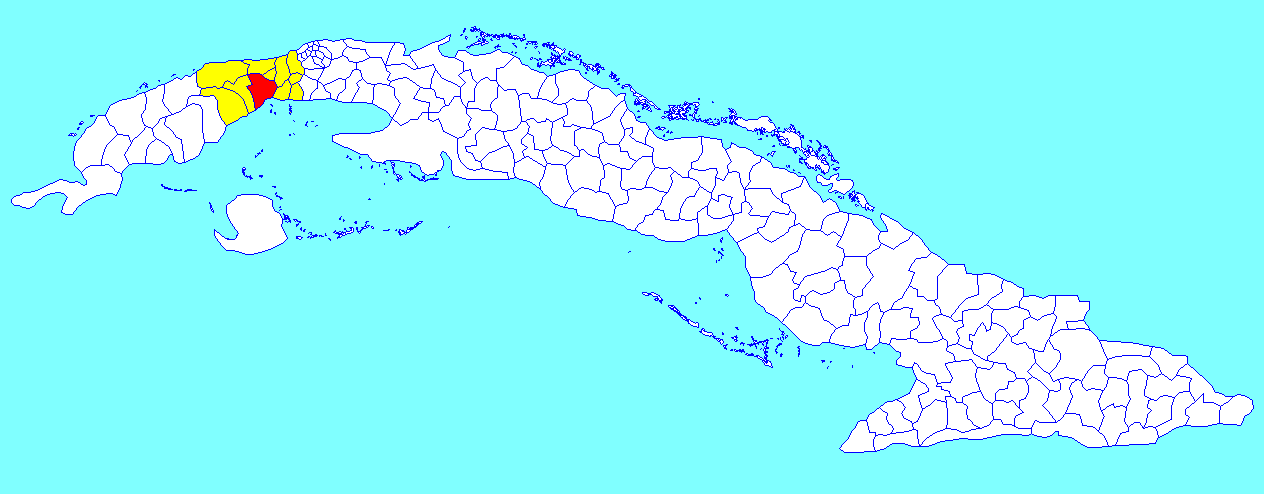
- Artemisa municipality (red) within Artemisa Province (yellow) and Cuba
- Coordinates: 22°48′49″N 82°45′48″W
- Country: Cuba
- Province: Artemisa
- Founded: 1818
- Incorporated: 1976
- Founder: Francisco de Arango y Parreño

Government
  - President: Euler Velázquez Castillo

Area
  - Municipality: 690 km^{2} (270 sq mi)
- Elevation: 50 m (160 ft)

Population (2022)
  - Municipality: 86,444
  - Density: 130/km^{2} (320/sq mi)
  - Urban: 60,765
- Demonym(s): Artemiseño, -a
- Time zone: UTC-5 (EST)
- Area code: +53-47
- Climate: Aw

Artemisa (Spanish pronunciation: [aɾteˈmisa]) is a municipality and city in Cuba, formerly part of La Habana Province. According to a law approved by the Cuban National Assembly in August 2010, Artemisa became the capital city of the newly formed Artemisa Province, which comprises eight municipalities of the former La Habana Province and three from Pinar del Río. It has an area of 642.0 square kilometers and a population of over 86,444 inhabitants (2022).

Due to its coffee crops in the past and the bucolic local landscape, it has received the nickname "Jardín de Cuba" (Garden of Cuba) and is also known as the "Villa Roja" (Red Village) due to the color of its soils.

The municipality is home to the University of Artemisa, which trains professionals in agricultural sciences, high school and higher education teachers, business sciences, among others. There is also the Faculty of Medical Sciences of Artemisa, which trains doctors, dentists and other health professionals.

== History ==
The town was founded in 1818. It arose as a result of a fire that occurred on 25 April 1802, in the Jesús María and Guadalupe neighborhoods in the city of Havana, which left many families homeless and pressured the Royal Consulate of Agriculture, Industry and Commerce to approve the creation of populations in extramural areas. In 1818, thanks to the donation of Don Francisco de Arango y Peñalver, the construction of the church began, which was inaugurated on 22 December 1825. The origin of the name of Artemisa is uncertain. It has been argued to have originated from the Greek goddess Artemis (Diana, in the Roman version) or that it refers to the name of Ragweed in Spanish, Artemisia (Ambrosia artemisifolia), abundant at the time.

The municipality is founded on 9 June 1878, by royal decree in which this city is assigned as the head. On 1 January 1879, the first meeting of the City Council is held.

Although Artemisa did not participate in the first War of Liberation against Spain in 1868–78 (Guerra de los Diez Años), since it did not reach the West of the country, it did in the one of 95 in which more than 200 children of that region joined the Mambi forces, of which 135 survivors were discharged. Among them, important figures stand out such as Manuel Valdés (the first Artemiseño martyr, messenger of the Mambi forces), Colonel Federico Nuñez, General Alberto Nodarse Bacallao (who was part of General Antonio Maceo's staff when he fell in San Pedro) and the parish priest of the Church of Artemisa, Guillermo González Arocha.

The territory of Artemisa suffered in that period from the "Reconcentration" policy of Captain General Valeriano Weyler, a direct precedent of the Nazi concentration camps, who in an attempt to cut off the support of the liberating troops among the Cuban rural population, forced it to concentrate in urban places.

Artemisa was an important source of fighters supporting Fidel Castro's Revolution during the attack on "Cuartel Moncada" in Santiago de Cuba (1953) and Sierra Maestra Guerrilla (1956–1959). Ramiro Valdés Menéndez, Vice President of the Council of State of Cuba, who was also a combatant alongside Che, is a native of Artemisa. Two other Artemiseños also stood out in the Revolution as members of the leadership of two other organizations: Eduardo García Lavandero of the Revolutionary Directorate 13 March and Carlos Rodríguez Careaga of the Popular Socialist Party. The Martyrs Mausoleum (Mausoleo de los Mártires) in Artemisa is a National Monument of Cuba.

Artemisa belonged to Pinar del Río Province until 1970 and La Habana Province until the 2011 creation of the namesake province, of which it was made capital.

== Geography ==
The Artemisa municipality is located in the center of the Artemisa Province, bordering to the north with the Mariel and Guanajay municipalities; to the east with the municipalities Caimito and Alquízar; to the south with the Ensenada de Majana and to the west with the municipality of Candelaria.

Wards (consejos populares) of the municipality include Cayajabo, Centro, Corojal, La Matilde, Las Cañas, Lavandero, Lincoln, Reparto Nuevo, and Todelo.

== Demographics ==
In 2022, the municipality of Artemisa had a population of 81,209. With a total area of 690 km^{2} (270 sq mi), it has a population density of 130/km^{2} (340/sq mi).

== Economy ==
During the 19th century, the town evolved with great economic prosperity based on the boom in coffee first and tobacco and sugar later.

Artemisa came to have approximately 47 coffee plantations. The most renowned was "Angerona", considered the second largest coffee plantation in Cuba. El Pilar and Andorra, both, have been closed at the beginning of the 21st century. The sugar industry has ceased to have a leading role in the municipality.

Economic development was favored by the arrival of the railway in 1864 and, later, the construction of the Central Highway of Cuba, these were decisive factors in the rise of the municipality, which became an important destination between Pinar del Río and Havana.

The current economy of Artemisa is based on agriculture (fruits, various crops, rice, sugar cane), pig farming, the cement industry and other construction materials, tobacco manufacturing, textile manufacturing, and pesticides.

== Main sights ==
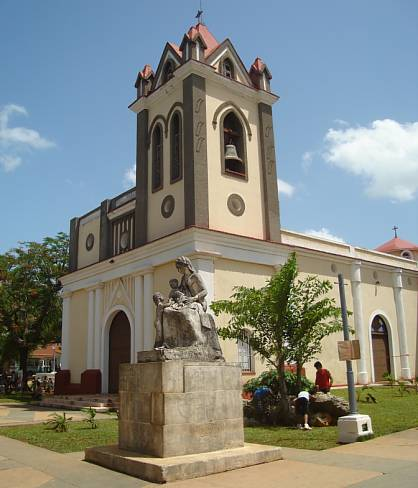
Church of Artemisa

Places of historical importance include the Cafetal Angerona (named after Angerona, the goddess of silence and fertility, and protector of Rome), which is currently in ruins. Its remains evoke a period of great abundance, business development, love affairs, and slavery. The cafetal belonged to the German entrepreneur Cornelio Souchay who fell in love with the black Haitian, Úrsula Lambert. The couple lived their romance in secret due to the taboos of the period.

The Hotel Campoamor, built by Asturiano Fernando González-Campoamor, has played an important role since it was finished in 1911. Many important figures visited the place, including Rita Longa, Ernest Hemingway, Juan Marinello, Gabriela Mistral, and Ignacio Villa "Bola de Nieve." Centrales azucareros (Sugar mills) Pilar and Lavandero are landmarks of the city, as well as the mansion of sugar magnate, Julio Lobo.

Artemisa's patron saint is Saint Mark the Evangelist. The church of Artemisa is located in The Park (el Parque). The building was renovated due to efforts made by Father Antonio Rodriguez Dias, the hard work and cooperation of many Artemiseños, and generous monetary donations from German brethren.

Other sites include the Artemisa Municipal Museum.

== Personalities ==
Important personalities in the history of Cuba were born or lived in Artemisa. Among them Magdalena Peñarredonda, a poet and journalist, appointed as captain of rebel forces during the war of independence, Father Guillermo González Arocha, born in Regla, but whose significant contribution to the independence of Cuba was carried out while a priest in Artemisa, is considered an adopted son of the city. This priest also founded a school and had the cemetery of the city built. Legendary trumpet star Arturo Sandoval was also from Artemisa before his defection to the U.S. in 1990.

Orlando Ortega, a Spanish Athlete, is also from Artemisa.

== See also ==
- Municipalities of Cuba
- List of cities in Cuba
