= Guanajay =

- Municipality
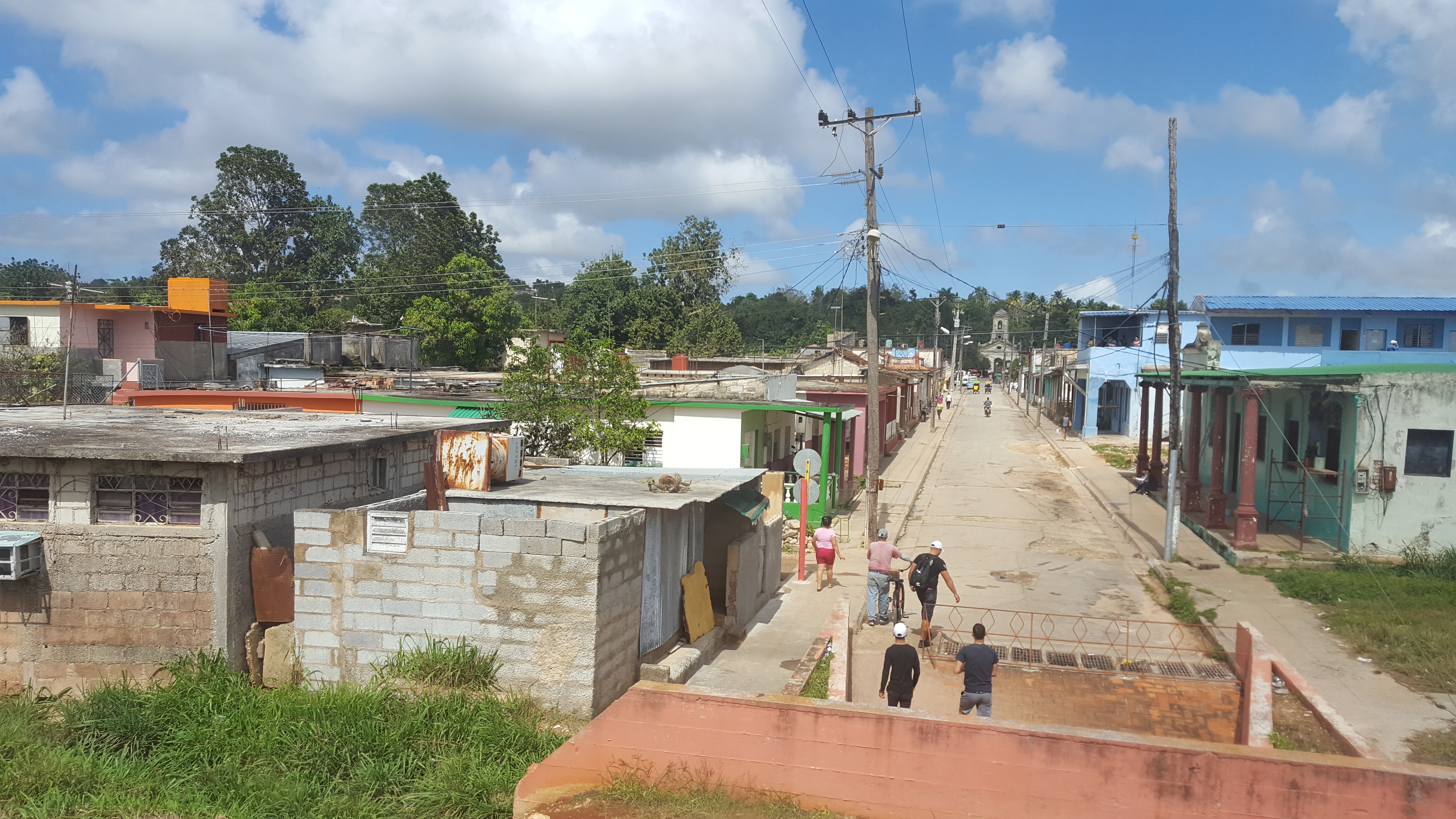

- Coat of arms

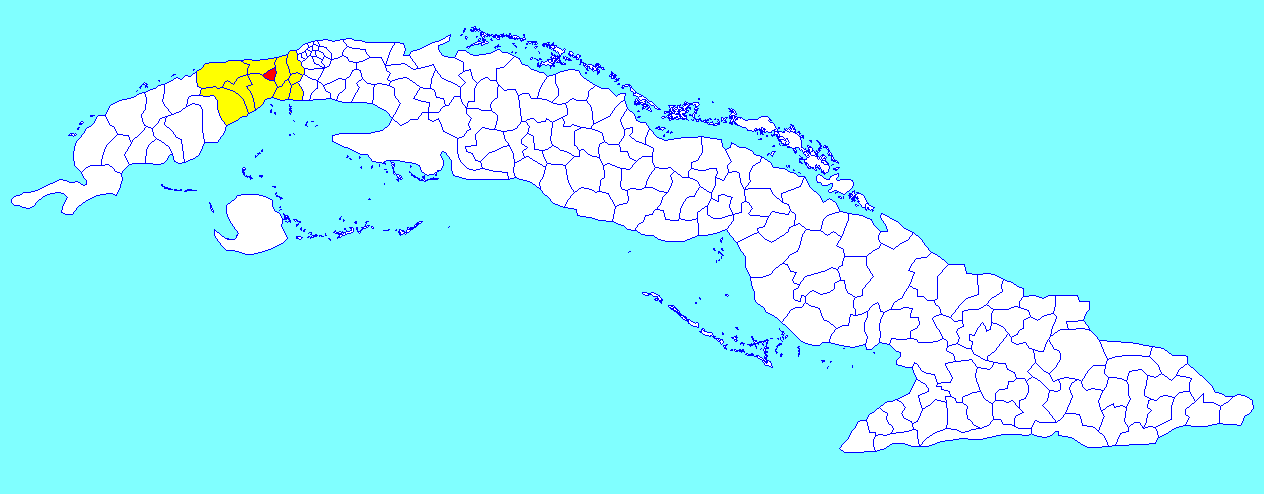
- Guanajay municipality (red) within Artemisa Province (yellow) and Cuba
- Coordinates: 22°55′50″N 82°41′17″W
- Country: Cuba
- Province: Artemisa
- Founded: 1781

Area
  - Total: 113 km^{2} (44 sq mi)
- Elevation: 110 m (360 ft)

Population (2022)
  - Total: 28,031
  - Density: 248/km^{2} (642/sq mi)
- Time zone: UTC−5 (EST)
- Area code: +53-7
- Climate: Am

Guanajay is a town and municipality in Artemisa Province in western Cuba, located about 58 km (36 mi) southwest of Havana. The town lies among hills.

Guanajay is the twin town of Axtla De Terrazas.

== Overview ==
In colonial times it was an acclimatization station for newly arrived troops from Spain, and subsequently became well known as a health resort. Founded in 1650, it was part of the province of Pinar del Río until 1976. It was then included in La Habana Province until that was divided in two in 2011.

The country surrounding Guanajay is a fertile sugarcane and tobacco region, and historically it has been an important distribution point in the commerce of the western end of the island. Guanajay was an ancient pueblo of considerable size and importance as early as the end of the 18th century.

== Demographics ==
In 2022, the municipality of Guanajay had a population of 28,031. With a total area of 113 km^{2} (44 sq mi), it has a population density of 250/km^{2} (650/sq mi).

== Gallery ==
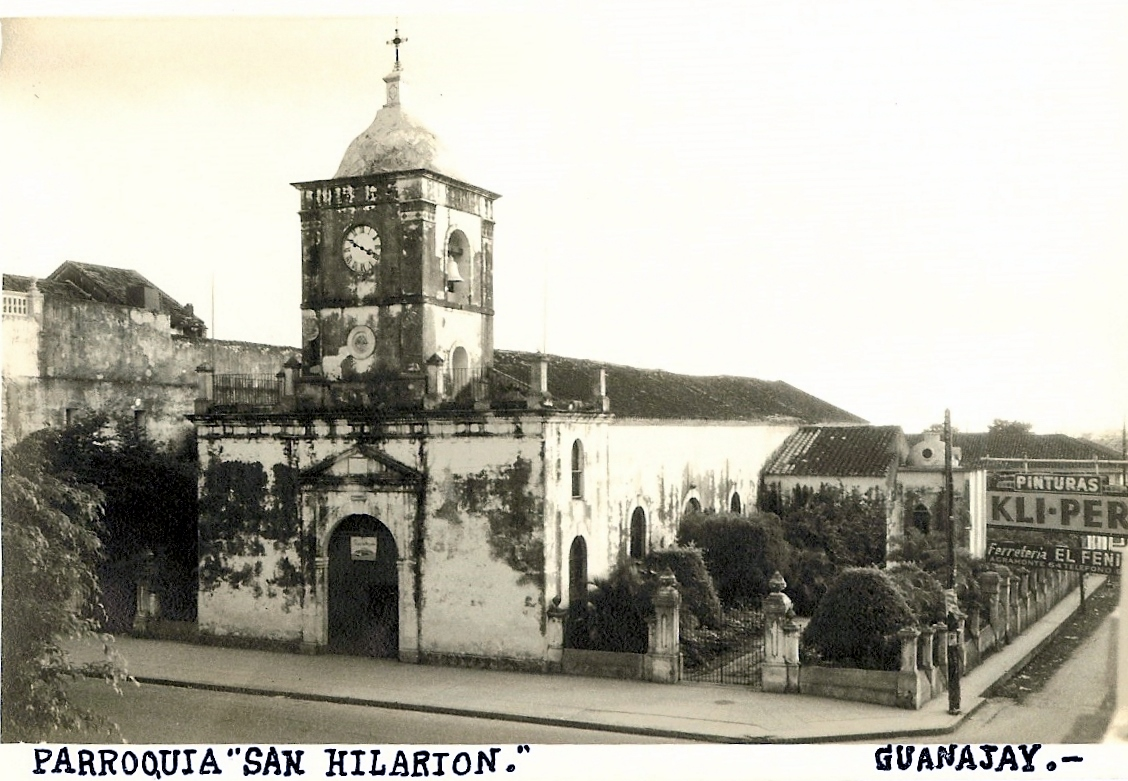
San Hilarión Parrish c. 1930

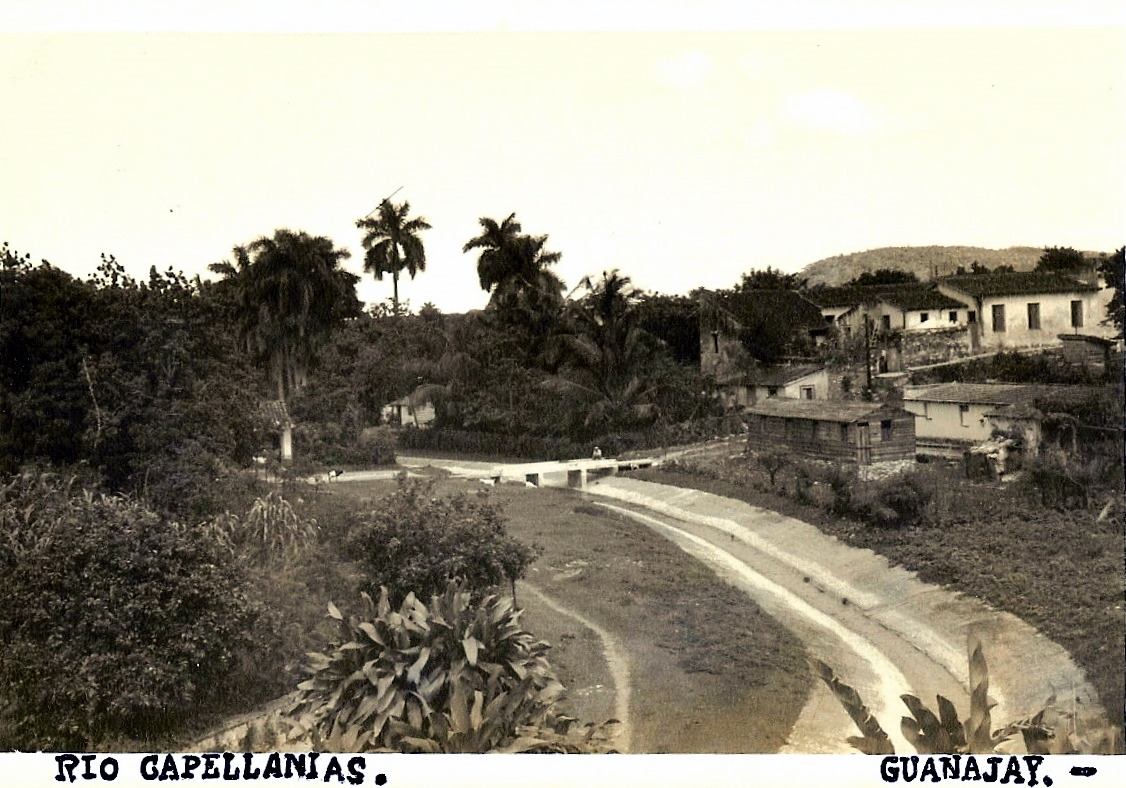
Capellanias River in Guanajay c. 1930

== See also ==
- Guanajay Municipal Museum
- List of cities in Cuba
- Municipalities of Cuba
