= Artemisa Province =

Province of Cuba

- Province
- Coat of arms

- Coordinates: 22°48′49″N 82°45′48″W
- Country: Cuba
- Capital: Artemisa
- Municipalities: Mariel, Guanajay, Caimito, Bauta, San Antonio de los Baños, Güira de Melena, Alquízar, Artemisa, Candelaria, San Cristóbal, Bahía Honda

Government
  - Governor: Ricardo Concepción Rodríguez
  - Vice-Governor: Yamina Duarte Duarte

Area
  - Total: 4,004.27 km^{2} (1,546.06 sq mi)
- Highest elevation: 681 m (2,234 ft)

Population (2010-12-31)
  - Total: 502,312
  - Density: 125.444/km^{2} (324.899/sq mi)
- Time zone: UTC−5 (EST)
- Area code: +53-47
- ISO 3166 code: CU-15
- HDI (2019): 0.797 high · 3rd of 16
- Website: www.artemisa.gob.cu/es/

Artemisa Province is one of the two new provinces created from the former La Habana Province, whose creation was approved by the Cuban National Assembly on August 1, 2010, the other being Mayabeque Province. The new provinces came into existence on January 1, 2011.

== Overview ==
Artemisa was the largest city and municipality of the former La Habana Province. The newly formed province combined the eight western municipalities of La Habana Province and three eastern municipalities of neighbor province Pinar del Río (Bahía Honda, Candelaria and San Cristóbal). The capital and largest city is Artemisa (47,000 pop. in 2015).

The new province is only larger than Havana city and Mayabeque, but with more population than four other Cuban provinces. It is the most densely populated, after Havana city and Santiago de Cuba.

The economy of the Artemisa province is based mainly on agriculture (fruits, potatoes, rice, vegetables, sugar cane) and industry of building materials (two cement factories), food processing industry and power plants. It contains the important port of Mariel in the northern coast. The province is also important in the military sector with the main Cuban Air Force base (San Antonio de los Baños) the Western base of the Cuban Navy (Cabañas Bay) and the Military Academy (College) "Antonio Maceo" in Caimito.

== Municipalities ==
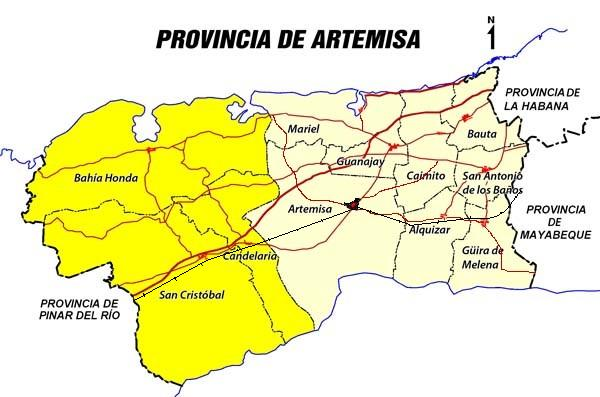
Map of Artemisa Province. Deep yellow color indicates former municipalities of Pinar del Río Province

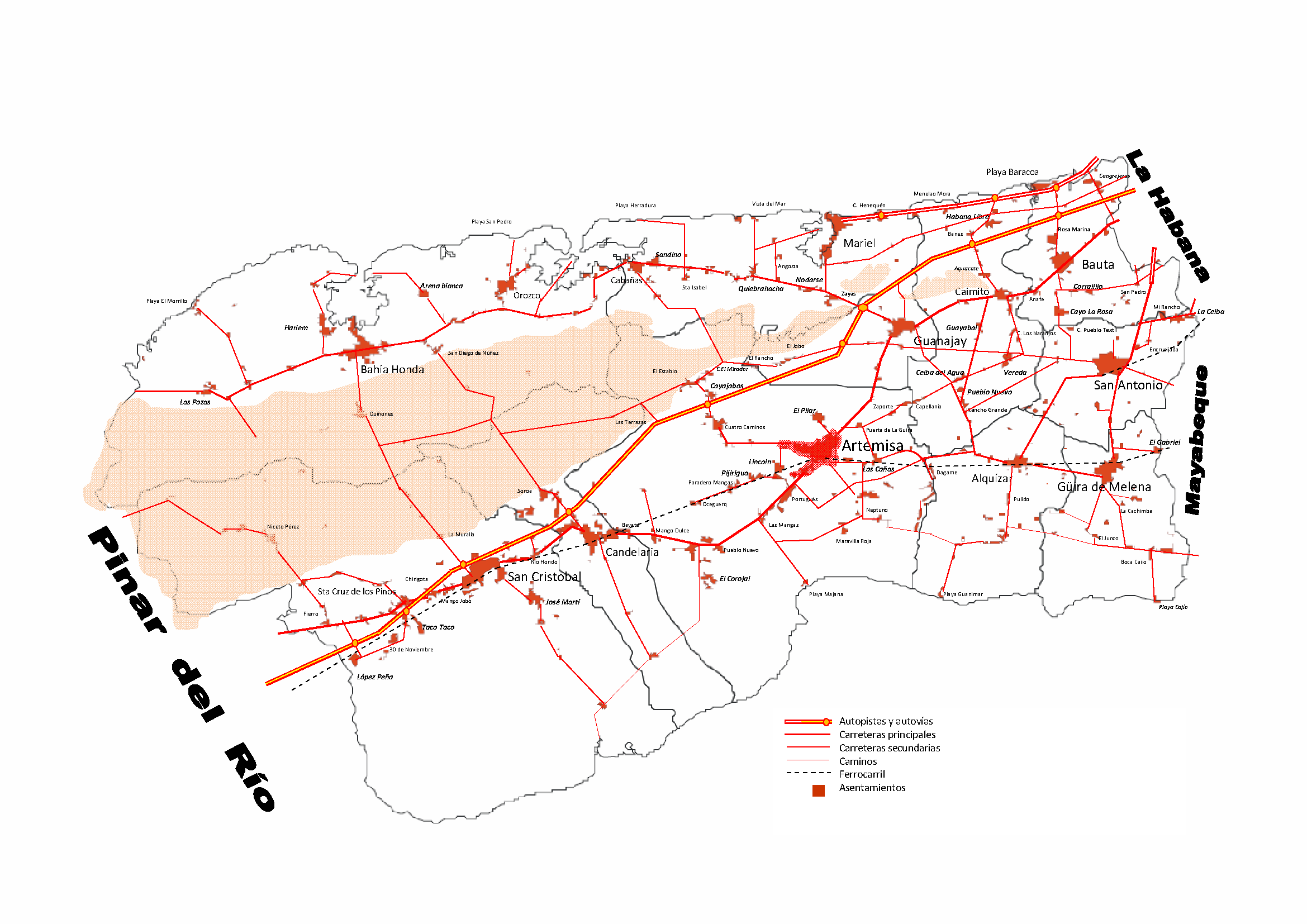
Road Map of Artemisa Province

Municipality	km^{2}	Population
Mariel	270.85	44,786
Guanajay	110.26	28,750
Caimito	239.4	39,304
Bauta	155.13	48,024
San Antonio de los Baños	126.37	49,942
Güira de Melena	199.22	39,821
Alquízar	194.36	32,501
Artemisa	688.7	82,917
Bahía Honda	784.14	45,124
Candelaria	301.42	20,283
San Cristóbal	934.4	70,940
Total	4,004.27	502,392

Source: Oficina Nacional de Estadísticas 2010

== Topography ==
The maximum elevation in the province is Guajaibon peak (700 meters), and is located near N 22 47' 19" W 83 21' 52" in Sierra del Rosario range.

== See also ==
- Guaniguanico
- Las Terrazas
- Sierra del Rosario
- Soroa
