= Provinces of Cuba =

Administrative divisions of Cuba
- Provinces of Cuba
- Category: Unitary state
- Location: Republic of Cuba
- Number: 15 provinces 1 special municipality
- Populations: 81,486 (Isla de la Juventud) – 2,130,517 (La Habana)
- Areas: 281.18 square miles (728.3 km^{2}) (La Habana) – 5,951.31 square miles (15,413.8 km^{2}) (Camagüey Province)
- Government: Single-party government
- Subdivisions: Municipality

Administratively, Cuba is divided into 15 provinces and one special municipality (the Isla de la Juventud). The current structure has been in place since August 2010, when the then-La Habana Province was divided into Artemisa Province and Mayabeque Province.

== List of provinces ==
From west to east, Cuba's provinces are:

1. Pinar del Río
2. Artemisa
3. La Habana
4. Mayabeque
5. Matanzas
6. Cienfuegos
7. Villa Clara
8. Sancti Spíritus
9. Ciego de Ávila
10. Camagüey
11. Las Tunas
12. Granma
13. Holguín
14. Santiago de Cuba
15. Guantánamo
16. Isla de la Juventud ("special municipality")

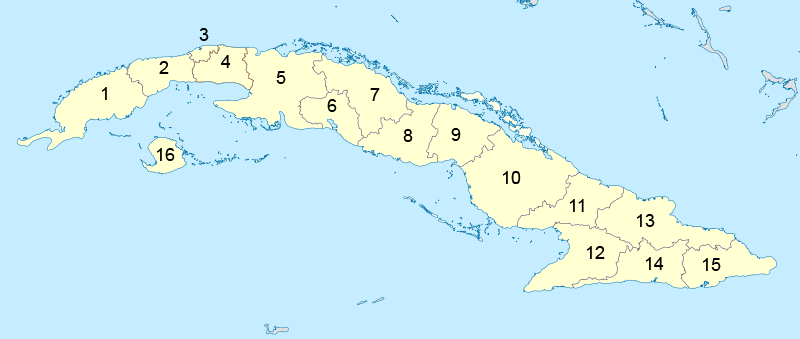

== List by population ==
Source: Cuba census 2002

Coat of arms	Province	Capital	Pop. (2012)	Pop. (%)	Area		Area (%)	Density	
Coat of arms	Province	Capital	Pop. (2012)	Pop. (%)	km^{2}	sq mi	Area (%)	per km^{2}	per sq mi
	Camagüey	Camagüey	768,311	7.02	15,386.16	5,940.63	13.2	50.22	130.1
	Ciego de Ávila	Ciego de Ávila	424,750	3.68	6,971.64	2,691.77	5.6	60.70	157.2
	Cienfuegos	Cienfuegos	400,768	3.54	4,188.61	1,617.23	3.9	94.54	244.9
	La Habana	La Habana (Havana)	2,154,454	19.70	728.26	281.18	0.7	3,053.49	7,908.5
	Granma	Bayamo	830,645	7.36	8,374.24	3,233.31	7.9	98.20	254.3
	Guantánamo	Guantánamo	506,369	4.54	6,167.97	2,381.47	6.0	82.22	212.9
	Holguín	Holguín	1,027,683	9.14	9,215.72	3,558.21	8.5	109.90	284.6
	Isla de la Juventud†	Nueva Gerona	84,263	0.77	2,419.27	934.09	2.1	35.78	92.7
	Artemisa	Artemisa	487,339	4.49	4,003.24	1,545.66	3.75	125.5	325
	Las Tunas	Las Tunas	525,729	4.70	6,592.66	2,545.44	6.0	79.77	206.6
	Matanzas	Matanzas	679,314	6.00	11,791.82	4,552.85	10.0	56.80	147.1
	Mayabeque	San José de las Lajas	371,198	3.41	3,743.81	1,445.49	3.49	102.2	265
	Pinar del Río	Pinar del Río	585,452	5.32	8,883.74	3,430.03	8.32	67.00	173.5
	Sancti Spíritus	Sancti Spíritus	462,114	4.12	6,777.28	2,616.72	6.3	68.33	177.0
	Santiago de Cuba	Santiago de Cuba	1,053,837	9.27	6,227.78	2,404.56	5.9	168.32	435.9
	Villa Clara	Santa Clara	783,708	7.31	8,441.81	3,259.40	7.6	97.17	251.7
	Cuba	La Habana	11,163,934		109,884.01	42,426.45		101.72	263.5

† Special municipality

== History ==
=== 1879–1976 ===
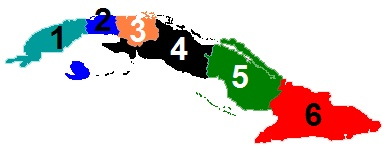
Cuba's provinces, 1879 to 1976

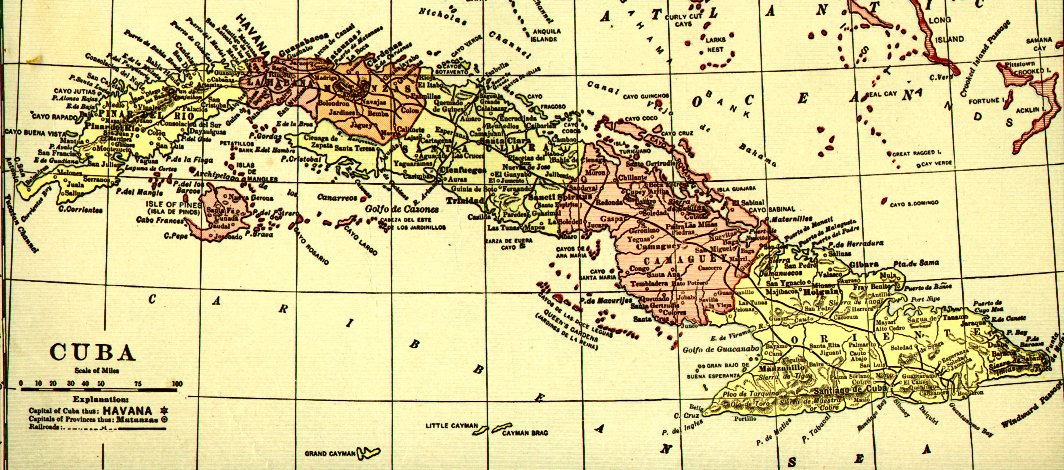
Cuba's provinces on a 1910s map

The provinces were created in 1879 by the Spanish colonial government. From 1879 to 1976, Cuba was divided into six provinces, which maintained with little changes the same boundaries and capital cities, although with modifications in official names. These "historical" provinces are the following (from west to east):

1. Pinar del Río
2. La Habana, included the city of Havana, current Mayabeque, some municipalities of current Artemisa Province (prior to 1970: 5 municipalities; from 1970 to 2011, 8 municipalities, including Artemisa city itself). Isla de Pinos ("Isle of Pines") was considered a "special municipality" in the province of La Habana.
3. Matanzas
4. Las Villas (before 1940 named "Santa Clara"), contained the present-day provinces of Cienfuegos, Villa Clara, Sancti Spíritus, and Southern Matanzas Province.
5. Camagüey (before 1899 named "Puerto Príncipe"), contained the present-day provinces of Camagüey and Ciego de Ávila, as well as two municipalities of current Las Tunas Province (prior to 1970).
6. Oriente (before 1905 named "Santiago de Cuba"), contained the present-day provinces of Las Tunas, Granma, Holguín, Santiago de Cuba and Guantánamo

=== 1976–2011 ===
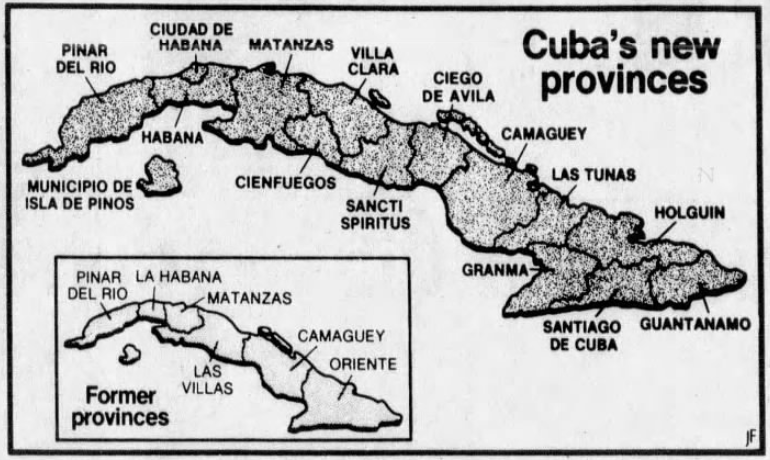
Cuba's provinces as of December 1976

In December 1976, the original six provinces were reconstituted into 14 provinces plus one special municipality:

1. Pinar del Río
2. La Habana
3. Ciudad de La Habana
4. Matanzas
5. Cienfuegos
6. Villa Clara
7. Sancti Spíritus
8. Ciego de Ávila
9. Camagüey
10. Las Tunas
11. Granma
12. Holguín
13. Santiago de Cuba
14. Guantánamo
15. Isla de Pinos ("special municipality")

Isla de Pinos was renamed Isla de la Juventud on 3 August 1978.

=== 2011–present ===
In August 2010, the Cuban National Assembly split the then-La Habana Province into two new provinces: Artemisa (which incorporated three eastern municipalities of neighboring Pinar del Río) and Mayabeque. The new provinces started functioning from 1 January 2011. Havana City Province (Ciudad de La Habana Province) recovered its original name, La Habana Province.

== Presidents of the People's Power Provincial Councils ==
The following are the presidents of the Provincial People's Councils in each province in the country (local governments).

The Provincial People's Councils replaced the Provincial Assemblies in the 2019 Constitution and are made up of provincial representatives elected by the municipal assemblies or councils.

Province	President of the Provincial Council
Camagüey	Jesús Arturo García Collazo
Ciego de Ávila	Agustín Gregorio Arza Pascual
Cienfuegos	Rolando Díaz González
La Habana	Reinaldo García Zapata
Granma	Jesús Antonio Infante López
Guantánamo	Luis Fernando Navarro Fernández
Holguín	Alberto Olivera Fis
Isla de la Juventud†	Roberto Unger Pérez
Mayabeque	Armando Cuellar Domínguez
Artemisa	Raúl Rodríguez Cartaya
Las Tunas	Víctor Luis Rodríguez Carballosa
Matanzas	Nilo Tomás Díaz Fundora
Pinar del Río	Vidal Pérez Baños
Sancti Spíritus	Fidel Pérez Luzbert
Santiago de Cuba	Rolando Yero García
Villa Clara	Alexander Rodriguez Rosada

† Special municipality

== See also ==
- List of cities in Cuba by population
- List of places in Cuba
- Municipalities of Cuba
- Politics of Cuba
- Demographics of Cuba
- List of West Indian first-level country subdivisions, a list of first-level country subdivisions within the Caribbean in order of total area
- ISO 3166-2:CU, which defines codes for the names of the principal subdivisions of the country
