= USCGC Barbara Mabrity =

Keeper-class coastal buoy tender of the United States Coast Guard

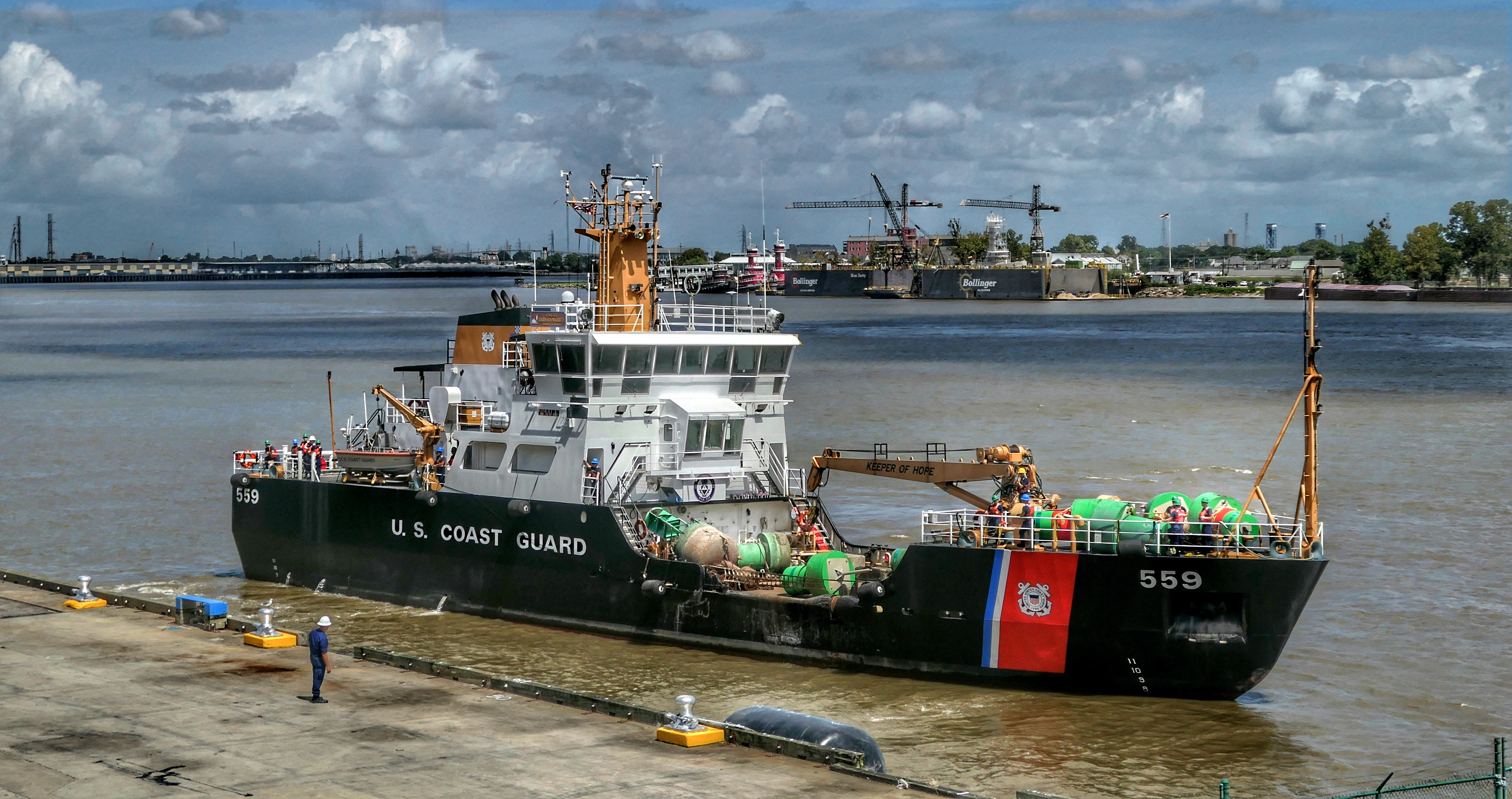
- USCGC Barbara Mabrity

History

United States
- Name: Barbara Mabrity
- Operator: US Coast Guard
- Builder: Marinette Marine Corporation
- Launched: 26 March 1999
- Commissioned: 20 November 1999
- Home port: Mobile, Alabama
- Identification: IMO number: 9177272; Call sign: NERA; MMSI number: 366968000
- Status: Active
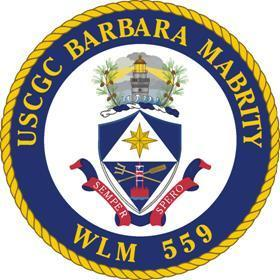
- Badge

General characteristics
- Type: Keeper-class buoy tender
- Displacement: 850 long tons (864 t) full load
- Length: 175 ft (53.3 m)
- Beam: 36 ft (11.0 m)
- Draft: 8 ft (2.4 m)
- Installed power: 2,000 hp (1,500 kW) sustained
- Propulsion: 2 × Caterpillar 3508 DITA Diesel engines; bow thruster, 500 hp (373 kW)
- Speed: 12 knots (22 km/h; 14 mph)
- Range: 2000 nautical miles at 10 kn
- Crew: 24 (2 Officers, 22 Enlisted)

USCGC Barbara Mabrity (WLM-559) is a Keeper-class coastal buoy tender of the United States Coast Guard. Launched in 1999, she is home-ported in Mobile, Alabama. Her primary mission is maintaining aids to navigation from western Florida to the Mississippi River. Secondary missions include marine environmental protection, search and rescue, and security. She is assigned to the Eighth Coast Guard District.

== Construction and characteristics ==
On 22 June 1993 the Coast Guard awarded the contract for the Keeper-class vessels to Marinette Marine Corporation in the form of a firm contract for the lead ship and options for thirteen more. The Coast Guard exercised options for the fifth through tenth ships, including Barbara Mabrity, in February of 1997. The ship was launched on 26 March 1999 into the Menominee River. Barbara Mabrity is the ninth of the fourteen Keeper-class ships built.

Her hull was built of welded steel plates. She is 175 feet (53 m) long, with a beam of 36 feet (11 m), and a full-load draft of 8 feet (2.4 m). Barbara Mabrity displaces 850 long tons fully loaded. Her gross register tonnage is 904, and her net register tonnage is 271. The top of the mast is 58.75 feet (17.91 m) above the waterline.

Rather than building the ship from the keel up as a single unit, Marinette Marine used a modular fabrication approach. Eight large modules, or "hull blocks" were built separately and then welded together.

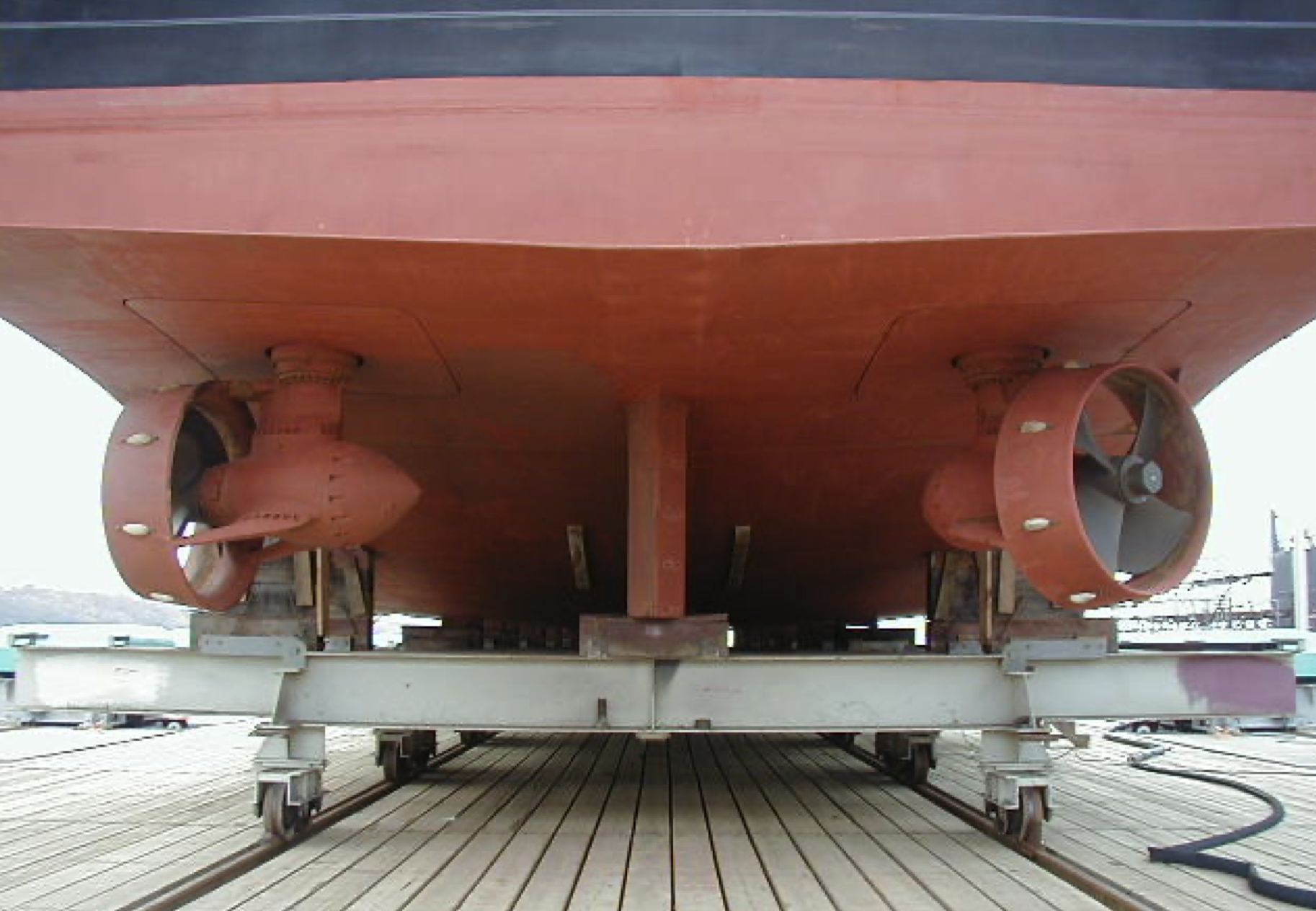
Z-drives on a Keeper-class ship

The ship has two Caterpillar 3508 DITA (direct-injection, turbocharged, aftercooled) 8-cylinder Diesel engines which produce 1000 horsepower each. These drive two Ulstein Z-drives. Keeper-class ships were the first Coast Guard cutters equipped with Z-drives, which markedly improved their maneuverability. The Z-drives have four-bladed propellers which are 57.1 inches (145 cm) in diameter and are equipped with Kort nozzles. They can be operated in "tiller mode" where the Z-drives turn in the same direction to steer the ship, or in "Z-conn mode" where the two Z-drives can turn in different directions to achieve specific maneuvering objectives. An implication of the Z-drives is that there is no reverse gear or rudder aboard Barbara Mabrity. To back the ship, the Z-drives are turned 180 degrees which drives the ship stern-first even though the propellers are spinning in the same direction as they do when the ship is moving forward. Her maximum speed is 12 knots. Her tanks can hold 16,385 gallons of diesel fuel which gives her an unrefueled range of 2,000 nautical miles at 10 knots.

She has a 500 horsepower bow thruster. The Z-drives and bow thruster can be linked in a Dynamic Positioning System. This gives Barbara Mabrity the ability to hold position in the water even in heavy currents, winds, and swells. This advanced capability is useful in bringing buoys aboard that can weigh more than 16,000 lbs.

Electrical power aboard is provided by three Caterpillar 3406 DITA generators which produce 285 Kw each. She also has a 210 kW emergency generator, which is a Caterpillar 3406 DIT.

The buoy deck has 1,335 square feet (124.0 m^{2}) of working area. A crane with a boom 42 feet (13 m) long lifts buoys and their mooring anchors onto the deck. The crane can lift up to 20,000 pounds (9,100 kg).

The ships' fresh water tanks can hold 7,339 gallons. She has three ballast tanks that can be filled to maintain her trim, and tanks for oily waste water, sewage, gray water, new lubrication oil, and waste oil.

Accommodations were designed for mixed gender crews from the start. Crew size and composition has varied over the years. When she was launched, her complement was 18, commanded by a chief warrant officer. She currently has a crew of 24.

Barbara Mabrity, as all Keeper-class ships, has a strengthened "ice belt" along the waterline so that she can work on aids to navigation in ice-infested waters. Not only is the hull plating in the ice belt thicker than the rest of the hull, but framing members are closer together in areas that experience greater loads when working in ice. Higher grades of steel were used for hull plating in the ice belt to prevent cracking in cold temperatures. Her bow is sloped so that rather than smashing into ice, she rides up over it to break it with the weight of the ship. Barbara Mabrity is capable of breaking flat, 9-inch thick ice at 3 knots.

The ship carries a cutter boat on davits. She was originally equipped with a CB-M boat which was replaced in the mid-2010s with a CB-ATON-M boat. This was built by Metal Shark Aluminum Boats and was estimated to cost $210,000. The boat is 18 feet (5.5 m) long and are equipped with a Mercury Marine inboard/outboard diesel engine.

The ship's namesake is lighthouse keeper Barbara Mabrity. She was the principal keeper of the Key West Lighthouse from 1832 to 1864. She succeeded her husband, Michael Mabrity, who died of yellow fever in 1832. During the 1846 Havana hurricane, the original lighthouse collapsed and twelve people, including five of Mabrity's six children were killed. Despite her loss, Mabrity continued her keeper duties at Key West until she was reported to have voiced Confederate sympathies and was fired at the age of 82. In September 1999 Barbara Mabrity stopped in Key West on her way to Mobile as a tribute to her namesake.

Barbara Mabrity replaced USCGC White Pine in Mobile.

== Operational history ==
The Coast Guard took ownership of Barbara Mabrity on 29 July 1999, and placed her "in commission, special" status. To reach her new home port she sailed from Lake Michigan through the Great Lakes, and out into the Atlantic. She was placed in full commission during a ceremony in Mobile on 20 November 1999. Rear Admiral Paul Paluta, commander of the 8th Coast Guard District was the featured speaker at the event.

Barbara Mabrity's buoy tending involves lifting them onto her deck where marine growth is scraped and pressure washed off, inspecting the buoy itself, and replacing lights, solar cells, and radar transponders. The mooring chain or synthetic cable is inspected and replaced as needed. The concrete block mooring anchor is also inspected. The Gulf Coast is prone to hurricanes which can damage, sink, and move buoys away from their charted positions. For example, Hurricane Ike moved or destroyed approximately ninety percent of the buoys it passed. In the wake of major hurricanes, Barbara Mabrity has been dispatched to survey and repair damage to buoys, and to reset those which have been moved off-station.

The bulk of Barbara Mabrity's year is spent at sea tending her buoys, or in port maintaining the ship. She has been asked to perform other missions, as described below.

=== Search and rescue ===
On her first day at sea, 13 August 1999, Barbara Mabrity was bound for Milwaukee from Marinette's shipyard where she was built. A sailboat lost its rudder in a storm and was disabled. As the nearest Coast Guard vessel, Barbara Mabrity was dispatched to the boat and rescued the six sailors aboard.

The tow vessel Natalie Jean capsized and sank on 12 March 2018 in the Mississippi River with three crew aboard. One was rescued quickly and Barbara Mabrity was dispatched with other Coast Guard assets to search for the other two. The search was unsuccessful.

The ship encountered a capsized vessel with two men hanging onto the side just southeast of St. George Island, Florida in April 2018. Barbara Mabrity was able to rescue the men. They were found to be suffering from severe sunburn and swelling of their lower extremities due to the 27 hours they had spent in the water. They were medevaced for emergency medical treatment by helicopter.

=== Marine environmental protection ===
On the day after Christmas 2000, the 800-foot long, fully laden tanker Westchester ran aground in the Mississippi River. Among the Coast Guard assets which were deployed to contain the resulting spill was Barbara Mabrity. She deployed the Vessel of Opportunity Skimming System to capture spilled oil.

=== Public engagement ===
The Coast Guard has offered tours of Barbara Mabrity on several occasions. These include:

- In Green Bay, Wisconsin in August 1999, shortly before she sailed for Mobile for the first time.
- In New Orleans in January 2000.
- In New Orleans at the 2007 Coast Guard Innovation Expo.

In 2009, 2011, 2013, 2015, 2020, and 2022 Barbara Mabrity delivered the Zulu leadership to downtown New Orleans to start the Lundi Gras festivities. Rear Admiral Mary Landry, commander of the 8th Coast Guard District, was aboard for the 2011 trip. Rear Admiral John Nadeau, commander of the 8th Coast Guard District, was aboard for the 2020 trip. Rear Admiral Richard Timme, commander of the 8th Coast Guard district, was aboard in 2022.
