= Aguacate, Cuba =

Former town near Havana, Cuba

Coordinates: 22.984°N 81.823°W

Aguacate is a community of about 5,000 people in the province of Mayabeque in Cuba. Until 1976 it was part of the former province of Havana. It was a town until 1973 when it became incorporated into the municipality of Madruga. As of January 1, 2011, the locality became part of the new Province of Mayabeque. Aguacate is also a station on the main line of the Cuban National Railway.

== History ==
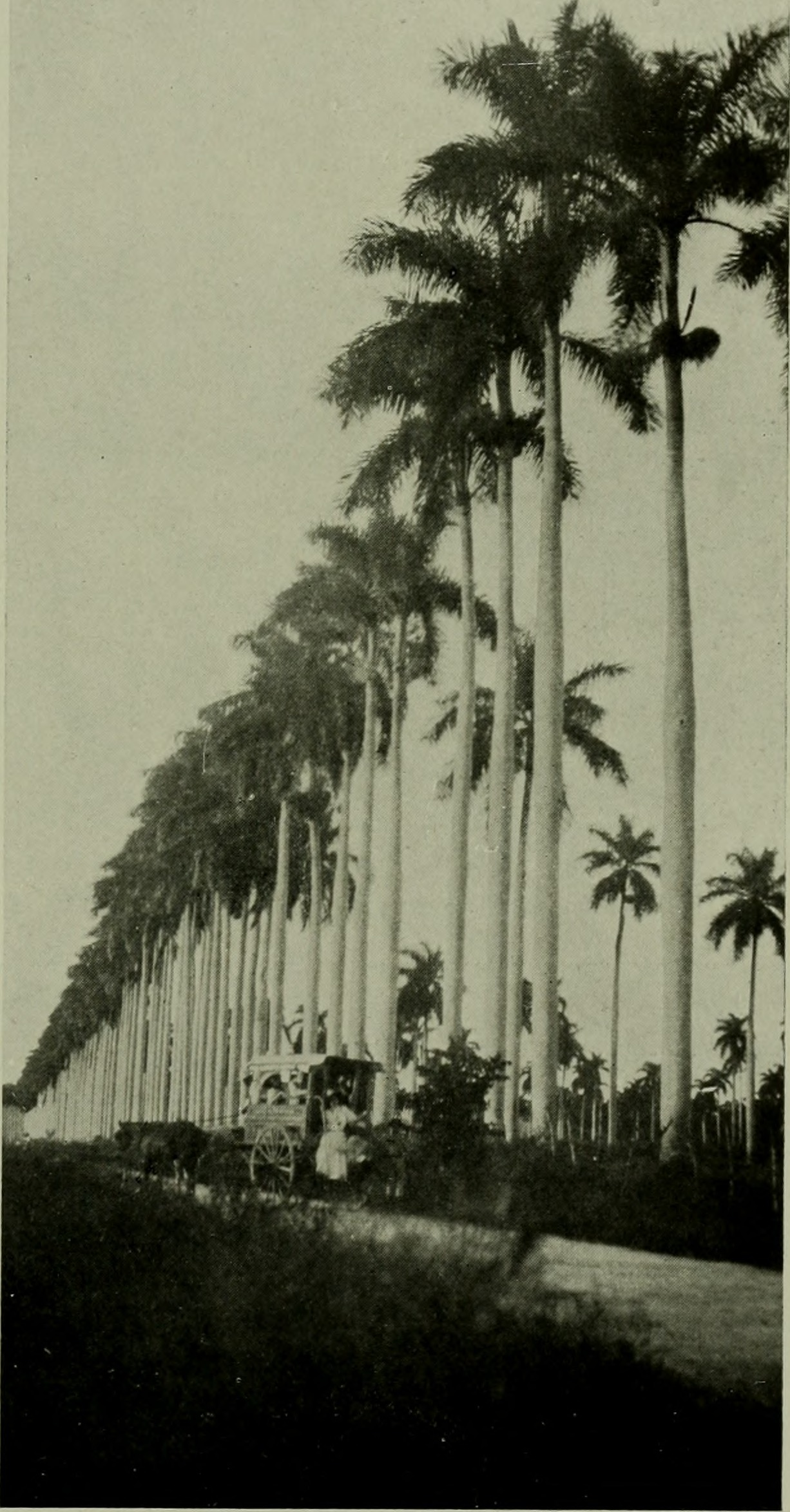
Royal palms near Aguacate, 1913, at a time when sugar plantations were an important part of the local economy

The town was founded in 1796 by some neighbors who settled in el corral de los Siete Príncipes. This community was divided in 1803. That same year the first church was constructed, being auxiliary of Jibacoa. Later an oratorio consecrated to Our Lady of the Carmen was constructed, replacing the first church. The community was severely damaged in the 1846 Havana hurricane. The municipal council dates from 1879. In 1919 Aguacate had a population of 2557 people, increasing to 2895 in 1931 and reaching 3324 in 1943. In 2002 it surpassed 5,000 inhabitants.

== Geography ==
Aguacate is located at kilometer 73 of the Central Highway between Havana and Santiago de Cuba, to which it is joined by a branch. By rail it is 30 kilometers from the city of Matanzas and 62 from Havana.

The chess master José Raúl Capablanca spent part of his childhood in this town.
