= Barbara Mabrity =

Barbara (Estacholy) Mabrity (1782–1867) was an American lighthouse keeper.

Barbara Mabrity was born in Florida, her father Francesco (Staccioli/Stacoli) Estacholy arrived from Italy as part of the 1768 Turnbull Venture to Florida. Barbara (Estacholy) Mabrity and her husband, Michael, were assigned to be the keepers of Key West Light in 1826. Michael died of yellow fever in 1832, at which point Barbara was formally appointed to take his place. She maintained the light through hurricanes which blew through the key in 1835, 1841, and 1842. On October 10, 1846 another heavy storm hit the island, causing several people, including Mabrity's six children, to take refuge in the lighthouse. However, the tower began to crumble, and the keeper only had time to grab one of her children and escape before it fell, killing those who remained inside. Mabrity continued to serve as keeper before being fired in 1864 for making statements against the Union during the American Civil War; she died three years later.

The United States Coast Guard named a coastal buoy tender, USCGC Barbara Mabrity, based in Mobile, Alabama in her honor.
