= 1846 Havana hurricane =

Atlantic hurricane in 1846

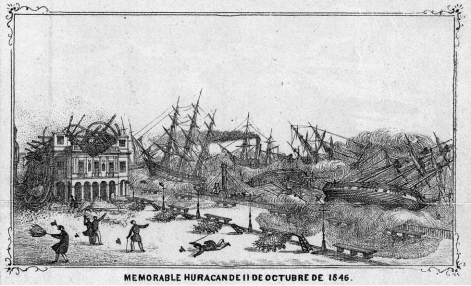
- Damage in Havana, Cuba, succeeding the hurricane

Meteorological history
- Formed: October 5, 1846
- Dissipated: October 14, 1846

Category 5 major hurricane
- 1-minute sustained (SSHWS/NWS)
- Highest winds: ≥160 mph (≥255 km/h) (unofficial)
- Lowest pressure: <938 mbar (hPa); <27.70 inHg

Overall effects
- Fatalities: At least 164 direct (Note: Several sources indicate drastically higher death tolls in Cuba.)
- Damage: $338,000 (1846 USD)
- Areas affected: Cayman Islands, Cuba, Florida, much of Eastern Seaboard and Atlantic Canada
- Part of the 1846 Atlantic hurricane season

The 1846 Havana hurricane (also known as the Great Havana hurricane of 1846, San Francisco de Borja hurricane and The Great Gale of 1846) was the most intense tropical cyclone in recorded history for 78 years and the first known Category 5-strength hurricane to strike Cuba. The first indications of the formation of a disturbance were first noted on October 5 in the Caribbean Sea, but little else was known until the storm approached Cuba on October 10. There, it brought extreme winds and the lowest known atmospheric pressure of the time – 938 millibars (27.7 inHg) – a record which remained unbroken until the development of a later cyclone in 1924. It soon curved toward Florida, where it maintained its intensity, continuing to rapidly hasten northward along the East Coast of the United States to New England. It entered an extratropical transition while situated over New York on October 13, producing intense Category 2-force winds and unusually little precipitation. Eventually, the gale dissipated over the Canadian Maritimes the following day as a markedly weaker storm.

In Cuba, the storm caused hundreds of deaths, capsized dozens of ships, obliterated buildings, uprooted trees, and ruined crops. Many towns were wholly destroyed or flattened and never recovered, while others disappeared entirely. Damage in the United States was considerably better-chronicled despite being less severe. In Key West, widespread destruction was noted, with 40 deaths, many vessels rendered unfit, and widespread structural damage, with several buildings swept off of their foundations and hundreds of others flattened. Few supplies arrived in the following days and relief efforts were gradual, with few resources within the town's vicinity. Along other sections of the Southeastern U.S. coast, copious rainfall and moderate winds impacted agriculture, shipping, and residences. As the storm tracked along the Middle-Atlantic coast, similar effects were reported: there, the gale inundated many areas, impeded communications, destroyed railroads and canals, and flattened structures. Despite extensive damage, only two deaths were recorded outside Cuba and Florida. Along its entire track, the hurricane caused $338,000 in losses and at least 164 deaths. (Note: All damage figures are in 1846 United States dollars (USD).) (Note: A concrete death total cannot be established due to the hurricane's historical nature; the figure used is one from a modern study, though unofficial sources indicate significantly higher totals.)

Unusual in many aspects, the 1846 Havana hurricane was the most intense of its time. Though atmospheric pressure readings in Cuba reached as low as 916 millibars (27.0 inHg), the meteorological historian Jose Fernandez-Partagás re-evaluated several possible pressure records, concluding that the cyclone's minimum pressure was likely closer to 938 millibars (27.7 inHg); even so, it maintained the title of having the lowest recorded pressure measurement until 1924, 78 years later. Although no reliable wind measurements were available at the time, a separate study also estimated that it produced Category 5-strength winds, making it the first known storm to strike Cuba at such an intensity. As a result of the tropical cyclone's extreme intensity, ecological and geographical features were permanently altered in many areas. Sand Key, which completely submerged during the course of the hurricane, wholly re-emerged by December of that year, albeit not in its original position; meanwhile, ecological damage remained evident for decades in Key West.

== Meteorological history ==
The hurricane's origins can be traced to the central Caribbean Sea on October 5. The following day, its passage south of Jamaica was observed, and soon later, the hurricane transited across the Cayman Islands, producing relatively high winds. During the late evening of October 10, winds began to increase on the island of Cuba, culminating the following morning; while the strongest winds were originally in the storm's northeastern sector, they were later noted in its northwest. Its eye presumably passed slightly east of Havana while maintaining an atmospheric pressure of 916 mbar (27.06 inHg). This was accompanied by Category 5-force winds on the modern-day Saffir–Simpson hurricane wind scale, defined as 1-minute maximum sustained winds of at least 157 mph (253 km/h). Despite the reading, a 1993 analysis by weather historian José Fernández-Partagás calculated a corrected sea-level pressure at 938 millibars (27.7 inHg); even so, the value maintained the hurricane as the most intense in recorded history. It arrived at Key West the morning of October 11, soon after its departure from Cuba, with undiminished intensity. The storm gradually meandered toward Tampa Bay, and eventually arrived on that afternoon of October 11, its effects persisting through the following morning. Winds, which initially swept northeasterly at force 4 during the early evening, veered toward the southeast and peaked at force 8 the following morning. Weather historian David Ludlum tracked the hurricane's path past Cedar Key, noting the disturbance's northeastward curve as it neared Jacksonville.

Advancing northward over land, the once-powerful hurricane weakened, with somewhat higher atmospheric pressures and winds of less severity reported at Charleston, South Carolina. Paralleling the coast while situated inland, it hastened quickly toward the north, swiftly passing through North Carolina and arriving in the Chesapeake Bay region by October 13. Southeasterly gusts persisted as the storm continued its northerly progression inland along the course of the East Coast of the United States. After reaching Washington, D.C., in the early morning, it arrived near New York City by sunrise, and transited across Boston during the afternoon of October 13. The storm likely underwent an extratropical transition by the time it arrived in New York state, elongating linearly east-to-west. The gale's winds swept toward the southeast with a brief hiatus in the early evening. As it neared New England, it produced little precipitation yet intense gusts, which peaked at force 9-strength in the vicinity of New Bedford, Massachusetts. The cyclone's diameter over New England, at its largest point, reached 120 mi (200 km), accompanied by Category 2-force winds. The system was last sighted on the morning of October 14, rapidly weakening as it meandered into the Canadian Maritimes.

== Impact ==
In Cuba, the hurricane's impact was extremely severe: the storm destroyed nearly a hundred ships and likely killed hundreds of individuals across the island, and also inflicted extensive crop damage and widespread flooding. The hurricane capsized nearly all crafts docked at Havana Harbor, and of the 104 boats in the harbor prior to the storm's arrival, only 12 remained after it subsided. Between 40 and 50 other cargo vessels were impaired, with significant structural damage in the city proper also observed. Damage to houses, crops, and shipping was catastrophic throughout the island; the storm was reportedly the worst in Cuban history at the time, more severe even than an earlier hurricane in 1844. Waves were high enough to reach the lanterns of the Morro Castle lighthouse. While no concrete death toll was established, reports indicated the deaths of several dozen individuals during the entire course of the storm, while other records noted that hundreds of deaths had possibly occurred across the island.

Damage in the United States, however, was better-documented. There, the disturbance washed away the island of Sand Key and resulted in the loss of many vessels in nearby Key West harbor. Its storm surge scattered debris throughout the city and swept many structures afloat upon high waters. In all, approximately $200,000 in damage and 40 deaths were reported, representing four percent of the town's population. Elsewhere in the state, damage remained severe, with abnormal storm tides and widespread property destruction noted. Shipping and agriculture took the brunt of the storm's impact in other southeastern states; there, it produced damage similar to that inflicted by an earlier 1824 hurricane. Even farther north along the Middle-Atlantic coast, copious rainfall and intense gusts were observed, especially in the New England region. Winds uprooted trees, cracked canals, damaged railroads, and demolished factories. Rainfall totals, however, were generally low, indicative of a dry gale. In all, the hurricane caused at least 164 deaths and $338,000 (1846 USD) in damage throughout its path, (Note: Damage totals as follows: Fort Zachary Taylor endured $200,000 in damage at Key West, the $16,000 vessel Exchange was capsized, the $10,000 boat Commissary was sunk, the $45,000 ship Iris was grounded, the $22,000 craft Eben Preble was beached, the $5,000 vessel La Reunion was driven ashore, the $20,000 ship Villanueva was run aground, and the $20,000 boat Navigator was beached.) although some reports indicated hundreds of additional deaths across the island of Cuba.

=== Caribbean Sea ===
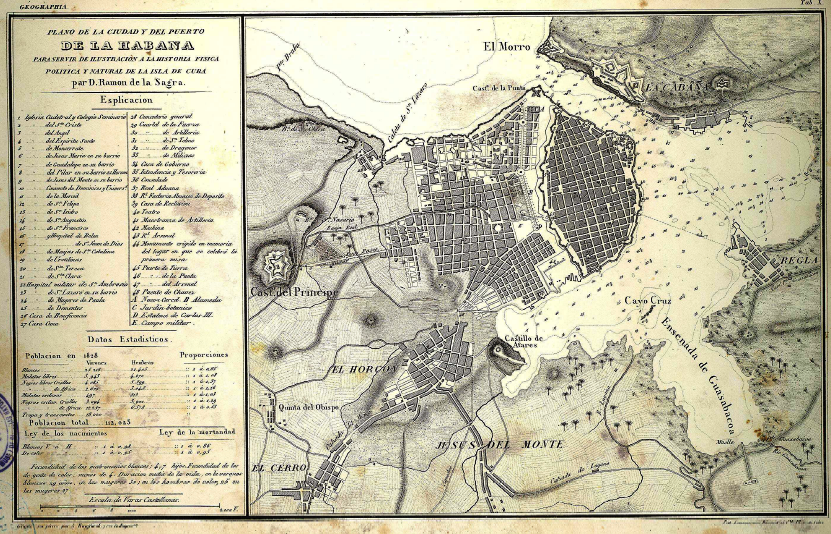
A map of the Havana area drawn in 1842

Early in its development, the hurricane passed near the Cayman Islands, inundating all of Grand Cayman, with its worst effects concentrated at the localities of Savannah and Newlands, both under a 15 ft (4.6 m) storm surge. Although residential damage was minimal, many grasslands were destroyed.

Celebrations coinciding with the birthday of Isabella II of Spain held in Havana, Cuba, on October 10 were disrupted by heavy rains and strong winds, indicative of the hurricane's imminent arrival that evening. Following the storm's landfall, the most severe damage as a result of the storm was observed from eastern regions of Pinar del Río to western Matanzas. Already soaked by weeks of constant rainfall, with swollen rivers, inundated roads, and spoiled tobacco crops, existing problems were only further exacerbated; at Paso Real de San Diego, cassava, sweet potato, and other vianda harvests were ruined. In Havana proper, 30 feet (9.1 m) waves battered ships seeking refuge in the city's harbor, grounded, driven away, capsized, and smashed, with much of their cargo, composing of cartons of sugar, bales of tobacco, and fragments of hemp, barrels, and cases strewn along the shore and sea. In all, the gale destroyed or seriously damaged 105 commercial ships, 70 sloops, pilot boats, and military craft, as well as 111 other vessels at sea; as a result, shortages of many essential goods occurred in inland provinces. Damage in Cuban port cities was only further aggravated by the amount of debris produced by the destruction of ships, warehouses, and docks, which were in turn blown into harborside structures by powerful gusts.

Masonry buildings bore the brunt of the storm, with the recently overhauled Teatro Principal wholly obliterated, the city gas plant rendered unusable after its smokestack crumpled, and numerous churches flattened. Havana Cathedral experienced considerable damage to its roof, while the Montserrat Church was completely unroofed. The hurricane destroyed parish churches at Jesus del Monte and Guanabacoa, while several hospitals, including the Real Hospital de San Lázaro, were also demolished, with its entrance wrecked, several wards and its infirmary building damaged, and its roofs crippled. Damage was so severe that some believed that the destruction was wrought by an earthquake. Residential damage was omnipresent, with 1,275 houses razed to the ground and another 1,040 damaged in Guanabacoa alone. The storm covered streets with planks, tiles, and other debris, uprooted and defoliated palm trees, ruined gardens, and damaged balconies. The massive storm surge associated with the system annihilated and washed away most of the huts and houses of Batabanó, with only 20 left standing. Food and water supplies were lost, while the retreating tides left behind inches of mud and mounds of debris in their wake.

At Caimito and Rosario, warehouses, their contents, piers, and wharves were all driven out into the neighboring ocean, and both towns were entirely flattened. The hurricane destroyed all the piers and nearly every building in Cabañas, and of the 23 houses built in Cojimar, only seven weathered the storm. A majority of ships at Matanzas were destroyed, with numerous ships capsized or washed aground. Massive waves crashed ashore, crushing buildings and inundating low-lying areas in the city. Many wooden and stone buildings, already impaired by an earlier hurricane in 1844, were immediately destroyed by the surge's impact. Structures along the shoreline, in addition to towns along the courses of the Yumurí and San Juan rivers, were driven out to sea. More than forty deaths occurred in the first round of flooding brought by the storm. At Güines, the tempest wrecked all of the town's residences, public buildings, and businesses, and over a hundred individuals died. Among the losses were two distilleries, a packing plant, a lumbermill, and a warehouse, and countless other buildings, while at Pinar del Río, flooding along mountainsides and nearby rivers swamped the city and other nearby communities.

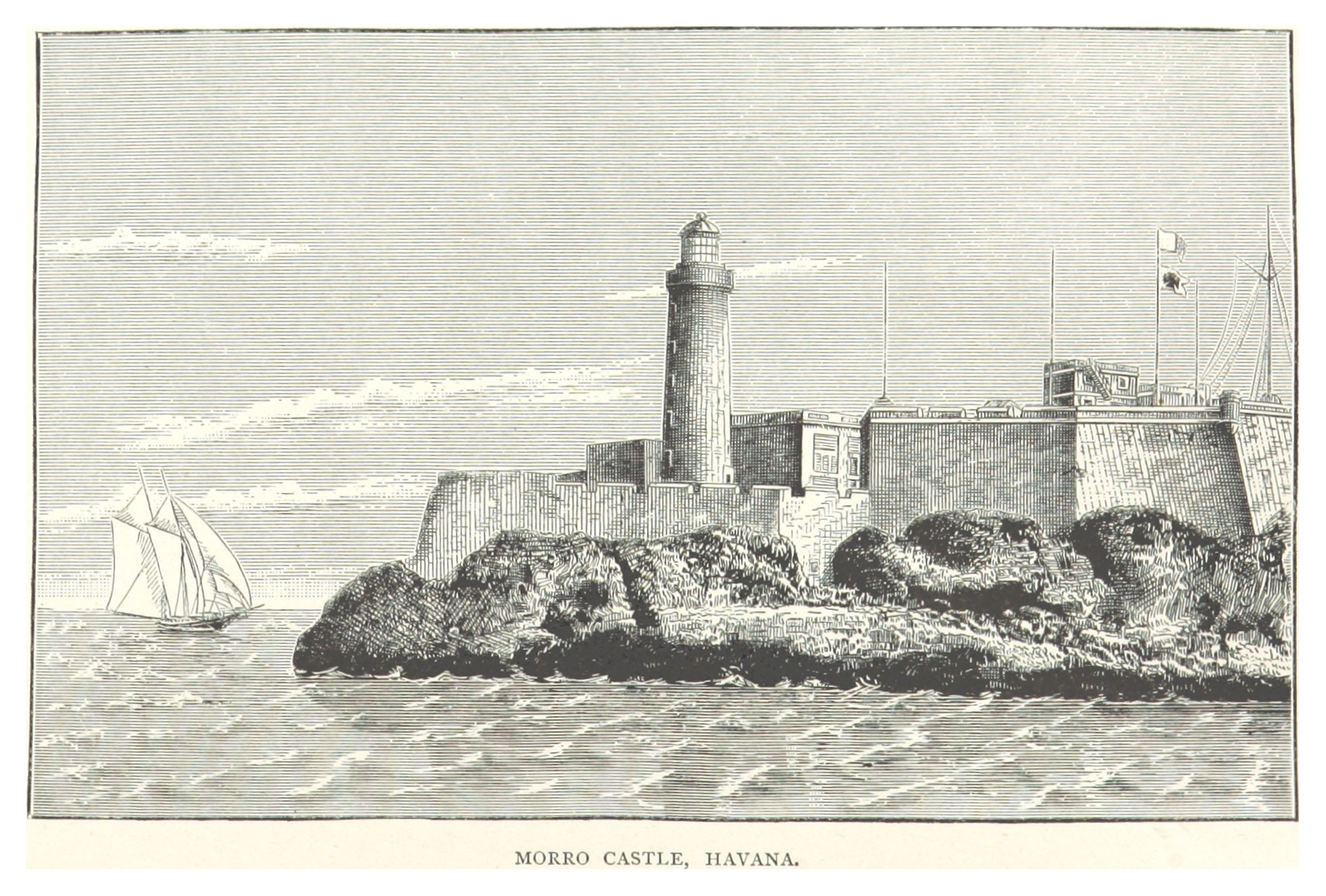
The Morro Castle lighthouse

Not a single residence remained undamaged after the hurricane's passage in Bejucal, San Antonio de los Baños, Santiago de Las Vegas, and Mariel, and those that were not destroyed were unroofed. Nueva Paz suffered the loss of 110 homes, while Madruga lost 100; only five remained standing at Managua, and of the eight left at Quivicán, all were severely damaged. At Jibacoa, only 32 of the town's 82 residences survived the storm. The seaside town of Guanabo was entirely lost, with floodwaters driving the town to sea and leaving its residents homeless. The hamlets of Mantilla, La Chorrera, and Paula disappeared entirely, while Candelaria was washed away with the loss of all its structures, of which a majority collapsed under the strength of the storm's powerful winds before being driven out to sea. Most structures in Cayajabos, Boyeros, and Aguacate were flattened, while the villages of Alquízar, Güira de Melena, and Vereda Nueva essentially vanished after the storm passed through. Guatao was entirely destroyed, suffering the loss of its apparently indestructible church, while Quemado wholly vanished and only four houses endured the storm's impacts at San Antonio de los Baños.

=== Southeastern United States ===
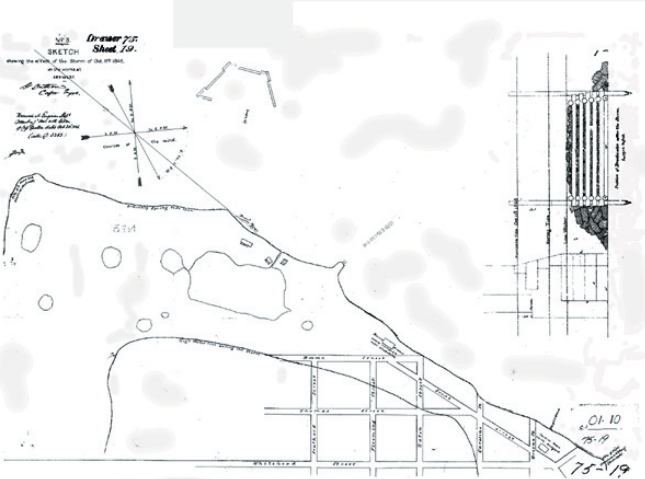
Map depicting the extent of the hurricane's damage in Key West.

The impacts of the hurricane were extreme throughout the state of Florida, especially in the Florida Keys. High winds washed away two lighthouses near Key West, resulting in the deaths of all 6 people at Sand Key Light and 14 individuals at the Key West Lighthouse; although keeper Barbara Mabrity survived, seven of her children died while taking refuge there during the hurricane. The 5 ft (1.5 m)-storm surge in Key West proper swept through downtown and forced many to abandon their homes; many attempted to flee to higher ground ("the highest piece of land – seventeen feet high, with waves threatening to push them off") but were still killed or injured. All wharves and warehouses in the town suffered some degree of damage, and of the approximately six hundred residences on the key, only six endured the storm's fury successfully, with the others unroofed or flattened by intense winds. Fort Zachary Taylor, partially obliterated by the hurricane, endured over $200,000 in damage, while the nearby customs-house was also harmed. Uprooted trees and debris from destroyed houses rendered roads impassable. The storm also changed the landscape within the vicinity, washing away Sand Key entirety. However, the island quickly resurfaced by that December, albeit 50 ft (15 m) west of its original position. Every vessel at local harbor sustained serious damage; in addition, some 20 vessels were unaccounted for, and at least 40 deaths were documented, though another source suggested 50 people died out at sea. An additional twelve died inland as a result death by being impaled, crushed, or drowned.

Powerful winds and the storm's massive flood tide washed lumber and casks aboard ships. Massive pieces of timber, hurled across town, cracked walls and inflicted significant damage. Floodwaters 3 ft (0.91 m) deep submerged already debris-clogged streets, with inundation as deep as 7.5 ft (2.3 m) in the key's northeastern sector. There, the Lafayette Salt Company was swept away along with two military cemeteries. Floodwaters exhumed many skeletons and coffins in those graveyards, dispersing them across local forests. In downtown, both the Episcopal and Methodist chapels collapsed, and warehouses were moderately damaged. The town's new stone marine hospital, struck by the remnants of a wharf and a large raft, was nearly completely destroyed by the storm's intense winds. Lumber, crowbars, and cannon carriages from the construction site of Fort Zachary Taylor were scattered throughout the streets. High waters floated a camp stable 200 ft (61 m) from its initial location, floating its horses and mules to safety. Four drowning deaths were chronicled at the fort, all having been swept away from the fort. Several wooden buildings along the shoreline, not tethered to the ground, drifted out to sea upon high waters due to the sheer force of the hurricane's gusts. Other notable maritime losses were also noted nearby, with the deaths of three on the Lafayette, which capsized offshore, one fatality each upon the Exchange and Frankford, and 19 casualties on the Villa Nueva; in addition, several other abandoned vessels were driven aground, apparently without any loss of life.

The storm's path of devastation extended northward through the state. In Manatee County, a plantation owner and his horse drowned attempting to cross the elevated waters of the Little Manatee River. To the north at Fort Brooke, high winds felled several oak trees on the grounds of a local military installation, wholly uprooting several others. Along Tampa Bay, winds obliterated several houses and flattened fences. To the northeast at Jacksonville, the storm was more severe, with the hurricane's winds having been "beyond anything in the recollection of ... the oldest inhabitant [of the town]." Storm tides exceeded the previously recorded high water mark by 6 ft (1.8 m), inundating numerous wharves and businesses along the path of Bay Street. By the time the storm's fury abated, the storm tossed wharves out to sea, wrecked structures along the St. Johns River, and rendered nearby saw mills' lumber worthless.

Even along other, farther north, portions of the southeastern coast, the gale remained intense. At Savannah, Georgia, one fatality occurred at sea, and damage to fences, roofs, and trees was minor despite high winds, with debris from the remnants of chinaberry trees littering the streets of the city. A schooner capsized at Union Wharf, and farther down the coast at Tybee Island, another craft was washed aground. Within the vicinity of Darien, Georgia, the gale's high tides swamped rice fields, also impeding the impending harvest along the Savannah River in South Carolina. Although little rain fell farther north at Charleston, with merely 2.03 in (5.2 cm) measured, gusts leveled wharves, uprooted trees, prostrated fences, and unroofed buildings. Despite copious rainfall measurements at Columbia, which received 4.50 in (11.4 cm) of rainfall, damage was minimal and, for the most part, restricted to crops. The vessel Mutual Safety departed Charleston in the mid-afternoon of October 10, but soon encountered the storm and experienced severe damage. In an effort to save the vessel's passengers, it was deliberately run ashore near Jacksonville, Florida, without the loss of any passengers on board; however, the steamer itself was not salvageable. A dozen ships beached or capsized in Charleston's harbors, with many wharves demolished along the city's shoreline. The western part of Tradd Street, especially near Chisolm's Mill and South Bay's sidewalk, eroded as a result of wind and water, which also fractured the South Bay and East Battery walls. Gusts unroofed the Trinity Church along Hasell Street; the roof itself landed in an adjacent graveyard. Despite extensive damage, only one death was noted in the city, that of a slave whose boat floundered at sea. Unexpectedly low storm tides of 2 ft (24 in) at Georgetown, South Carolina and Wilmington, North Carolina inflicted no noteworthy damage. In general, however, the hurricane was reportedly the most severe since 1824 along the southeastern seaboard.

=== Mid-Atlantic and Northeast ===
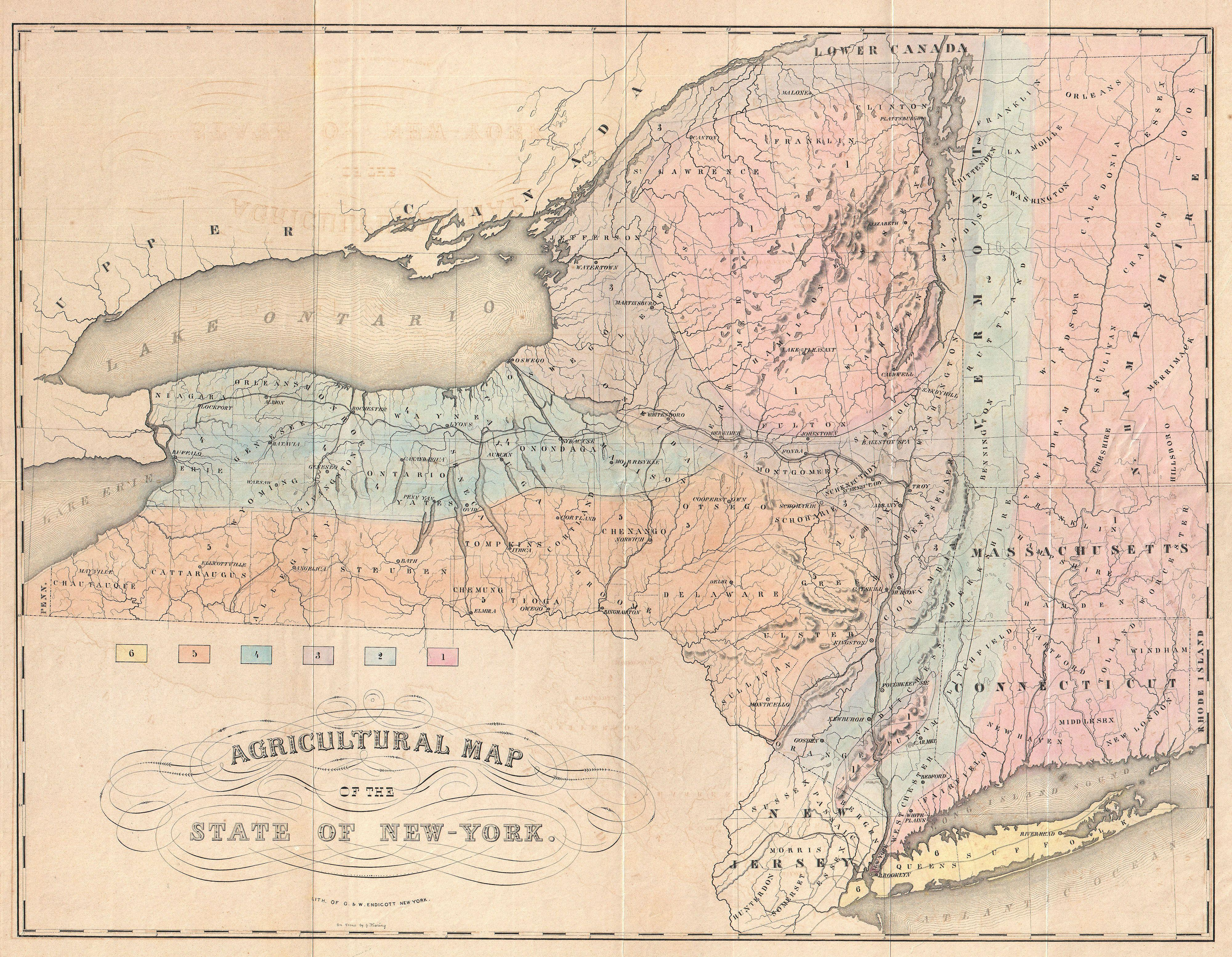
Map of New York and portions of New England at the time of the hurricane

Not a single wharf at Baltimore, Maryland escaped the hurricane's storm surge, which inundated the length of Pratt Street along the shore; meanwhile, the Potomac River at Washington, D.C., and Alexandria, Virginia, attained its highest level in 20 years, with the latter two cities plagued by surface runoff on October 13, following the storm's passage. The Chesapeake and Ohio Canal also bore the brunt of the storm's impact, having been swamped by potent rainfall as well. Low-lying areas along the Delaware River, including New Castle, Delaware, experienced storm tides not seen since the 1775 Newfoundland hurricane. The floodwaters were high enough to even extinguish a fire in a stationary locomotive which had been impeded by the gale's rainfall. The local Episcopal Church's steeple was tossed away by forceful gusts. To the north at Philadelphia, the tempest was the most intense in 30 years, with its high tides engulfing every wharf in the city; a total of 1.25 in (3.2 cm) of rain was measured at Pennsylvania Hospital. Despite widespread destruction along the Delaware River, damage to buildings in Philadelphia proper was less severe. Heavy rainfall was also generated throughout western portions of the state. In neighboring New Jersey, considerable damage to structures, timber, land, and livestock was observed, with winds toppling several buildings and trees; widespread rainfall, meanwhile, flooded salt marshes, also drowning cattle and sheep. High winds tangled poles and wires, in turn interrupting telegraphic communications along the Washington-Baltimore-New York corridor.

Damage was similarly severe in New England, despite the storm's transition into a weaker extratropical cyclone. Despite being significantly farther east from New York City, the storm produced severe impacts in the area. Significant damage was observed, with the waters of Upper New York Bay crashing over the Battery Park sea wall, washing away 300 ft (91 m) of its length. Gusts caved in chimneys, uprooted trees, and sank several canal boats at the city's wharves. At Buffalo, a rupture along the Erie Canal interrupted nearby traffic, and to the east in Dansville, copious rainfall was also recorded. Approximately 1.25 in (3.2 cm) of rain accompanied low atmospheric pressure readings throughout a wide area, with winds along the gale's eastern fringes, especially at Cape Cod, Massachusetts, remaining intense. In New England, it was generally considered to be the most severe storm since a previous disturbance in October 1841, despite having produced minimal rainfall totals throughout the region, including 0.33 in (0.84 cm) at New Bedford. Gusts felled trees paralleling both sides of a roadway from Springfield to Amherst. Nearby at Worcester, winds flattened several factories, and also overturned a substantial number trees in the outskirts of Boston. A newly built brick residence's walls in the southern end of the city collapsed; on the other side of the city, a sawing and planing mill was razed to the ground.

Within the proximity of Boston at the towns of Canton and Southborough, winds obliterated two factories. High winds at Grafton collapsed the railroad sheds under the ownership of the Providence and Worcester Railroad. Malden endured the loss of a mansion which was still under construction, and several smaller buildings were also blown down there and at Monson. Winds upturned trees and toppled fences at Northampton, and nearby at Palmer, a school building was crumbled into pieces by intense winds. At Springfield, winds unroofed a repair facility at a local railroad depot and a house at the town armory. Gusts destroyed railroad sheds and factories in Stoughton and Worcester as well, and at Wilmington, winds crumbled a house into pieces. Slightly to the south in Norwich, Connecticut, fallen trees obstructed railroad tracks, and at Hartford, a railroad bridge was thrown farther upstream along the Connecticut River. Further railroad damage was noted to property owned by the Winchester and Potomac, Baltimore and Ohio, and other railroads throughout the region. Nearly all key bridges managed by those railroads were washed away, with many other track segments covered in debris. In all, the hurricane caused at least 164 deaths.

== Aftermath and records ==
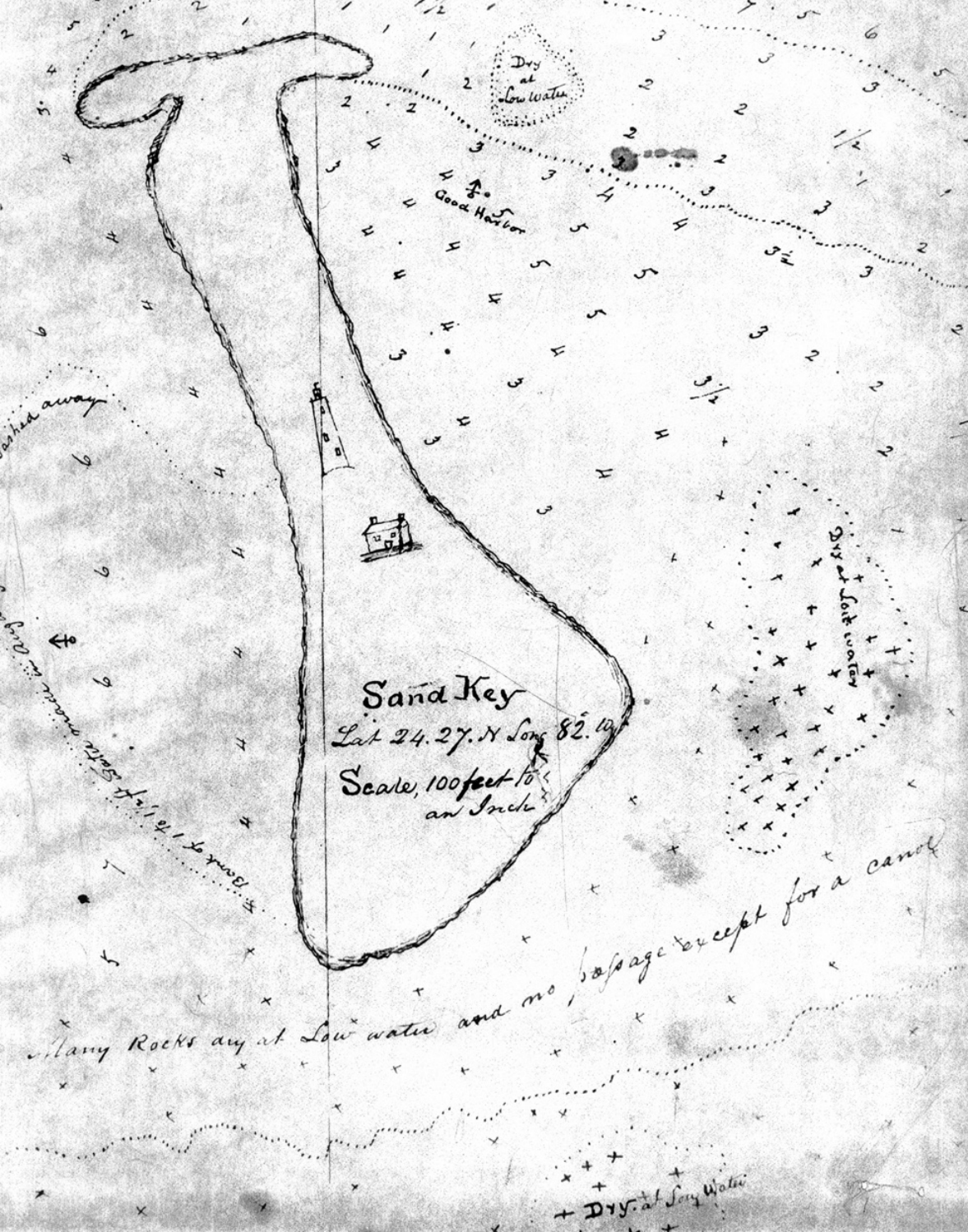
Map of Sand Key, Florida prior to the 1846 hurricane

Immediately following the storm's end, the U.S. Army Quartermaster permitted homeless citizens to rest in its local barracks. Food, water, and supplies were lacking, with most having been washed away, rendered unusable, or become inedible due to the storm's salty storm surge. The Morris's captain obtained supplies from a damaged vessel, sending them to a local Methodist minister. Efforts to reconstruct and recover from the disaster were not immediate due to the lack of available resources. With the loss of area lighthouses, local waters were difficult to navigate, with one shipwreck occurring as a result west of Key West; in response, a 60 ft (18 m) staff was placed at the former location of the now-destroyed Key West Lighthouse. Many vessels were also lost near Sand Key Light, and decades later, the tower, poorly maintained due to a lack of government funding, continued to deteriorate.

The 1846 hurricane resulted in a variety of both geological, geographical, and ecological alterations. In Key West, the local salt pond shifted from its original position, becoming a hindrance to local residents and requiring it to be filled up; eventually, the tourist district of Key West emerged over the former site of the salt pond. By December 1846, Sand Key, which was inundated during the hurricane, resurfaced from the waters of the Atlantic. However, it was situated approximately 50 ft (15 m) west of its location prior to the hurricane, and even months later, the lighthouse remained under 2 ft (0.61 m) of seawater. Years afterward, greenery on the key was sparse, and little native vegetation existed. Signs of ecological damage remained even in the early 1880s, evidenced by the presence of rushes among the leaves of trees and bushes.

The 1846 Havana hurricane was likely of Category 5 intensity, the earliest known tropical cyclone of its strength to strike Cuba. In 1993, the weather historian Jose Fernandez-Partagás analyzed an anomalous atmospheric pressure of 916 mbar (27.06 inHg) measured at Havana upon the vessel Thames, deeming it to be abnormally low and evaluating its true value to be closer to 938 millibars (27.7 inHg), making the hurricane the most intense in recorded history at the time. The exceptionally low pressure reading in Cuba surpassed a previous record of 948 millibars (28.0 inHg) set by an 1844 storm, with the new record eventually exceeded by the 1924 Cuba hurricane, which featured a manually recorded pressure reading of 932 millibars (27.5 inHg). (Note: Although the 1910 Cuba hurricane also exceeded the record and the 1924 Cuba hurricane each had lower pressures in the HURDAT database, those pressure measurements were estimated. For the purposes of this article, all pressure records are not estimated.)

== See also ==
- List of Florida hurricanes (pre-1900)
- List of New England hurricanes

== Notes ==
=== References ===
- Barnes, Jay (2007). Florida's hurricane history. Chapel Hill, North Carolina: University of North Press. ISBN 978-0-8078-5809-7.
- Boose, Emery R.; Chamberlin, Kristen E.; Foster, David R. (2001). "Landscape and Regional Impacts of Hurricanes in New England" (PDF). Ecological Monographs. 71 (1): 27–48. doi:10.1890/0012-9615(2001)071[0027:LARIOH]2.0.CO;2. S2CID 9369240. Archived from the original (PDF) on September 29, 2015.
- Chenoweth, Michael (2006). "A Reassessment of Historical Atlantic Basin Tropical Cyclone Activity, 1700–1855" (PDF). Climatic Change. 76 (1–2): 169–240. Bibcode:2006ClCh...76..169C. doi:10.1007/s10584-005-9005-2. S2CID 154932650.
- De Wire, Elinor (1995). Guardians of the Lights. Sarasota, Florida: Pineapple Press. ISBN 978-1-56164-077-5.
- Fraser, Walter J. Jr. (2009). Lowcountry Hurricanes. Athens, Georgia: University of Georgia Press. ISBN 978-0-8203-2866-9.
- Landsea, Christopher W.; Feuer, Steve; Hagen, Andrew; Glenn, David A.; Sims, Jamese; Perez, Ramon; Chenoweth, Michael; Anderson, Nicholas (2012). "A Reanalysis of the 1921–30 Atlantic Hurricane Database" (PDF). Journal of Climate. 25 (3): 865–885. Bibcode:2012JCli...25..865L. doi:10.1175/JCLI-D-11-00026.1.
- Ludlum, David McWilliams (1963). Early American hurricanes, 1492–1870. Boston, Massachusetts: American Meteorological Society. ISBN 978-0-933876-16-3.
- Malcolm, Corey (2010). "Understanding the Key West Hurricane of 1846" (PDF). Florida Keys Sea Heritage Journal. 20 (4). Key West, Florida: Key West Maritime Historical Society: 1–14.
- Partagás, Jose Fernandez (1993). Impact on Hurricane History of a Revised Lowest Pressure at Havana (Cuba) During the October 11, 1846 Hurricane (PDF) (Report). Coral Gables, Florida: unpublished.
- Pérez, Louis A. (2001). Winds of Change. Chapel Hill, North Carolina: University of North Carolina Press. ISBN 978-0-8078-4928-6.
- Schwartz, Rick (2007). Hurricanes and the Middle Atlantic States. Alexandria, Virginia: Blue Diamond Books. ISBN 978-0-9786280-0-0.
- Singer, Steven D. (1998). Shipwrecks of Florida. Sarasota, Florida: Pineapple Press. ISBN 978-1-56164-163-5.
- Tannehill, Ivan Ray (1938). Hurricanes: their nature and history. Princeton, New Jersey: Princeton University Press.
- Williams, Neville (1992). A history of the Cayman Islands (Report). George Town, Cayman Islands: Government of the Cayman Islands.
