= Key West Lighthouse =

Lighthouse in Florida, US

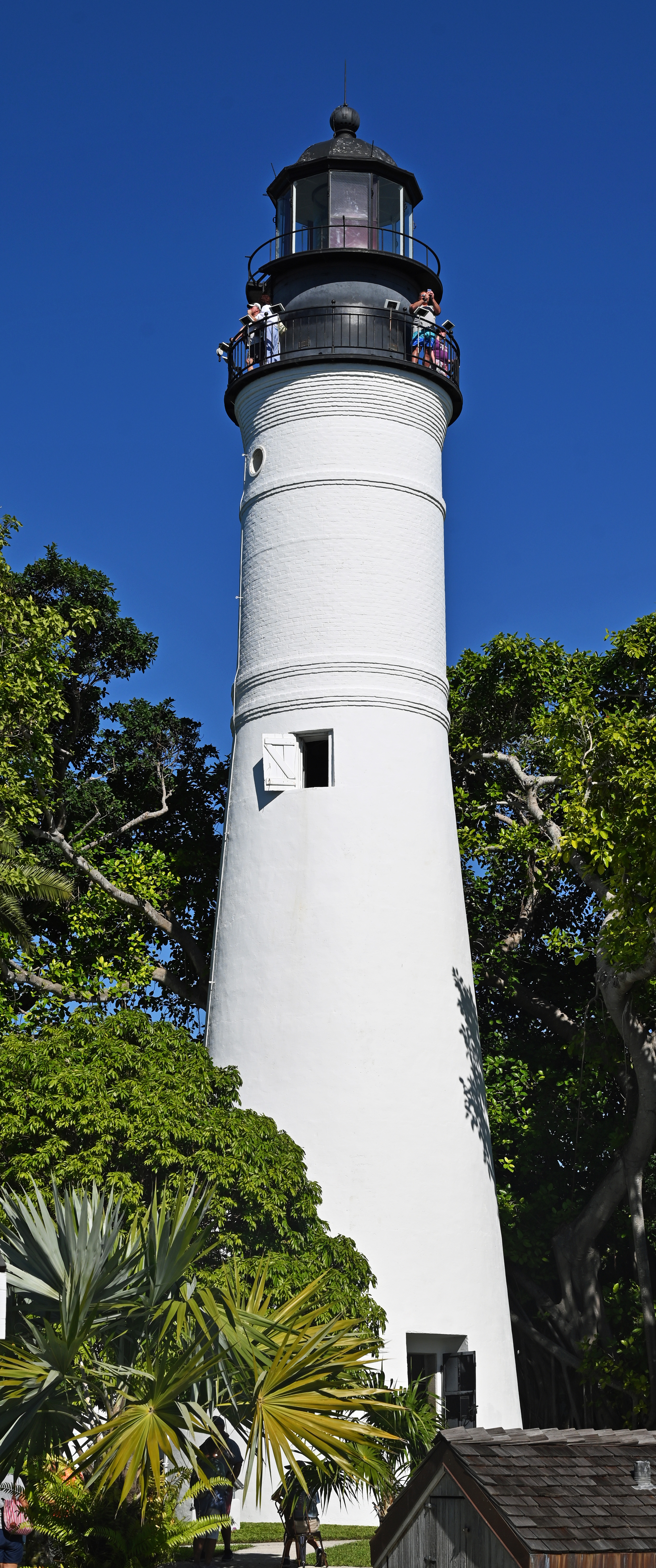
- Key West Lighthouse
- Location: Whiteheads Point in Key West, Florida
- Coordinates: 24.55064°N 81.80088°W

Tower
- Foundation: "Natural emplaced"
- Construction: Brick
- Automated: 1915
- Height: 73 feet (22 m)
- Shape: Conical

Light
- First lit: 1849
- Deactivated: 1969
- Lens: 13 Argand lamps with 21-inch (530 mm) reflectors

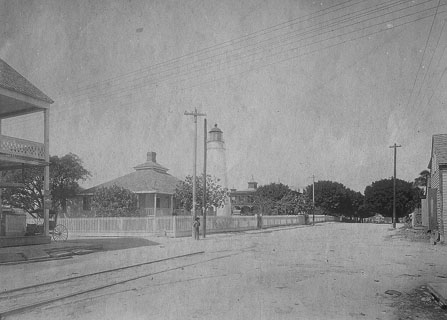
Original lighthouse, U.S. Coast Guard Archive

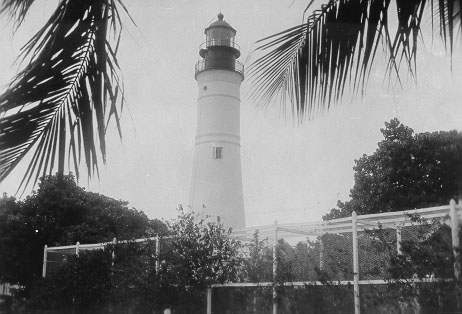
Current lighthouse, U.S. Coast Guard Archive

The Key West Lighthouse is located in Key West, Florida. The first Key West lighthouse was a 65-foot (20 m) tower completed in 1825. It had 15 lamps in 15-inch (380 mm) reflectors.

== History ==
The original lighthouse gained approval in 1824 and was to begin construction the same year. However, the contracted brickmason—Samuel B. Lincoln—became the likely victim of a hurricane when his ship disappeared en route to Florida. The initial plan anticipated the construction of a lighthouse on an outer key off the coast of Florida, but these islands proved to be completely submerged at different times of the year. Because of these circumstances, it was decided to build the lighthouse at the southernmost point of Key West instead.

The first keeper, Michael Mabrity, died in 1832, and his widow, Barbara, became the lighthouse keeper, serving for 32 years. The Great Havana Hurricane of 1846 destroyed the lighthouse; the USS Morris, which was wrecked during the storm, reported "a white sand beach covers the spot where Key West Lighthouse stood". Barbara Mabrity survived, but fourteen people who had sought refuge in the lighthouse tower died, including seven members of her family. (The same hurricane destroyed the Sand Key Lighthouse, eight miles (13 km) away, killing six people, including the keeper, Rebecca Flaherty, another widow of a previous keeper.) Barbara Mabrity continued to serve as keeper of the Key West Light until the early 1860s, when she was fired at age 82 for making statements against the Union (Key West remained under Union control throughout the Civil War).

As both lighthouses serving Key West had been destroyed in the 1846 hurricane, a ship, the Honey, was acquired and outfitted as a lightship to serve as the Sand Key Light until new lighthouses could be built. Due to efforts to reorganize the Lighthouse Board, Congress was slow to appropriate funds for the new lighthouses. The new tower for the Key West Light was completed in 1848. It was 50 feet (15 m) tall with 13 lamps in 21-inch (530 mm) reflectors, and stood on ground about 15 feet (4.6 m) above sea level. In 1858 the light received a third-order Fresnel lens. In 1873 the lantern was replaced (it had been damaged by a hurricane in 1866), adding three feet to the height of the tower. The growth of trees and taller buildings in Key West began to obscure the light, and in 1894 the tower was raised twenty feet, placing the light about 100 feet (30 m) above sea level.

After the Coast Guard decommissioned the Key West Light in 1969, it was turned over to Monroe County, which in turn leased it to the Key West Arts and Historical Society. The society operates the lighthouse and its associated buildings as the Key West Light House and Keeper's Quarters Museum. On display at the museum is the first-order Fresnel lens from the Sombrero Key lighthouse. In 2016, the Key West Lighthouse completed a $1 million renovation which repaired the slate roof, added ADA access to the Keeper's Quarters, and repainted the site.

== Other ==
In 2020 the Key West Art and Historical Society announced they designed a new small-group visitor area at the Lighthouse because of the COVID-19 pandemic.
