= Madruga Municipal Museum =

Museum in Madruga, Cuba

- Museo Municipal de Madruga
- Established: 12 February 1982
- Location: Madruga, Cuba

Madruga Municipal Museum is a museum located in the 25th avenue in Madruga, Cuba. It was established on 12 February 1982.

Since October 20, 2018, this Municipal Museum is named after María Mercedes García Santana.

The museum holds collections on history, weaponry and decorative arts.

== See also ==
- List of museums in Cuba
