= 1924 Cuba hurricane =

Category 5 Atlantic hurricane in 1924

Hurricane Ten 1924 Cuba hurricane
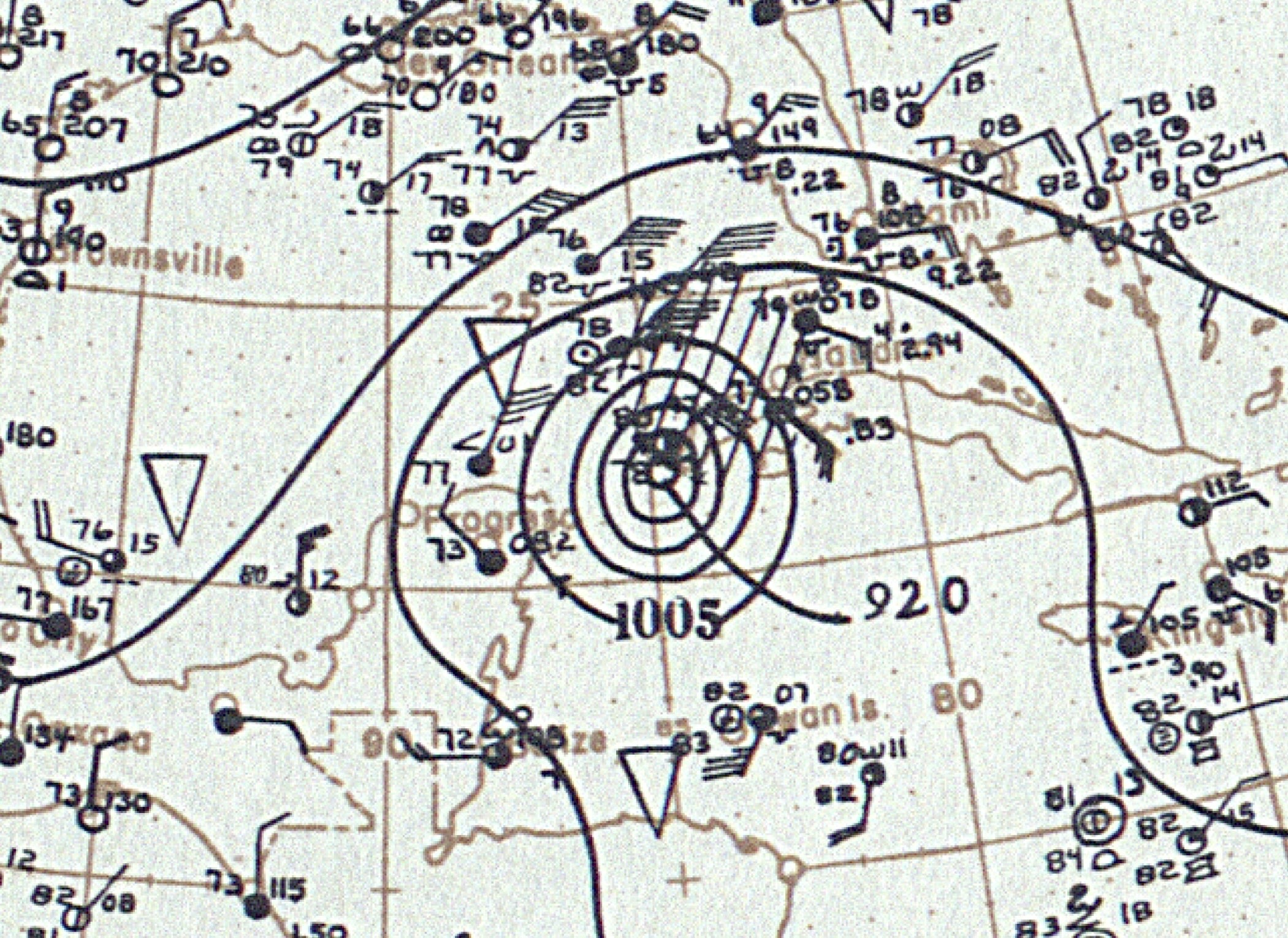
- Surface weather analysis of the hurricane at peak intensity on October 19, as it makes landfall in Cuba

Meteorological history
- Formed: October 14, 1924
- Dissipated: October 23, 1924

Category 5 major hurricane
- 1-minute sustained (SSHWS/NWS)
- Highest winds: 165 mph (270 km/h)
- Lowest pressure: 910 mbar (hPa); 26.87 inHg

Overall effects
- Fatalities: Around 90 total
- Damage: Central America, Yucatán Peninsula, Cuba, Florida, The Bahamas
- IBTrACS
- Part of the 1924 Atlantic hurricane season

The 1924 Cuba hurricane is the first officially recorded Category 5 Atlantic hurricane on the Saffir–Simpson scale (SSHWS), as well as the first Atlantic hurricane with sustained wind speeds of at least 135, 140, and 145 knots (155, 160, and 165 miles per hour), and the first officially recorded Category 5-equivalent tropical cyclone globally. It is also one of two hurricanes to make landfall on Cuba at Category 5 intensity, the other being Hurricane Irma in 2017 – both are also tied for the strongest Cuban landfall in terms of maximum sustained winds. The hurricane formed on October 14 in the western Caribbean, slowly organizing as it tracked northwestward. By October 16, the storm attained hurricane status to the east of the Yucatán Peninsula, and subsequently executed a small counterclockwise loop. On Friday, October 18, the hurricane intensified rapidly and, on the next day, reached an estimated peak intensity of 165 mph (266 km/h). Shortly thereafter, it struck extreme western Cuba at peak intensity, becoming the strongest hurricane on record to hit the country. Later the hurricane weakened greatly, striking southwestern Florida with winds of 90 mph (140 km/h) in a sparsely populated region. While crossing the state it weakened to tropical storm status, and after accelerating east-northeastward, it was absorbed by a cold front on October 23, to the south of Bermuda.

Across the western Caribbean Sea, the developing storm produced heavy rainfall and increased winds. Strong winds in western Cuba caused severe damage, with two small towns nearly destroyed. About 90 people were killed in the country, all in Pinar del Río Province. Later, the hurricane brought heavy rainfall to southern Florida, which caused flooding and crop damage. Damage was light in the state, and there were no casualties.

== Meteorological history ==
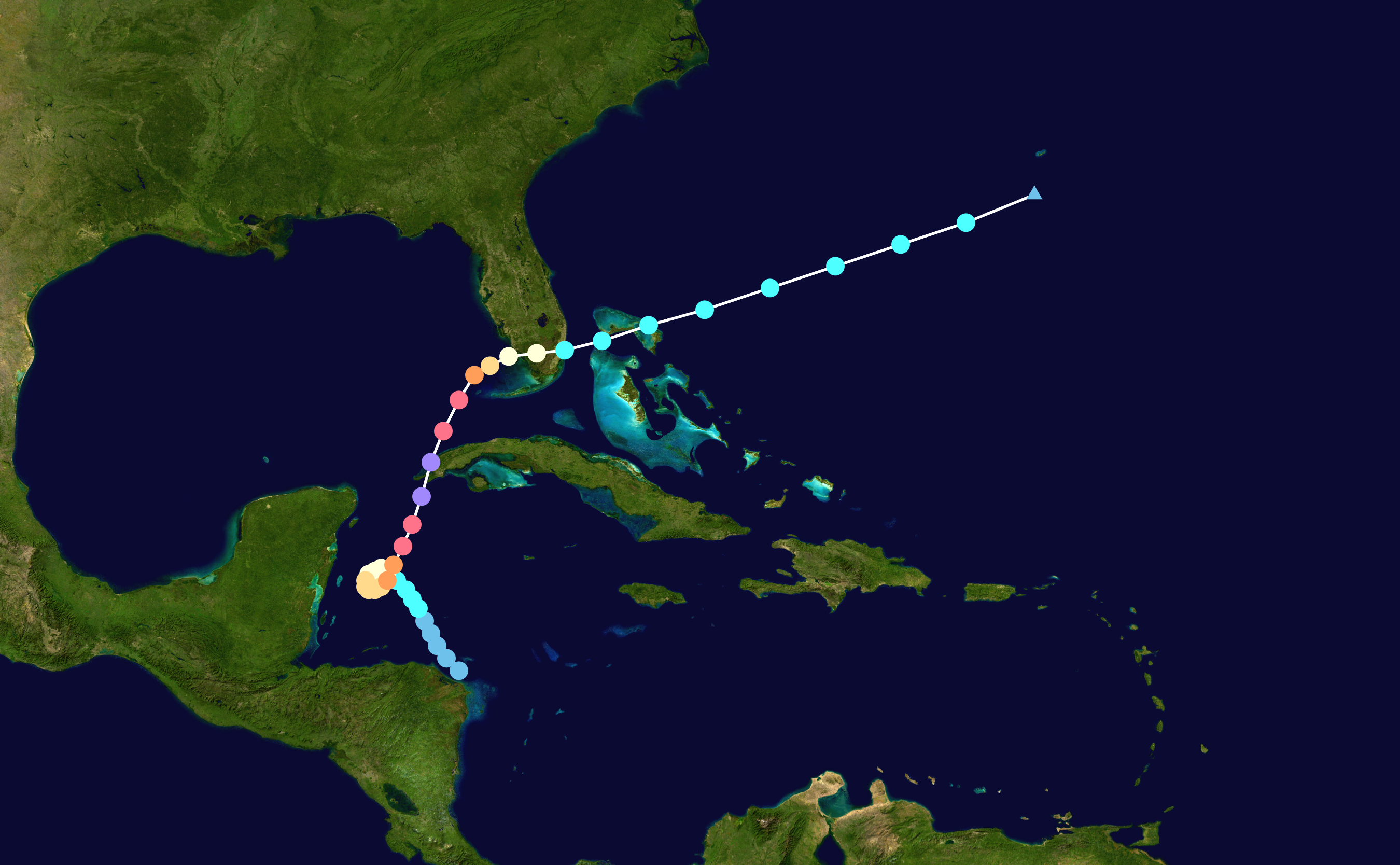
Map plotting the storm's track and intensity, according to the Saffir–Simpson scale Map key Saffir–Simpson scale Tropical depression (≤38 mph, ≤62 km/h) Tropical storm (39–73 mph, 63–118 km/h) Category 1 (74–95 mph, 119–153 km/h) Category 2 (96–110 mph, 154–177 km/h) Category 3 (111–129 mph, 178–208 km/h) Category 4 (130–156 mph, 209–251 km/h) Category 5 (≥157 mph, ≥252 km/h) Unknown Storm type Tropical cyclone Subtropical cyclone Extratropical cyclone, remnant low, tropical disturbance, or monsoon depression

On October 14, a tropical depression was first observed over the western Caribbean Sea, just off the eastern Honduras coast. It was a large and weak tropical cyclone, moving slowly northwestward and gradually intensifying. On October 15, it is estimated the depression attained tropical storm status, and its strengthening became more steady. The next day, the storm reached hurricane status about 130 mi (210 km) southeast of Cozumel, Quintana Roo. Around that time, it began to execute a small counterclockwise loop off the east coast of the Yucatán Peninsula. By October 18 the hurricane completed the loop, during which its winds increased to 115 mph (185 km/h); this is the equivalent of a major hurricane, or a Category 3 on the Saffir–Simpson Hurricane Scale. The estimation of its strength at this point was based on subsequent analysis of peripheral recordings of atmospheric pressure and maximum sustained winds by ships and land stations.

Beginning late on October 18, as the system tracked north-northeastward toward Cuba, the hurricane underwent rapid deepening, evidenced by a ship wind report of 120 mph (190 km/h). This wind report was initially thought to be the peak intensity of the cyclone; however, subsequent research confirmed further deepening, based on very low pressures recorded across the region. A ship in the radius of maximum winds reported a reading of 922 mbar; the barometer on the ship was found to be 5 mbar too high, resulting in a pressure of 917 mbar. Additionally, a station on land reported a pressure of 932 mbar (27.5 inHg). Based on the readings, the Hurricane Research Division estimated the hurricane attained a minimum central pressure of 910 mbar very near the western coast of Cuba; this suggested peak winds of 165 mph (266 km/h). Late on October 19, the hurricane made landfall in extreme western Cuba in Pinar del Río Province. José Carlos Millás, director of the National Observatory at Havana, believed that "this hurricane [was] one of the most severe ever experienced in our latitudes."

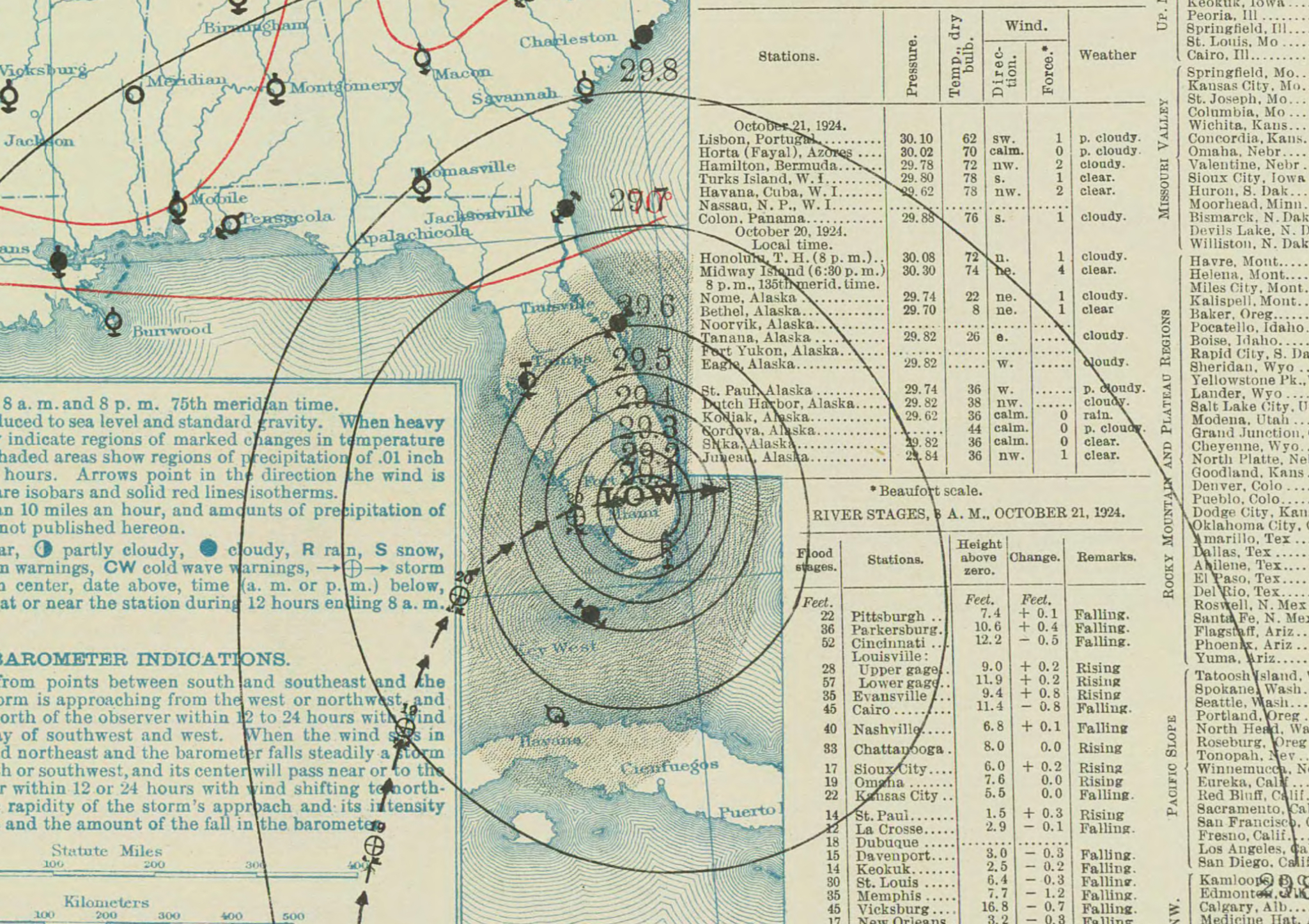
Surface weather map of the hurricane over Southern Florida on October 21

After exiting Cuba into the Gulf of Mexico, the hurricane weakened greatly. On October 20, it passed a short distance west of Key West, Florida, and very early on October 21, the hurricane moved over Marco Island, with winds of 90 mph (140 km/h). The cyclone weakened further as it turned eastward through the state, deteriorating to tropical storm status as it passed near or over Miami. It then accelerated east-northeastward, moving over the Abaco Islands in The Bahamas. Gradually weakening, the storm began interacting with an approaching cold front; late on October 23, it transitioned into an extratropical cyclone, and was absorbed by the front shortly thereafter.

== Impact and records ==
As a developing tropical cyclone, the storm produced increased winds and lower pressures in the Swan Islands, off the coast of Honduras. Heavy rainfall occurred throughout Jamaica, causing street flooding and several mudslides, but little damage. No disruptions were reported to communications or railway travel. The storm brushed eastern Belize while located off the coast, producing 3.62 inches (92 mm) of rainfall and light winds.

In extreme western Cuba, damage was very severe from the strong winds, likened to the impact of a tornado. Severe damage was reported in Los Arroyos and Arroyos de Mantua. In the latter location, around a dozen people were killed, 50 were injured, and nearly every building in the town was severely damaged; heavy losses also occurred to the tobacco crop. Across western Pinar del Río Province, the hurricane destroyed all communication links. Further from the center, the capital city of Havana recorded southerly winds of 72 mph (116 km/h), as well as a minimum pressure of about 999 mbar (29.5 inHg). Around the country, the hurricane capsized several ships, primarily fishing vessels. The death toll in the country was estimated at 90. In the days after the storm, Cuban President Zayas authorized about $30,000 in relief aid to send to hurricane victims in Pinar del Río.

Several days prior to striking Florida, the outer circulation began producing rainfall across the state. Storm warnings were issued along the east and west coastlines northward to Cedar Key and Titusville. Later, hurricane warnings were issued for much of the same area, and schools in the Tampa area were closed as the storm was expected to move ashore. The hurricane first affected Florida when it passed west of Key West, where sustained winds of 66 mph (106 km/h), along with gusts to 74 mph (119 km/h), were reported. Little damage occurred in the region, limited to downed trees; this was due to advance warning by the U.S. Weather Bureau, which advised ships to remain at port and for residents to secure property. Later, the hurricane moved ashore in a sparsely populated region of southwestern Florida. Damage was reported in Fort Myers and Punta Gorda and communications were temporarily cut, although no deaths were reported. Heavy rainfall was reported along its path, and one location accumulated 23.22 inches (590 mm) in a 24‑hour period; this established a new one-day rainfall record in the state. A station in Miami recorded 12.18 inches (309 mm), and wind gusts in the area approached hurricane force. The combination of winds and rain damaged 5% of the local citrus and avocado crop. The rainfall flooded streets, homes, and commercial buildings in the Miami area, and hundreds of people were left without telephone access. No impact was reported in the Bahamas.

After a reanalysis of hurricanes between 1921 and 1925, the National Hurricane Center's Atlantic reanalysis project determined that this hurricane attained maximum sustained winds of 165 mph (266 km/h), making it a Category 5 hurricane on the Saffir–Simpson Hurricane Scale. The hurricane is the earliest known to have attained the intensity, eclipsing the 1928 Okeechobee hurricane, which was previously thought to be the earliest storm of this intensity. It is also one of only two on record to make landfall in Cuba at Category 5 status, with the other being Hurricane Irma of 2017, which also made landfall with maximum sustained winds of 165 mph (266 km/h). A hurricane in 1846 that hit the country was also thought to have struck at Category 5 status, although the storm existed prior to the start of the Atlantic hurricane database.

When the steamship "Toledo" recorded an atmospheric pressure of 922 mbar (27.2 inHg) during the 1924 Cuba hurricane, it was the lowest pressure recorded in an Atlantic hurricane, breaking the previous record of 924 mbar (27.28 inHg) in the Atlantic hurricane of 1853. The record during this storm lasted until the 1932 Cuba hurricane, when a minimum pressure of 915 mbar (27.0 inHg) was reported. The reading of 932 mbar (27.5 inHg) at Los Arroyos in Mantua, Pinar del Río remains the lowest pressure recorded on land in Cuba.

== See also ==
- List of Category 5 Atlantic hurricanes
- List of Florida hurricanes (1900–1949)
- 1932 Cuba hurricane
- Hurricane Irma
