= Madruga =

- Municipality
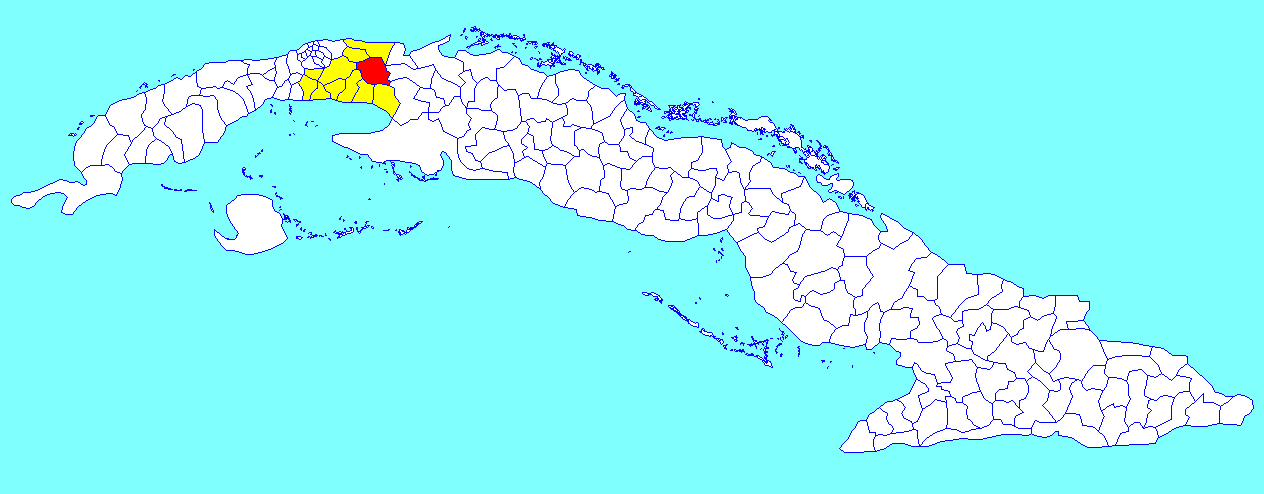
- Madruga municipality (red) within Mayabeque Province (yellow) and Cuba
- Coordinates: 22°54′59″N 81°51′26″W
- Country: Cuba
- Province: Mayabeque
- Founded: 1803
- Established: 1866 (Municipality)

Area
  - Total: 464 km^{2} (179 sq mi)
- Elevation: 175 m (574 ft)

Population (2022)
  - Total: 26,412
  - Density: 56.9/km^{2} (147/sq mi)
- Time zone: UTC-5 (EST)
- Area code: +53-47
- Website: https://tumadruga.gob.cu/es/

Madruga (Spanish pronunciation: [maˈðɾuɣa]) is a municipality and town in the Mayabeque Province of Cuba. It is located in the eastern part of the province, between Matanzas and Güines. It was founded in 1803.

== Geography ==
In 1940, the municipality was divided into the barrios of Concordia and Cayajabos, Este, Itabo, Majagua, Oeste, Sabana de Robles and San Blas.

After 1973, the municipality includes Madruga; Aguacate; Viviendas Campesinas; La Granja; Cayajabos Pipián and Flor de Itabo.

== Demographics ==
In 2022, the municipality of Madruga had a population of 26,412. With a total area of 464 km^{2} (179 sq mi), it has a population density of 57/km^{2} (150/sq mi).

== See also ==
- Madruga Municipal Museum
- Municipalities of Cuba
- List of cities in Cuba
