= USS Morris (1846 schooner) =

Coordinates: 24.3727°N 82.1467°W

History

United States
- Name: USS Morris
- Namesake: Robert Morris (1734–1806), American politician and signer of the Declaration of Independence
- In service: Early 1846
- Fate: Wrecked, 11 October 1846

General characteristics
- Type: Schooner
- Displacement: 112 long tons (114 t)
- Length: 83 ft 4 in (25.40 m)
- Beam: 20 ft 8 in (6.30 m)
- Depth: 9 ft 4 in (2.84 m)
- Propulsion: Sails
- Armament: 2 × 6 pdr (2.7 kg) guns

The third USS Morris was a schooner in the United States Navy in commission in 1846. She was named for Robert Morris, a Founding Father, Continental Congressman, and major financier of the American Revolutionary War.

Morris served as a despatch boat during the Mexican War, going into service early in 1846. She was wrecked in a hurricane off Key West, Florida on 11 October 1846.
