= Ivan Ray Tannehill =

Ivan Ray Tannehill (March 17, 1890 – May 2, 1959) was a commissioned US Army Lieutenant at Fort Story, Virginia and soon after World War I, became a forecaster with the United States Weather Bureau and a prolific writer, focusing on meteorology. His text on hurricanes remained the defining work on the topic from the late 1930s into the early 1950s.

== Career ==
First a newspaper reporter and a teacher, Ivan began work for the United States Weather Bureau as a weather observer in Houston in 1914. He served during World War I as a weather officer in the Signal Corps. After the war, he became the Officer in Charge (OIC) at the Galveston, Texas weather office. Moving to Washington, D. C., he became the Assistant Chief of the Forecast Division in 1929. He later served as Chief of the Marine Division, SR&F Division, and Assistant Chief of Bureau for Operations. He retired in October 1954 and moved to Frederick, Maryland.

== Thoughts on the warming of the 1930s and 1940s ==
Scientists were aware of the warming of sections of the United States by about 3˚F since the 1860s. The American Meteorological Society held a convention in Washington, D.C. where the topic was discussed. Dr. Tannehill came away from the meeting thinking the cause was due to a slow increase in the radiation of the sun.

== Connection to 1947 UFO sightings ==
After a flurry of UFO reports were witnessed across the United States, including one at Roswell, the then-chief of the U. S. Weather Bureau's division of synoptic reports and forecasts was asked about the objects being seen in the sky. His quote was "I’d like to see one first before I make a guess." He did, however, rule out weather balloons, stating they were unlikely to have been mistaken "all over the country and all in one week" for mysterious objects speeding through the sky at supersonic speeds.

== Works Published ==
- Weather Round the World. (1913)
- Note on Pilot-Balloon Flights in a Thunderstorm Formation (1919)
- The Hurricane (July 1934 1st ed., February 1939 2nd ed.) Department of Agriculture. Miscellaneous Publication 197
- Preparation and use of weather maps at sea (1935)
- Dusters and Black Blizzards (1936-07-09). Los Angeles Times.
- Cloud forms according to the international system of classification. Washington, U.S. Govt. Print. Off., 1938.ii, 8 p. : plates; 24 cm.
- Hurricanes, their nature and history, particularly those of the West Indies and the southern coasts of the United States (1938 1st ed. to 1956 9th ed.)
- Drought and Its Causes and Effects (1947)
- All About the Weather (1953)
- The Hurricane Hunters, Illustrated With Photos (1955)

== Personal life ==
At the time of his death, Ivan had two brothers, a sister, a wife Mary Gertrude (Mamo), a daughter Doris, son-in-law William Ulrich Hutterly II., and three grandchildren Ric, John, and Jane.
