= Ninth Legislature of the National Assembly of People's Power of Cuba =

Cuban legislature (2018–2023)

Ninth Legislature of the National Assembly of People's Power Novena Legislatura de la Asamblea Nacional del Poder Popular
- 9th Legislature
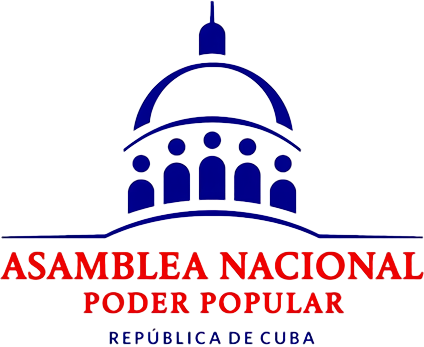

Type
- Type: Unicameral

History
- Preceded by: Eighth Legislature

Leadership
- President: Esteban Lazo Hernández
- Vice President: Ana María Mari Machado
- Secretary: Homero Acosta Álvarez

Structure
- Seats: 605
- Political groups: Communist Party of Cuba

Elections
- Voting system: Two-round system
- Last election: 2018 Cuban parliamentary election
- Next election: 2023 Cuban parliamentary election

Meeting place
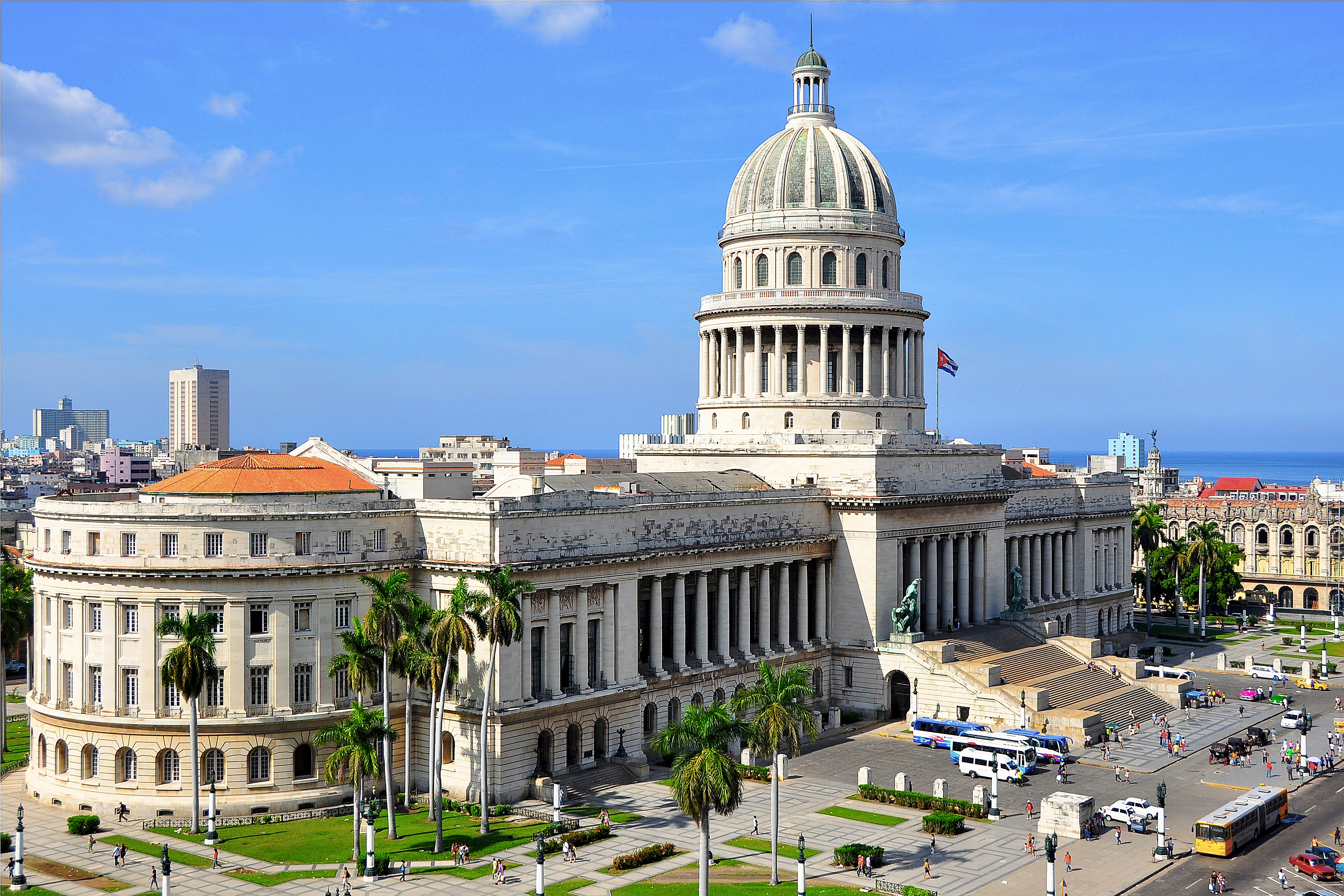
- El Capitolio, Havana

Website
- https://www.parlamentocubano.gob.cu/

The Ninth Legislature of the National Assembly of People's Power was the parliamentary session of Cuba's National Assembly of People's Power that convened from April 18, 2018, to 2023.

The 605 deputies were elected during the 2018 Cuban parliamentary election for a five-year term.

The President was Esteban Lazo Hernández, the Vice President was Ana María Mari Machado, and the Secretary was Homero Acosta Álvarez.

The members of the Ninth Legislature of the National Assembly were as follows:

== Deputies ==
Province	Municipality	Deputy
Artemisa	Bahía Honda	María Mercedes Cordero Díaz
Artemisa	Bahía Honda	Olga Lidia Tapia Iglesias
Artemisa	Mariel	Viviana Barrios Echazabal
Artemisa	Mariel	Antonio Evidio Hernández López
Artemisa	Guanajay	Carmen Rosa López Rodríguez
Artemisa	Guanajay	Ibis Martínez Palmer
Artemisa	Caimito	Miguel Enrique Charbonet Martell
Artemisa	Caimito	Yenisey Cruz Carreño
Artemisa	Bauta	Ana Teresa Igarza Martínez
Artemisa	Bauta	Lourdes Lorenzo Castro
Artemisa	San Antonio de los Baños	Yadelki Hernández Morales
Artemisa	San Antonio de los Baños	Yamila Sarduy Martínez
Artemisa	Güira de Melena	Leonardo Andollo Valdés
Artemisa	Güira de Melena	Omar Barroso Miranda
Artemisa	Alquízar	Jorge Emilio Espinosa Infante
Artemisa	Alquízar	Armando Trujllo González
Artemisa	Artemisa	Orlaide Acosta Jiménez
Artemisa	Artemisa	Jorge Luis Torres Barrios
Artemisa	Artemisa	Ramiro Valdés Menéndez
Artemisa	Artemisa	José Antonio Valeriano Fariñas
Artemisa	Candelaria	Dania Rosa Hernández Hernández
Artemisa	Candelaria	Teresa Valentina Martínez Mendaro
Artemisa	San Cristóbal	María Isabel Bocourt Moreno
Artemisa	San Cristóbal	Leopoldo Cintra Frías
Artemisa	San Cristóbal	Juan Domínguez Miranda
Artemisa	San Cristóbal	Margarita Soroa Valdés
Camagüey	Carlos Manuel de Céspedes	Gastón Idel Martínez Pérez
Camagüey	Carlos Manuel de Céspedes	Alberto Eduardo Núñez Betancourt
Camagüey	Esmeralda	Andrea Armas Rodríguez
Camagüey	Esmeralda	Delfina María Rodríguez Santana
Camagüey	Sierra de Cubitas	Miriela Lugo Iglesias
Camagüey	Sierra de Cubitas	Elbys Pérez Olivera
Camagüey	Minas	Marcia Chicoy Ramírez
Camagüey	Minas	Reynier Jañes Batista
Camagüey	Nuevitas	Alfredo López Valdés
Camagüey	Nuevitas	Elismary Rodríguez Rivero
Camagüey	Nuevitas	Francisca Sages Márquez
Camagüey	Guáimaro	Lisara Liliam Corona Oliveros
Camagüey	Guáimaro	Rodney René Socarrás Bueno
Camagüey	Sibanicú	Yaramis Armenteros Medina
Camagüey	Sibanicú	Aleisey Carmenates Llanes
Camagüey	Camagüey	Gerardo Alfonso Rabí
Camagüey	Camagüey	Juan Carlos Álvarez Regueiro
Camagüey	Camagüey	Regina María Balaguer Sánchez
Camagüey	Camagüey	Lissette Bouza Cabrera
Camagüey	Camagüey	Norquis Mercedes Caballero Rojas
Camagüey	Camagüey	Faure Chomón Mediavilla
Camagüey	Camagüey	Miguel García Fransuá
Camagüey	Camagüey	Doraine de la Caridad Linares Jiménez
Camagüey	Camagüey	Yipsi Moreno González
Camagüey	Camagüey	Salvador Pardo Cruz
Camagüey	Camagüey	Eulogio Pimentel Vázquez
Camagüey	Camagüey	Dixamy Rodríguez Gómez
Camagüey	Camagüey	Daicar Saladrigas González
Camagüey	Camagüey	Yurismaikel Sánchez Horta
Camagüey	Camagüey	Teresa de la Caridad Tamayo Guerra
Camagüey	Camagüey	Jorge Luis Tapia Fonseca
Camagüey	Florida	Nelson del Sol Serrallonga
Camagüey	Florida	Anierka Fernández del Monte
Camagüey	Florida	Orlando Celso García Ramírez
Camagüey	Florida	Beatriz Rodríguez Fernández
Camagüey	Vertientes	Yoinis Arias Liriano
Camagüey	Vertientes	Santiago Eduardo Lajes Choy
Camagüey	Vertientes	Luis Cipriano Sixto Mora
Camagüey	Jimaguayú	Isabel Graciela González Cárdenas
Camagüey	Jimaguayú	Ydel Guevara Castellanos
Camagüey	Najasa	Elba Martínez Amador
Camagüey	Najasa	Yudith Rojas Peña
Camagüey	Santa Cruz del Sur	Carlos Andrés Masid Castejón
Camagüey	Santa Cruz del Sur	Alfonso Noya Martínez
Ciego de Ávila	Chambas	José Antonio Pérez Pérez
Ciego de Ávila	Chambas	Lourdes María Ulacia Martínez
Ciego de Ávila	Morón	Iyolexis Correa Lorenzo
Ciego de Ávila	Morón	Nelson Domínguez Cedeño
Ciego de Ávila	Morón	Silvia González García
Ciego de Ávila	Bolivia	Leonides López Figueredo
Ciego de Ávila	Bolivia	Barbara Alexis Terry Depestre
Ciego de Ávila	Primero de Enero	Leyda Martínez Arnaiz
Ciego de Ávila	Primero de Enero	Yamilé Zulueta Iglesias
Ciego de Ávila	Ciro Redondo	Félix Duarte Ortega
Ciego de Ávila	Ciro Redondo	Yorqui Navarro Pérez
Ciego de Ávila	Florencia	Danysell Cañizares Carbonell
Ciego de Ávila	Florencia	Iliana María Venegas Acosta
Ciego de Ávila	Majagua	Humberto Fleitas Portal
Ciego de Ávila	Majagua	Yenisey Mora Férguson
Ciego de Ávila	Ciego de Avila	Ramón Borges González
Ciego de Ávila	Ciego de Avila	Yalennys Bustamante Bombino
Ciego de Ávila	Ciego de Avila	Ramón David Estévez Solís
Ciego de Ávila	Ciego de Avila	Alberto Pastor Fernández Pena
Ciego de Ávila	Ciego de Avila	Irma Martínez Castrillón
Ciego de Ávila	Ciego de Avila	Milagro de la Caridad Pérez Caballero
Ciego de Ávila	Ciego de Avila	Raúl Pérez Carmenate
Ciego de Ávila	Ciego de Avila	Reina de la Caridad Torres Pérez
Ciego de Ávila	Venezuela	Dalia Aguiar González
Ciego de Ávila	Venezuela	Rafael Pérez Carmenate
Ciego de Ávila	Baraguá	Idalmis Rosa Mendoza del Toro
Ciego de Ávila	Baraguá	Gustavo Luis Rodríguez Rollero
Cienfuegos	Aguada de Pasajeros	Yusimi González Herrera
Cienfuegos	Aguada de Pasajeros	Modesto Mora Angarica
Cienfuegos	Rodas	Yaquelín Luis Cobas
Cienfuegos	Rodas	Susely Morfa González
Cienfuegos	Palmira	Marisol Iznaga Morfa
Cienfuegos	Palmira	Yoexis Manresa Peñalver
Cienfuegos	Lajas	Yuleimys Becerra Estrada
Cienfuegos	Lajas	Arnaldo Antonio Costa Delgado
Cienfuegos	Cruces	Regla Batista Rodríguez
Cienfuegos	Cruces	Arelys Falcón Hernández
Cienfuegos	Cumanayagua	Oslando Chacón Terry
Cienfuegos	Cumanayagua	Fredys Luis Sánchez
Cienfuegos	Cienfuegos	Lydia Esther Brunet Nodarse
Cienfuegos	Cienfuegos	Eduardo Walfrido Coll Rodríguez
Cienfuegos	Cienfuegos	Marlene Bárbara Curbelo de la Rosa
Cienfuegos	Cienfuegos	Irán Millán Cuétara
Cienfuegos	Cienfuegos	Roberto Morales Ojeda
Cienfuegos	Cienfuegos	Dinorah Blasa Navarro Sarría
Cienfuegos	Cienfuegos	Enrique Richard López
Cienfuegos	Cienfuegos	Nancy Robaina Monzón
Cienfuegos	Cienfuegos	Liz Belkis Rosabal Ponce
Cienfuegos	Abreus	Francisca Mayrelis Pernía Cordero
Cienfuegos	Abreus	Maribel Rodríguez Puig
Granma	Río Cauto	Ramón Osmani Aguilar Betancourt
Granma	Río Cauto	Asela Ramona Blanco Llanes
Granma	Cauto Cristo	Yaquelín Puebla Lachel
Granma	Cauto Cristo	Daryami Leandra Ramírez Varón
Granma	Jiguaní	Néstor Bárbaro Hernández Martínez
Granma	Jiguaní	Lizet Márquez Gómez
Granma	Jiguaní	Yoleidis Suárez González
Granma	Bayamo	Samuel Calzada Deyunde
Granma	Bayamo	Yanelis Fonseca Fonseca
Granma	Bayamo	Francis Rebeca Garcés García
Granma	Bayamo	Federico Hernández Hernández
Granma	Bayamo	Yankiel Hernández Zamora
Granma	Bayamo	Nereyda López Labrada
Granma	Bayamo	Estela Cristina Luna Morales
Granma	Bayamo	Maimir Mesa Ramos
Granma	Bayamo	Damiana Niurka Pérez Figueredo
Granma	Bayamo	Raúl Hiosvani Rosales Torres
Granma	Bayamo	Yordanis Santos Martínez
Granma	Bayamo	Ivis Niuba Villa Millán
Granma	Yara	Maricela Figueredo Rosales
Granma	Yara	Aníval Ernesto Ramos Socarrás
Granma	Yara	Pedro Víctor Simón Rodríguez
Granma	Manzanillo	Iris Betancourt Téllez
Granma	Manzanillo	Yoandris Despaigne Videt
Granma	Manzanillo	Felicia Martínez Suárez
Granma	Manzanillo	Caridad Molina Rondón
Granma	Manzanillo	Elba Rosa Pérez Montoya
Granma	Manzanillo	José Enrique Remón Domínguez
Granma	Campechuela	Rolando Miguel González Patricio
Granma	Campechuela	Glennis López Mojena
Granma	Media Luna	Manuel Santiago Sobrino Martínez
Granma	Media Luna	Martha Yoanis Vázquez Pato
Granma	Niquero	Yenisey González Rodríguez
Granma	Niquero	Fernándo López Peña
Granma	Pilón	Martha Dignó Aguilera
Granma	Pilón	Guillermo García Frías
Granma	Bartolomé Masó	Idael Ballester Chacón
Granma	Bartolomé Masó	Romárico Vidal Sotomayor García
Granma	Buey Arriba	Ania Yelina Fernández Lara
Granma	Buey Arriba	María Caridad Martí Santana
Granma	Guisa	Carlos Rafael Fuentes León
Granma	Guisa	Leynis Viera López
Guantánamo	El Salvador	Denny Legrá Azaharez
Guantánamo	El Salvador	Yamil Muchuly Venzant
Guantánamo	Guantánamo	Rolando Acebal Monte
Guantánamo	Guantánamo	Eldys Baratute Benavides
Guantánamo	Guantánamo	Gladys Bejerano Portela
Guantánamo	Guantánamo	Yaisi Brown Matos
Guantánamo	Guantánamo	Yovanys Chacón Revé
Guantánamo	Guantánamo	Idaliena Díaz Casamayor
Guantánamo	Guantánamo	Dalia Expósito Jerez
Guantánamo	Guantánamo	Reina Elvia Labañino Labañino
Guantánamo	Guantánamo	José Ramón Machado Ventura
Guantánamo	Guantánamo	Inés Planche Martínez
Guantánamo	Guantánamo	Henry Rodríguez Terrero
Guantánamo	Yateras	Rafael Hernández Delgado
Guantánamo	Yateras	Arletis Iglesia Romero
Guantánamo	Baracoa	Nancy Acosta Hernández
Guantánamo	Baracoa	Maryolis Gaínza Estévez
Guantánamo	Baracoa	Lisandra Sabó Vega
Guantánamo	Baracoa	Arnaldo Tamayo Méndez
Guantánamo	Maisí	Alexis Estévez Matos
Guantánamo	Maisí	Rosalina Fournier Frómeta
Guantánamo	Imías	María Isabel Chivás Duncan
Guantánamo	Imías	Yudisley Cueto García
Guantánamo	San Antonio del Sur	Alis Azahares Torreblanca
Guantánamo	San Antonio del Sur	Franc Orlys del Toro Pérez
Guantánamo	Manuel Tames	Yasmin Argote Ravelo
Guantánamo	Manuel Tames	Mercedes Chibás Albear
Guantánamo	Caimanera	Editha Castillo Puebla
Guantánamo	Caimanera	Raúl Alfonso Torres Rondón
Guantánamo	Niceto Pérez	Oliber Barroso Barroso
Guantánamo	Niceto Pérez	Diosnel San Loys Martínez
Holguín	Gibara	Sonia Adelaida Chacón Fernández
Holguín	Gibara	Manuel Marrero Cruz
Holguín	Gibara	Teresa Georgina Miguez Campaña
Holguín	Gibara	Maritza Salas Gé
Holguín	Rafael Freyre	Magalys Vírgen Cabo de Villa Rodríguez
Holguín	Rafael Freyre	Roberto Legrá Sotolongo
Holguín	Rafael Freyre	Daimara Reyes Brizuela
Holguín	Banes	George Américo Batista Pérez
Holguín	Banes	Inés María Chapman Waugh
Holguín	Banes	Marilín Gallardo García
Holguín	Banes	Hernán Ochoa González
Holguín	Antilla	Ana Rafaela Hernández Rosas
Holguín	Antilla	René Rodríguez Morales
Holguín	Báguanos	Yunia Pérez Hernández
Holguín	Báguanos	Reyna Salermo Escalona
Holguín	Holguín	Niurka Rosa Aguilera Batallan
Holguín	Holguín	Jesús Becerra Morciego
Holguín	Holguín	Rafael Antonio Brown Sutherland
Holguín	Holguín	Julio Caballero Terrero
Holguín	Holguín	Melvis Canales García
Holguín	Holguín	Jorge Cuevas Ramos
Holguín	Holguín	Ramón Espinosa Martín
Holguín	Holguín	Irlet de la Caridad Fernández Peña
Holguín	Holguín	Galina Galcerán Chacón
Holguín	Holguín	Margarita Marilene González Fernández
Holguín	Holguín	Julio César Méndez Rivero
Holguín	Holguín	María Petra Patterson Adams
Holguín	Holguín	Dionicia Milagro Portelles Duque
Holguín	Holguín	Yanet Pupo Estupiñán
Holguín	Holguín	Yanet Ricardo González
Holguín	Holguín	Pavel Rodríguez Rodríguez
Holguín	Holguín	Ricardo Antonio Suárez Martínez
Holguín	Holguín	Luis Antonio Torres Iribar
Holguín	Calixto García	Damara Calzadilla Meriño
Holguín	Calixto García	Yoandra María Laguarda Labrada
Holguín	Calixto García	Rafael Ramón Santiesteban Pozo
Holguín	Cacocum	Agustín Roger Chiong Aguilera
Holguín	Cacocum	Mariela Cruz Herrera
Holguín	Urbano Noris	Milagros Rodríguez Peña
Holguín	Urbano Noris	Isabel Cristina Torres Torres
Holguín	Cueto	Esther Dupón Cosella
Holguín	Cueto	Yunior Rodríguez Ortiz
Holguín	Mayarí	Santiago Badía González
Holguín	Mayarí	Laritza Calzadilla Rojas
Holguín	Mayarí	Julio César Estupiñán Rodríguez
Holguín	Mayarí	Yordanis Pérez Urrutia
Holguín	Mayarí	María Armenia Yi Reina
Holguín	Frank País	Damaris Campbell Blanco
Holguín	Frank País	Luis Velázquez Pérez
Holguín	Sagua de Tánamo	Anislay Leyva Peña
Holguín	Sagua de Tánamo	Yusuan Palacios Ortega
Holguín	Moa	Judet Evelyn Arias
Holguín	Moa	Manuel Francisco Hernández Aguilera
Holguín	Moa	Edelis Hidalgo Barallobre
Holguín	Moa	Eder Manuel Oliveros Garcell
La Habana	Playa	Vilma Patricia Alvarado Godoy
La Habana	Playa	Jorge Amador Berlanga Acosta
La Habana	Playa	Marie Castillo Fiallo
La Habana	Playa	Lázara Mercedes López Acea
La Habana	Playa	Rodrigo Malmierca Díaz
La Habana	Playa	Eduardo Martínez Díaz
La Habana	Playa	Tahis Sánchez Valdivia
La Habana	Playa	Ommeris Trápaga Amaro
La Habana	Playa	Adel Onofre Yzquierdo Rodríguez
La Habana	Plaza de la Revolución	Mariela Castro Espín
La Habana	Plaza de la Revolución	Yuniaski Crespo Baquero
La Habana	Plaza de la Revolución	Orlando Gutiérrez Boza
La Habana	Plaza de la Revolución	Marino Murillo Jorge
La Habana	Plaza de la Revolución	Magda Ileana Pérez Matos
La Habana	Plaza de la Revolución	Yamilka Rodríguez Castellano
La Habana	Plaza de la Revolución	José Luis Toledo Santander
La Habana	Centro Habana	Luis Angel Adán Roble
La Habana	Centro Habana	Enrique Alemán Gutiérrez
La Habana	Centro Habana	Ernesto Luis Corvo Vizcaino
La Habana	Centro Habana	Digna Guerra Ramírez
La Habana	Centro Habana	Jorge Hernández Fraga
La Habana	Centro Habana	Lourdes Otero Leyva
La Habana	Centro Habana	Delsa Esther Puebla Viltres
La Habana	Old Havana	Isael Alfonso Graña
La Habana	Old Havana	Félix Julio Alfonso López
La Habana	Old Havana	Gema Dayrene Álvarez Toyo
La Habana	Old Havana	Eusebio Leal Spengler
La Habana	Regla	Osmin Abel Camejo Peñalver
La Habana	Regla	Xiomara Soto Montero
La Habana	La Habana del Este	Margarita Bacilia Araujo Suárez
La Habana	La Habana del Este	Víctor Manuel Calá Pérez
La Habana	La Habana del Este	Marta Emilia Marín Mato
La Habana	La Habana del Este	Lizette Martínez Luzardo
La Habana	La Habana del Este	Aleida María Robinson Delgado
La Habana	La Habana del Este	Arelys Santana Bello
La Habana	La Habana del Este	Vladimir Saure Bermúdez
La Habana	La Habana del Este	Irma Engracia Soriano Sifontes
La Habana	La Habana del Este	Jorge Luis Villa Miranda
La Habana	Guanabacoa	Carmen Verónica Almaguer Escandell
La Habana	Guanabacoa	Miguel Ángel Barnet Lanza
La Habana	Guanabacoa	Yunia Borroto Ramos
La Habana	Guanabacoa	Delilah Díaz Fernández
La Habana	Guanabacoa	Manuel González Fernández
La Habana	Guanabacoa	Ulises Guilarte de Nacimiento
La Habana	San Miguel del Padrón	Alicia Roberta Alonso Becerra
La Habana	San Miguel del Padrón	Grisel Anaya Velázquez
La Habana	San Miguel del Padrón	Marisel Castañeda Morales
La Habana	San Miguel del Padrón	Jorge Caridad González Pérez
La Habana	San Miguel del Padrón	Marice Guzmán Álvarez
La Habana	San Miguel del Padrón	Johana Odriozola Guitart
La Habana	San Miguel del Padrón	Rosario del Pilar Pentón Díaz
La Habana	San Miguel del Padrón	Lourdes Rodríguez Benítez
La Habana	Diez de Octubre	Bárbara Maritza Agón Fernández
La Habana	Diez de Octubre	Jorge Luis Báez Ricardo
La Habana	Diez de Octubre	Karell Castillo Wilson
La Habana	Diez de Octubre	Juan Fernández Marzo
La Habana	Diez de Octubre	Reinaldo García Zapata
La Habana	Diez de Octubre	Jorge Jesús Gómez Barranco
La Habana	Diez de Octubre	Alberto Osorio González Suárez
La Habana	Diez de Octubre	José Amado Ricardo Guerra
La Habana	Diez de Octubre	Miriam Rodríguez Castanedo
La Habana	Diez de Octubre	Bruno Rodríguez Parrilla
La Habana	Cerro	Antonio Eduardo Becali Garrido
La Habana	Cerro	Julia Dolores Cabrera Reymont
La Habana	Cerro	Gerardo Hernández Nordelo
La Habana	Cerro	Manuel Oceguera Sierra
La Habana	Cerro	Gilmer Ricardo Rodríguez León
La Habana	Cerro	Gema de los Milagros Rodríguez Tamayo
La Habana	Marianao	Ricardo Cabrisas Ruiz
La Habana	Marianao	Antonio Carreras Almeida
La Habana	Marianao	Danhiz Díaz Pereira
La Habana	Marianao	Jorge Rafael Duvalón Rodríguez
La Habana	Marianao	Ailed Georgelina Hernández Rodríguez
La Habana	Marianao	Ania Guillermina Lastres Morera
La Habana	Marianao	Raúl Palmero Fernández
La Habana	La Lisa	José Castañeda Martínez
La Habana	La Lisa	Yanet Hernández Pérez
La Habana	La Lisa	Yordanka López Oña
La Habana	La Lisa	Miriam Nicado García
La Habana	La Lisa	Elier Ramírez Cañedo
La Habana	La Lisa	Jorge Luis Romero Herrera
La Habana	La Lisa	Yury Valdés Balbín
La Habana	Boyeros	José Osvaldo Fernández Batalla
La Habana	Boyeros	Víctor Manuel Gutiérrez Aguilar
La Habana	Boyeros	Saray de la Caridad Infante Díaz
La Habana	Boyeros	Yinet Infante Paifer
La Habana	Boyeros	Ramón Pardo Guerra
La Habana	Boyeros	Leonor Pérez Pérez
La Habana	Boyeros	Samuel Carlos Rodiles Planas
La Habana	Boyeros	José Rubiera Torres
La Habana	Boyeros	Yanisbell Sánchez Rodríguez
La Habana	Boyeros	Mileidis Torres Jiménez
La Habana	Arroyo Naranjo	Onelio Mariano Aguilera Bermúdez
La Habana	Arroyo Naranjo	Martha Cuesta Sánchez
La Habana	Arroyo Naranjo	Yaimara Ramona Díaz Placeres
La Habana	Arroyo Naranjo	Lizette González García
La Habana	Arroyo Naranjo	Gerardo Enrique Hernández Suárez
La Habana	Arroyo Naranjo	Emilio Interián Rodríguez
La Habana	Arroyo Naranjo	Juan Esteban Lazo Hernández
La Habana	Arroyo Naranjo	Carlos Alberto Martínez Blanco
La Habana	Arroyo Naranjo	Julia Zoraida Miranda Crespo
La Habana	Arroyo Naranjo	Anayansy María Moret Hernández
La Habana	Cotorro	Mai Lin Alberty Arozarena
La Habana	Cotorro	Pedro Luis Esquivel Moreno
La Habana	Cotorro	Gladys Mercedes López Bejerano
La Habana	Cotorro	Teresa Santana Beltrán
Las Tunas	Manatí	Yuleydis Cruz Betancouort
Las Tunas	Manatí	Yaneidys Pérez Cruz
Las Tunas	Puerto Padre	Teresa María Amarelle Boué
Las Tunas	Puerto Padre	Irma Adelaida Apiau González
Las Tunas	Puerto Padre	Roberto Cabrera Sao
Las Tunas	Puerto Padre	Teresa González Barea
Las Tunas	Puerto Padre	Roger Leyva Chapman
Las Tunas	Jesús Menéndez	Lilian González Rodríguez
Las Tunas	Jesús Menéndez	Ania Pérez Peña
Las Tunas	Majibacoa	Orestes Llanes Mestres
Las Tunas	Majibacoa	Addys Oliver Moreno
Las Tunas	Las Tunas	Idania Margarita Baldoquín Rodríguez
Las Tunas	Las Tunas	Víctor Fidel Gaute López
Las Tunas	Las Tunas	Marilyn Quirina Jomarrón Miranda
Las Tunas	Las Tunas	Ernesto Enrique Parra Borroto
Las Tunas	Las Tunas	Carmen Mercedes Pérez Tamayo
Las Tunas	Las Tunas	Carlos Manuel Quesada Borges
Las Tunas	Las Tunas	Julio César Reyes Rivero
Las Tunas	Las Tunas	Arturo Rodríguez Font
Las Tunas	Las Tunas	Sara Iris Rodríguez Ramírez
Las Tunas	Las Tunas	Ariel Santana Santiesteban
Las Tunas	Jobabo	Kenia Machado López
Las Tunas	Jobabo	Yumil Rodríguez Fernández
Las Tunas	Colombia	Ariel Ferrer Jiménez
Las Tunas	Colombia	Aurora del Carmen Ramos de las Heras
Las Tunas	Amancio	Juan Rafael Ruíz Pérez
Las Tunas	Amancio	Armando Torres González
Matanzas	Matanzas	Darianna Beatriz Acuña Polledo
Matanzas	Matanzas	Jorge Crespo Leicea
Matanzas	Matanzas	Yaseline García Smith
Matanzas	Matanzas	Yosiel Landín Gamazo
Matanzas	Matanzas	Orestes Madruga Placencia
Matanzas	Matanzas	René Antonio Mesa Villafaña
Matanzas	Matanzas	Raúl Cirilo Rodríguez Lobaina
Matanzas	Matanzas	Omar Fernando Ruiz Martín
Matanzas	Cárdenas	Jenniffer Bello Martínez
Matanzas	Cárdenas	Yannara Concepción Domínguez
Matanzas	Cárdenas	Sayuri de la Cruz Rodríguez
Matanzas	Cárdenas	Raysel García Cruz
Matanzas	Cárdenas	Carmen Lidia Maden González
Matanzas	Cárdenas	Luís Martínez de Armas
Matanzas	Cárdenas	Marilin Rodríguez Rodríguez
Matanzas	Cárdenas	Estrella Patricia Sánchez Berrio
Matanzas	Martí	Arístides Lázaro García Herrera
Matanzas	Martí	Tatiana de la Caridad Tabío Villaurrutia
Matanzas	Colón	Belkys Alfonso Biart
Matanzas	Colón	Tania León Silveira
Matanzas	Colón	Pablo Odén Marichal Rodríguez
Matanzas	Colón	Adelisa Rivera Quintana
Matanzas	Perico	Reynaldo Catalá Barranco
Matanzas	Perico	Manuela Teresa Rojas Monzón
Matanzas	Jovellanos	Leidymara de la Caridad Cárdenas lsasi
Matanzas	Jovellanos	Ileana Amparo Flores Morales
Matanzas	Jovellanos	Yosel Pérez Pérez
Matanzas	Pedro Betancourt	Isdalis Rodríguez Rodríguez
Matanzas	Pedro Betancourt	Miguel Ángel Zamora Pérez
Matanzas	Limonar	Ihosvany Cruz Pita
Matanzas	Limonar	Odalys García Pérez
Matanzas	Unión de Reyes	Julio César Gandarilla Bermejo
Matanzas	Unión de Reyes	Marianela Ortega Socorro
Matanzas	Ciénaga de Zapata	Yuriet Estévez Gutiérrez
Matanzas	Ciénaga de Zapata	Ariel Mantecón Ramos
Matanzas	Jagüey Grande	José Ramón Fernández Álvarez
Matanzas	Jagüey Grande	Leyda Finalé de la Cruz
Matanzas	Jagüey Grande	Minerva Alina García Pérez
Matanzas	Calimete	Liliam Mendoza Estrada
Matanzas	Calimete	Ibrahim Santos Hernández
Matanzas	Los Arabos	Lisandra Hidalgo Martínez
Matanzas	Los Arabos	Mary Blanca Ortega Barredo
Mayabeque	Bejucal	Yamilka Acosta Álvarez
Mayabeque	Bejucal	Yansi María Bravo O’Farrill
Mayabeque	San José de las Lajas	Homero Acosta Álvarez
Mayabeque	San José de las Lajas	Nereyda Álvarez Hernández
Mayabeque	San José de las Lajas	Katia Hidalgo Salomón
Mayabeque	San José de las Lajas	Tamara Valido Benítez
Mayabeque	Jaruco	Yomary Teresa Cordoví García
Mayabeque	Jaruco	Ismaris Díaz Cabrera
Mayabeque	Santa Cruz del Norte	Miriam Brito Sarroca
Mayabeque	Santa Cruz del Norte	Melba Zamora O'Farrill
Mayabeque	Madruga	Rivil Morejón Neira
Mayabeque	Madruga	Adianez Taboada Zamora
Mayabeque	Nueva Paz	José Antonio Carrillo Gómez
Mayabeque	Nueva Paz	Dairis Méndez Soler
Mayabeque	San Nicolás	Juan Miguel García Díaz
Mayabeque	San Nicolás	Lellani Mesa Scull
Mayabeque	Güines	José Ariel Cantero Barreto
Mayabeque	Güines	Aramís Padilla Martínez
Mayabeque	Güines	Salvador Antonio Valdés Mesa
Mayabeque	Melena del Sur	Abelardo Álvarez Gil
Mayabeque	Melena del Sur	Vivian Cruz Abreu
Mayabeque	Batabanó	Julio Cesar García García
Mayabeque	Batabanó	Luis Alberto Romero Mesa
Mayabeque	Quivicán	Marisol Castillo Lima
Mayabeque	Quivicán	Alicia de la Caridad Fernández Miranda
Isla de la Juventud	Isla de la Juventud	Arelys Casañola Quintana
Isla de la Juventud	Isla de la Juventud	Yuladis García Segura
Isla de la Juventud	Isla de la Juventud	Yailin Orta Rivera
Isla de la Juventud	Isla de la Juventud	Ernesto Reinoso Piñera
Pinar del Río	Sandino	Zulema Corrales Aroche
Pinar del Río	Sandino	Caridad del Rosario Diego Bello
Pinar del Río	Mantua	Clara Ondina Batista Cruz
Pinar del Río	Mantua	Carlos Rafael Miranda Martínez
Pinar del Río	Minas de Matahambre	Omar Machín Lemus
Pinar del Río	Minas de Matahambre	José Cabrera Cabrera
Pinar del Río	Viñales	Luis Miguel Martínez Hernández
Pinar del Río	Viñales	Yaisa Pereda Martínez
Pinar del Río	La Palma	Maitée Cabrera Castillo
Pinar del Río	La Palma	Gladys Martínez Verdecia
Pinar del Río	Los Palacios	Pedro Miguel Asterio Pérez Betancourt
Pinar del Río	Los Palacios	Marcy Reinoso Torres
Pinar del Río	Consolación del Sur	Caridad Acosta Acosta
Pinar del Río	Consolación del Sur	María del Carmen Concepción González
Pinar del Río	Consolación del Sur	Regla María Ferrer Domínguez
Pinar del Río	Consolación del Sur	Mijaín López Núñez
Pinar del Río	Pinar del Río	Ernesto Barreto Castillo
Pinar del Río	Pinar del Río	Roberto Díaz Menéndez
Pinar del Río	Pinar del Río	Yolanda Ferrer Gómez
Pinar del Río	Pinar del Río	Deborah María Henríquez Lorenzo
Pinar del Río	Pinar del Río	Luis Enrique Martínez Hernández
Pinar del Río	Pinar del Río	Miladys Orraca Castillo
Pinar del Río	Pinar del Río	Abel Prieto Jiménez
Pinar del Río	Pinar del Río	Juana Rafaela Puerto Corvea
Pinar del Río	Pinar del Río	Juan Carlos Rodríguez Díaz
Pinar del Río	Pinar del Río	Daniel Silva Rojas
Pinar del Río	San Luis	Ariel Díaz Núñez
Pinar del Río	San Luis	Manuel Milián Villar
Pinar del Río	San Juan y Martínez	Maritza Colombe Chala
Pinar del Río	San Juan y Martínez	Elizabeth Blanco Rivera
Pinar del Río	Guane	Belkys Pérez Cruz
Pinar del Río	Guane	Wilfredo Romero Moreno
Sancti Spíritus	Yaguajay	Marta Ayala Ávila
Sancti Spíritus	Yaguajay	Javier Brito Pérez
Sancti Spíritus	Yaguajay	Magalys María Sairo Agramonte
Sancti Spíritus	Jatibonico	Teresita Romero Rodríguez
Sancti Spíritus	Jatibonico	Marta Luisa Uriarte García
Sancti Spíritus	Taguasco	Juan Antonio Borrego Díaz
Sancti Spíritus	Taguasco	Magaly Rodríguez Pérez
Sancti Spíritus	Cabaiguán	Lester Alain Alemán Hurtado
Sancti Spíritus	Cabaiguán	Yaquelin de la Paz Ramos
Sancti Spíritus	Cabaiguán	Yolanda Rosario Gómez Cadalso
Sancti Spíritus	Fomento	Aleida Arteaga Mort
Sancti Spíritus	Fomento	Manuel Rivero Abella
Sancti Spíritus	Trinidad	Gloria Marisely Arrechea Malibrán
Sancti Spíritus	Trinidad	Tania Gutiérrez Fontanills
Sancti Spíritus	Trinidad	Victor Manuel Lemagne Sánchez
Sancti Spíritus	Trinidad	Concepción Esperanza Lozano Mendoza
Sancti Spíritus	Sancti Spíritus	Mayubi Álvarez Román
Sancti Spíritus	Sancti Spíritus	Miladys González Rodríguez
Sancti Spíritus	Sancti Spíritus	Alexis Lorente Jiménez
Sancti Spíritus	Sancti Spíritus	Jesús Gerardo Martín Casanova
Sancti Spíritus	Sancti Spíritus	Jose Ramón Monteagudo Ruiz
Sancti Spíritus	Sancti Spíritus	María Esther Reus González
Sancti Spíritus	Sancti Spíritus	Anay Lourdes Valdés Milián
Sancti Spíritus	La Sierpe	Yílian Díaz Meneses
Sancti Spíritus	La Sierpe	Oscar Luis Hung Pentón
Santiago de Cuba	Contramaestre	Mayitsi del Toro Fonseca
Santiago de Cuba	Contramaestre	Wilmer Guevara Frómeta
Santiago de Cuba	Contramaestre	Rosa Moracén Rosales
Santiago de Cuba	Contramaestre	Lourdes María Palau Vázquez
Santiago de Cuba	Contramaestre	Elizabeth Peña Turruellas
Santiago de Cuba	Mella	Omara Durand Elías
Santiago de Cuba	Mella	Nilvia Hechavarria Fuentes
Santiago de Cuba	San Luis	Ismael Drullet Pérez
Santiago de Cuba	San Luis	Bárbara Idalia Jurquet Medina
Santiago de Cuba	San Luis	Diana Sedal Yanes
Santiago de Cuba	San Luis	Midelis Vicet Fernández
Santiago de Cuba	Segundo Frente	Raúl Castro Ruz
Santiago de Cuba	Segundo Frente	Yarisandi Hechavarría Carmenaty
Santiago de Cuba	Songo - La Maya	Marisol López Ortiz
Santiago de Cuba	Songo - La Maya	Antonio Enrique Lussón Batlle
Santiago de Cuba	Songo - La Maya	Alexis Mora Sarmiento
Santiago de Cuba	Songo - La Maya	Yoraida Núñez Bello
Santiago de Cuba	Songo - La Maya	Yudith Rodríguez Herrera
Santiago de Cuba	Santiago de Cuba	Yulianne Babastro Marrón
Santiago de Cuba	Santiago de Cuba	José Ramón Balaguer Cabrera
Santiago de Cuba	Santiago de Cuba	José Gonzalo Borrero Sotomayor
Santiago de Cuba	Santiago de Cuba	Lourdes Milagros Caballero Garzón
Santiago de Cuba	Santiago de Cuba	Giselly Cruz Santo
Santiago de Cuba	Santiago de Cuba	Yarlenis Díaz Gómez
Santiago de Cuba	Santiago de Cuba	Sannia Esquivel Romero
Santiago de Cuba	Santiago de Cuba	Lázaro Expósito
Santiago de Cuba	Santiago de Cuba	Raúl Fornés Valenciano
Santiago de Cuba	Santiago de Cuba	Fernando González Llort
Santiago de Cuba	Santiago de Cuba	Yandre Guillot Coureaux
Santiago de Cuba	Santiago de Cuba	Liette Esther Herrera González
Santiago de Cuba	Santiago de Cuba	Beatriz Johnson Urrutia
Santiago de Cuba	Santiago de Cuba	Suniel Johnson Valenciano
Santiago de Cuba	Santiago de Cuba	Mariucha Eduviges Lenzano Pascual
Santiago de Cuba	Santiago de Cuba	Álvaro López Miera
Santiago de Cuba	Santiago de Cuba	Sara Mengana Drago
Santiago de Cuba	Santiago de Cuba	Liliana Mengana Orozco
Santiago de Cuba	Santiago de Cuba	Martha Mesa Valenciano
Santiago de Cuba	Santiago de Cuba	José Angel Portal
Santiago de Cuba	Santiago de Cuba	Joaquín Quintas Solá
Santiago de Cuba	Santiago de Cuba	Gloria María Ruiz Morell
Santiago de Cuba	Santiago de Cuba	Zuria Salmón Álvarez
Santiago de Cuba	Santiago de Cuba	Leudis Tejeda Barrios
Santiago de Cuba	Santiago de Cuba	Eduardo Moisés Torres Cuevas
Santiago de Cuba	Santiago de Cuba	Yaquelín Wanton Speck
Santiago de Cuba	Palma Soriano	Magaly Benítez Zamora
Santiago de Cuba	Palma Soriano	María de los Ángeles Cordero Tamayo
Santiago de Cuba	Palma Soriano	Carlos Ernesto Girón Márquez
Santiago de Cuba	Palma Soriano	Luis Marino Portuondo Ramírez
Santiago de Cuba	Palma Soriano	Ulises Rosales del Toro
Santiago de Cuba	Palma Soriano	Ena Elsa Velázquez Cobiella
Santiago de Cuba	Tercer Frente	Tania Cabrera Mariño
Santiago de Cuba	Tercer Frente	Felipe Martínez Suárez
Santiago de Cuba	Guamá	Manuel Falcón Hernández
Santiago de Cuba	Guamá	Ramón Velázquez Núñez
Villa Clara	Corralillo	María de los Ángeles Díaz Rodríguez
Villa Clara	Corralillo	Neysi Amalia Santos Silva
Villa Clara	Quemado de Güines	Adisvey Gálvez Juvier
Villa Clara	Quemado de Güines	Ana María Mari Machado
Villa Clara	Sagua la Grande	Aurora González Sánchez
Villa Clara	Sagua la Grande	Julio Ramiro Lima Corzo
Villa Clara	Sagua la Grande	José Ramón Saborido Loidi
Villa Clara	Encrucijada	Julio Enrique Morales Verea
Villa Clara	Encrucijada	Celina Margarita Ruiz Rodríguez
Villa Clara	Camajuaní	Gustavo Ricardo Montesino Reyes
Villa Clara	Camajuaní	Esther Lidia Pérez Coello
Villa Clara	Camajuaní	Osviel Isvey Rodríguez Seijo
Villa Clara	Caibarién	Idalia Jiménez Fuentes
Villa Clara	Caibarién	Liem Ofarrill Mons
Villa Clara	Remedios	Bárbara María Hernández Hernández
Villa Clara	Remedios	Antonio Alberto Pérez Santos
Villa Clara	Placetas	Alpidio Bautista Alonso Grau
Villa Clara	Placetas	Andrés Castro Alegría
Villa Clara	Placetas	Odalys González Sánchez
Villa Clara	Santa Clara	Asiel Aguada Barceló
Villa Clara	Santa Clara	Clara Nubia Aliaga Castillo
Villa Clara	Santa Clara	Miguel Díaz-Canel Bermúdez
Villa Clara	Santa Clara	Manuel Guerra Garcés
Villa Clara	Santa Clara	Alberto López Díaz
Villa Clara	Santa Clara	Roberto López Hernández
Villa Clara	Santa Clara	Belkis María López Vázquez
Villa Clara	Santa Clara	Luis Morlote Rivas
Villa Clara	Santa Clara	Yaritza Moya Caballero
Villa Clara	Santa Clara	María Teresa Pérez Guillén
Villa Clara	Santa Clara	Omar Isidoro Pérez Gómez
Villa Clara	Santa Clara	Anabel Treto de la Paz
Villa Clara	Cifuentes	Ania Maria Aparicio Albelo
Villa Clara	Cifuentes	Alexander Jiménez Machado
Villa Clara	Santo Domingo	Joaquín Miguel Bernal Rodríguez
Villa Clara	Santo Domingo	Martha Mena Rodríguez
Villa Clara	Santo Domingo	Sergio Juan Rodríguez Morales
Villa Clara	Ranchuelo	Lina Pedraza Rodríguez
Villa Clara	Ranchuelo	Milaxy Yanet Sánchez Armas
Villa Clara	Ranchuelo	Jesús Arturo Satorre Ygualada
Villa Clara	Manicaragua	Minoska Cadalso Navarro
Villa Clara	Manicaragua	Yoerky Sánchez Cuéllar
Villa Clara	Manicaragua	Adolfo Sergio Valdés Guillén
