= Urbano Noris =

- Municipality
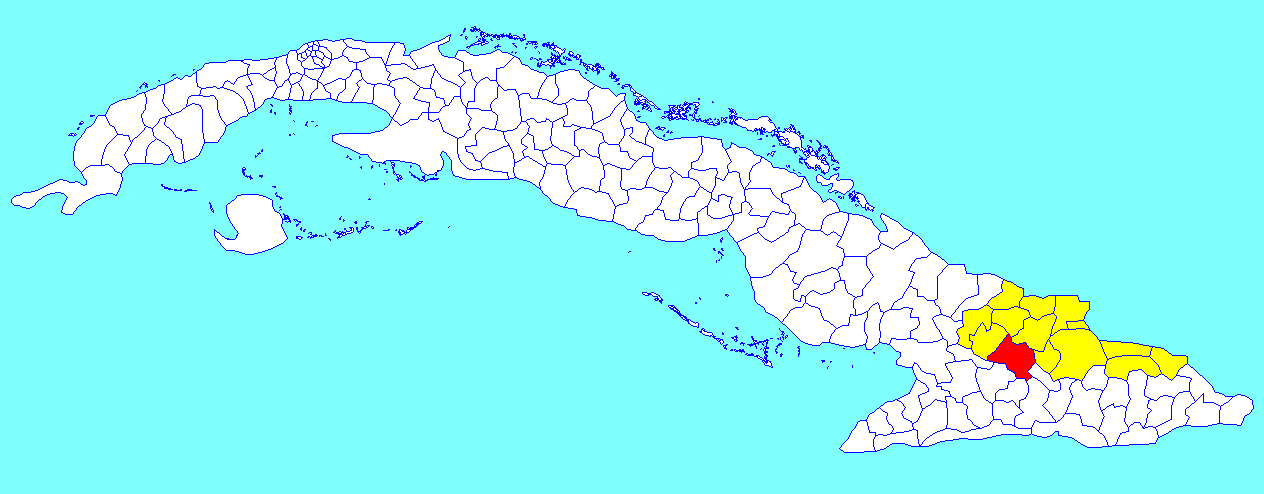
- Urbano Noris municipality (red) within Holguín Province (yellow) and Cuba
- Coordinates: 20°36′4″N 76°07′57″W
- Country: Cuba
- Province: Holguín
- Seat: San Germán

Area
  - Total: 846 km^{2} (327 sq mi)
- Elevation: 105 m (344 ft)

Population (2022)
  - Total: 38,097
  - Density: 45.0/km^{2} (117/sq mi)
- Time zone: UTC-5 (EST)
- Area code: +53-24

Urbano Noris is a municipality and city in the Holguín Province of Cuba. The municipal seat is located in the town of San Germán.

== Geography ==
The municipality is located southeast of the province, neighboring the provinces of Granma and Santiago de Cuba; and borders with the municipalities of Jiguaní, Cauto Cristo, Cacocum, Holguín, Báguanos, Cueto, Mella, Palma Soriano and Contramaestre. It counts the town of San Germán and the villages of Algodones, Cruce San Francisco, Estrada, Flora, José A. Echeverría, La Caridad, La Ceiba, La Yaya, Las Cuarenta, Paraná, Rey Dos and Santa Cruz.

== Demographics ==
In 2022, the municipality of Urbano Noris had a population of 38,097. With a total area of 846 km^{2} (327 sq mi), it has a population density of 45/km^{2} (120/sq mi).

== See also ==
- Municipalities of Cuba
- List of cities in Cuba
