= Tercer Frente =

- Municipality
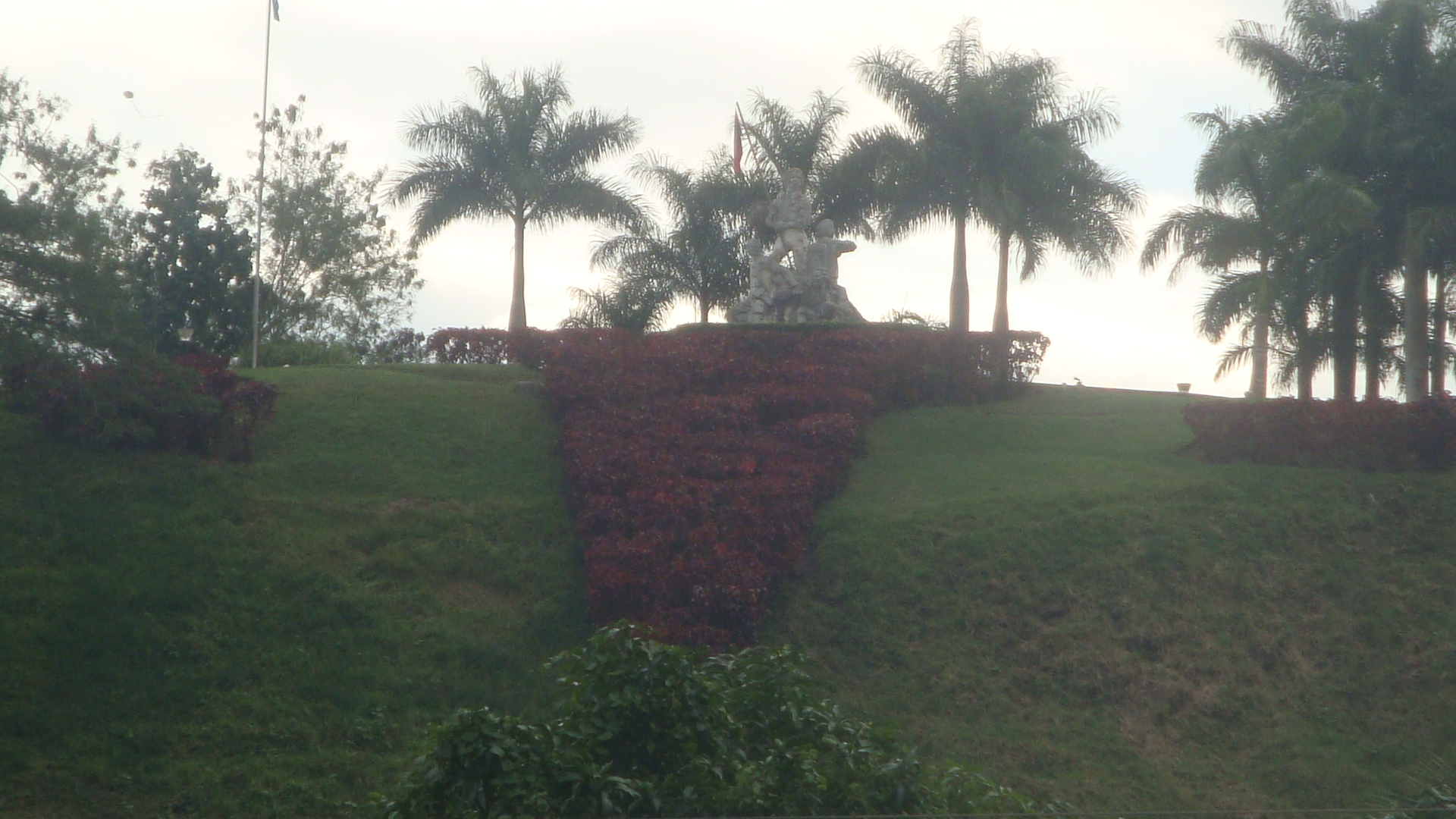
- A mausoleum in Cruce de los Baños

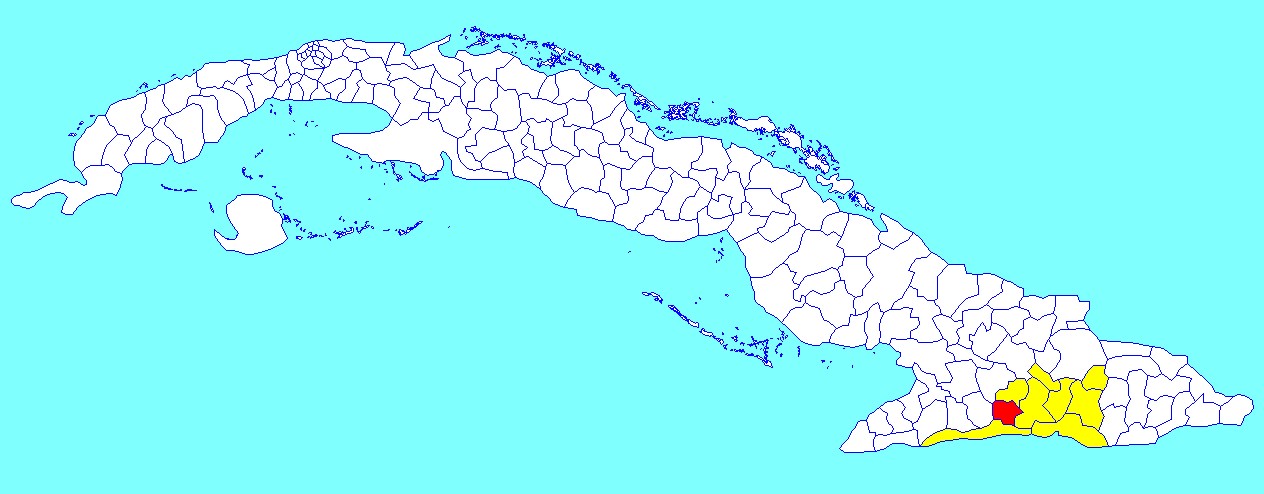
- Tercer Frente municipality (red) within Santiago Province (yellow) and Cuba
- Coordinates: 20°10′19″N 76°19′39″W
- Country: Cuba
- Province: Santiago de Cuba
- Seat: Cruce de los Baños

Area
  - Total: 364.3 km^{2} (140.7 sq mi)
- Elevation: 225 m (738 ft)

Population (2022)
  - Total: 30,237
  - Density: 83.00/km^{2} (215.0/sq mi)
- Time zone: UTC-5 (EST)
- Area code: +53-226
- Website: https://www.tercerfrente.gob.cu/

Tercer Frente (Spanish pronunciation: [teɾˈseɾ ˈfɾente], Spanish for "Third Front") is a municipality in the Santiago de Cuba Province of Cuba. It is centered on the town, and municipal seat, of Cruce de los Baños.

== Geography ==
The municipality is located in the western part of the province, neighboring the province of Granma, and borders with the municipalities of Guisa, Jiguaní, Contramaestre, Palma Soriano and Guamá.

It includes the town of Cruce de los Baños and the villages of El Yayal, Manaca and Matias.

== Demographics ==
In 2022, the municipality of Tercer Frente had a population of 30,237. With a total area of 364 km^{2} (141 sq mi), it has a population density of 83/km^{2} (210/sq mi).

== See also ==
- Municipalities of Cuba
- List of cities in Cuba
