= Baire =

Baire may refer to:

- René-Louis Baire, French mathematician
- Tekeste Baire, Eritrean trade unionist
- Baire Benítez, Cuban chess player
- Baire (Contramaestre), village in the municipality of Contramaestre, Cuba
- Baire (Jiguaní), barrio in the municipality of Jiguaní Cuba
