= Cueto, Cuba =

Cueto
- Municipality
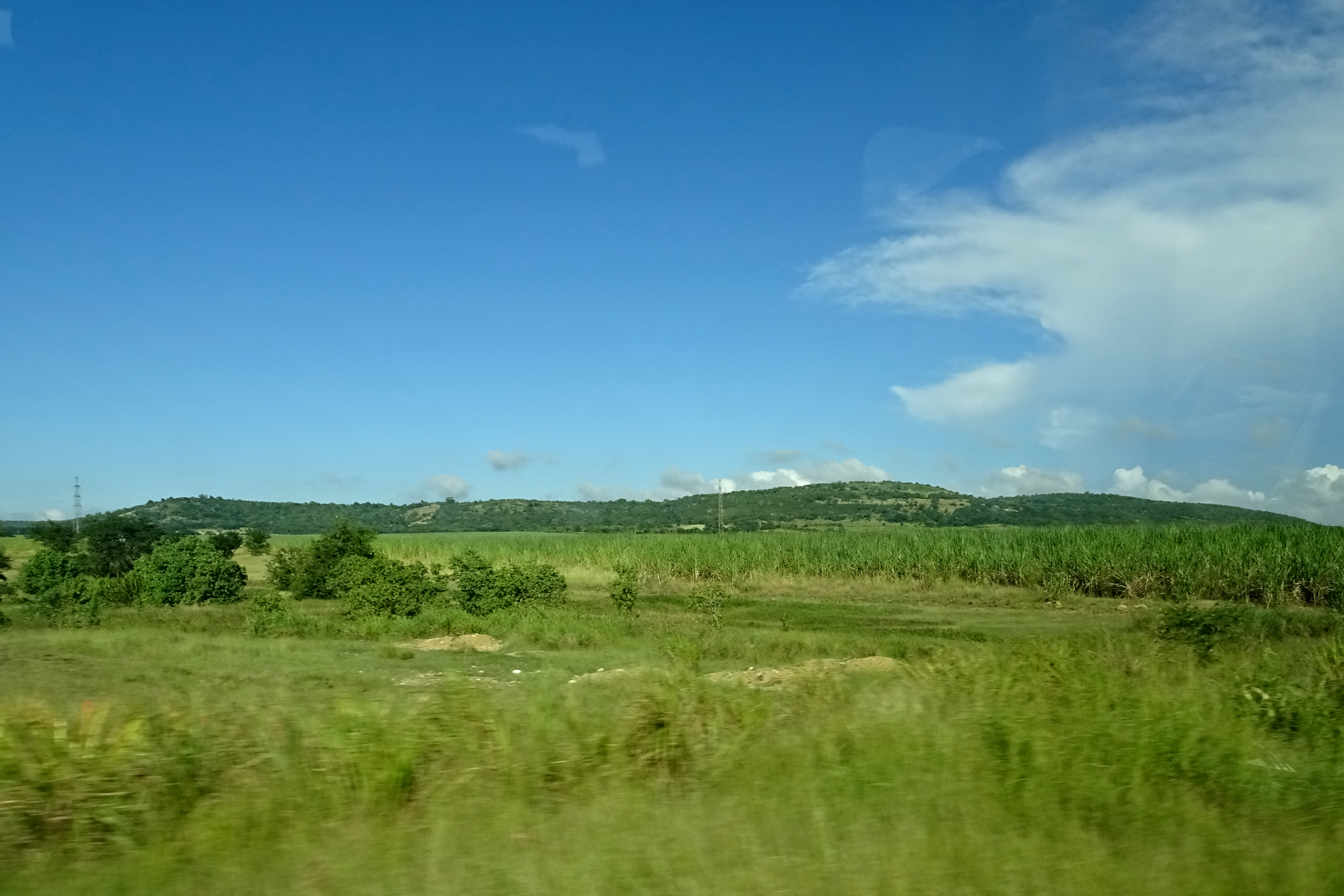
- Near Marcané

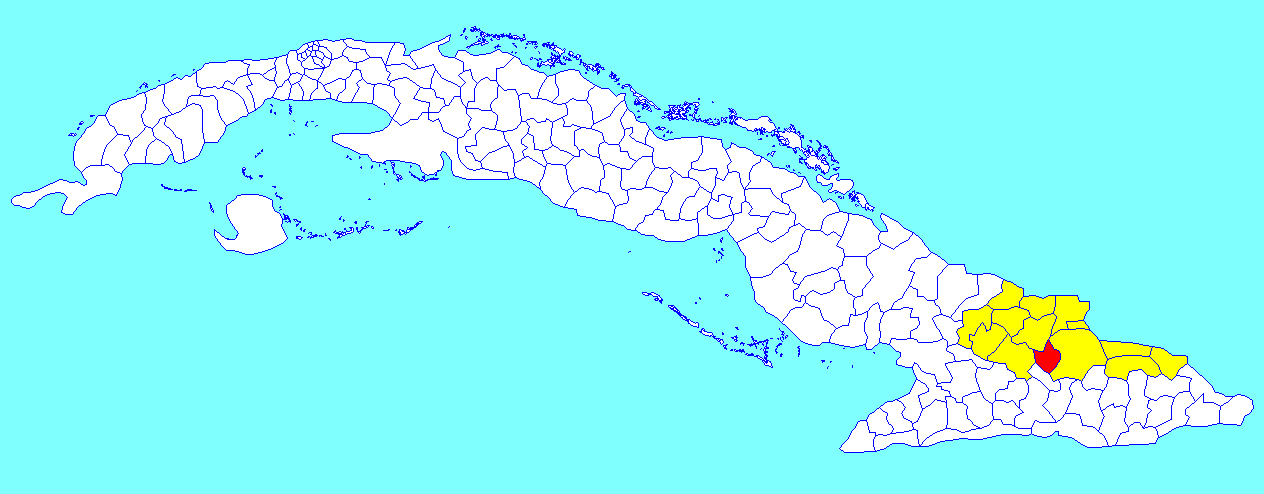
- Cueto municipality (red) within Holguín Province (yellow) and Cuba
- Coordinates: 20°38′53″N 75°55′54″W
- Country: Cuba
- Province: Holguín Province

Area
  - Total: 329 km^{2} (127 sq mi)
- Elevation: 55 m (180 ft)

Population (2018)
  - Total: 31,552
  - Density: 95.9/km^{2} (248/sq mi)
- Time zone: UTC-5 (EST)
- Area code: +53-24

Cueto is a municipality and town in Holguín Province, Cuba.

== Geography ==
The municipality is located southwest of the Holguín Province, next to the border with Santiago de Cuba Province. It borders with the municipalities of Báguanos, Mayarí, Mella and Urbano Noris (San Germán). In addition to Cueto itself, the municipal territory includes the villages of Alto Cedro, Barajagua, Birán, Marcané, and other minor localities.

Birán, best known as the birthplace of Fidel, Raúl and Ramón Castro, was part of the neighboring municipality of Mayarí until the 1976 reform.

== Demographics ==
In 2018, the municipality of Cueto had a population of 31,552, of which 16,308 were men and 15,244 were women With a total area of 329 km^{2} (127 sq mi), it has a population density of 95.9/km^{2} (248/sq mi). The town of Cueto, as of the 2017 census, had a registered population of 15,111 living in just over 11,000 homes.

== Popular culture ==
The name of the town, along with its municipal villages of Alto Cedro and Marcané, figures in the following lyrics of the song Chan Chan, composed in 1984 and released in 1996 by Compay Segundo, and also performed by the Buena Vista Social Club:

De Alto Cedro voy para Marcané

Llego a Cueto voy para Mayarí

From Alto Cedro I go to Marcané

I get to Cueto, then head for Mayarí

The same line is repeated in a chorus of the 2011 song "Buena" by a Polish band Blue Cafe.

== See also ==
- List of cities in Cuba
