= Songo – La Maya =

Songo - La Maya
- Municipality
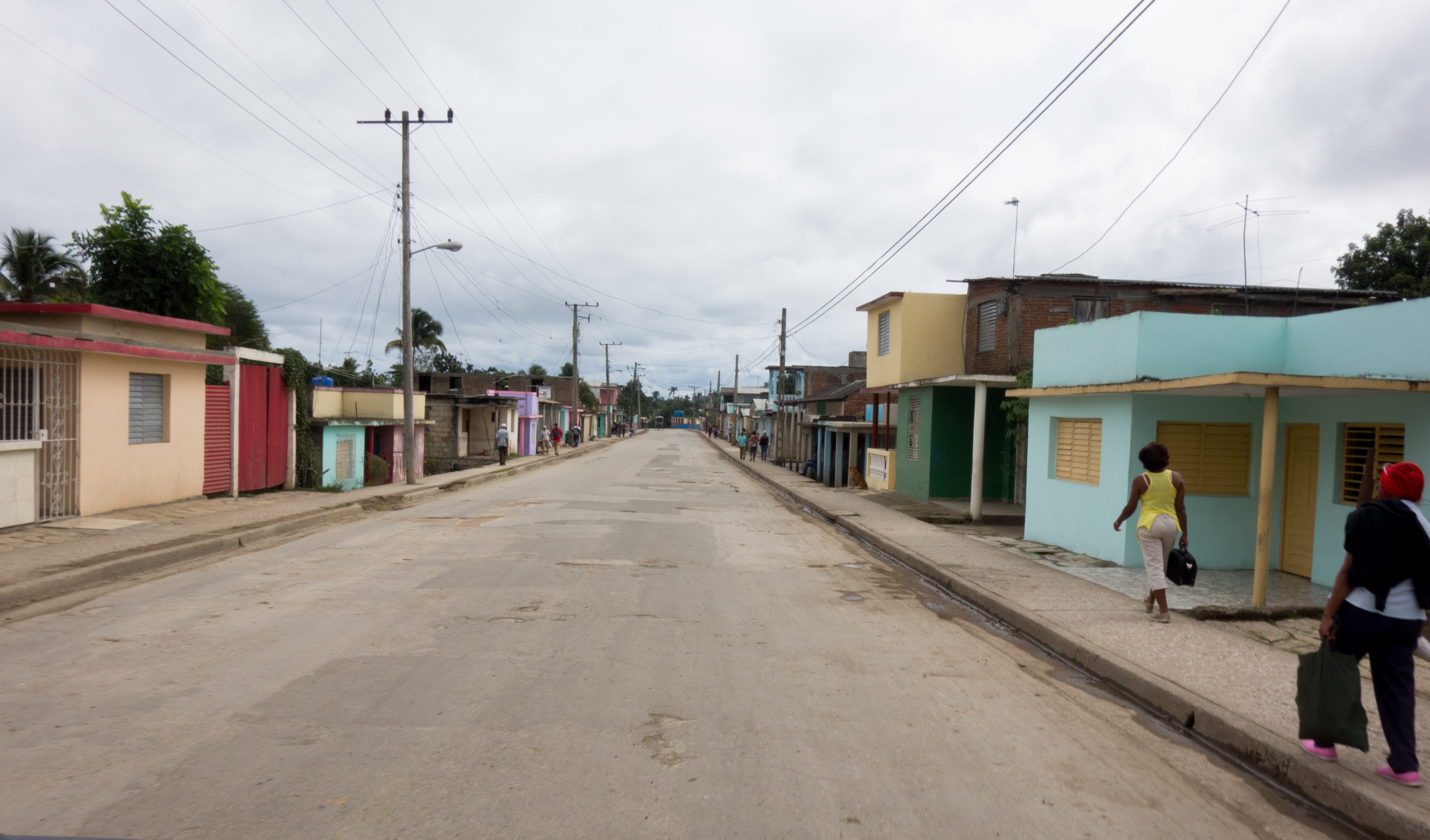
- Main road in La Maya

- Seal

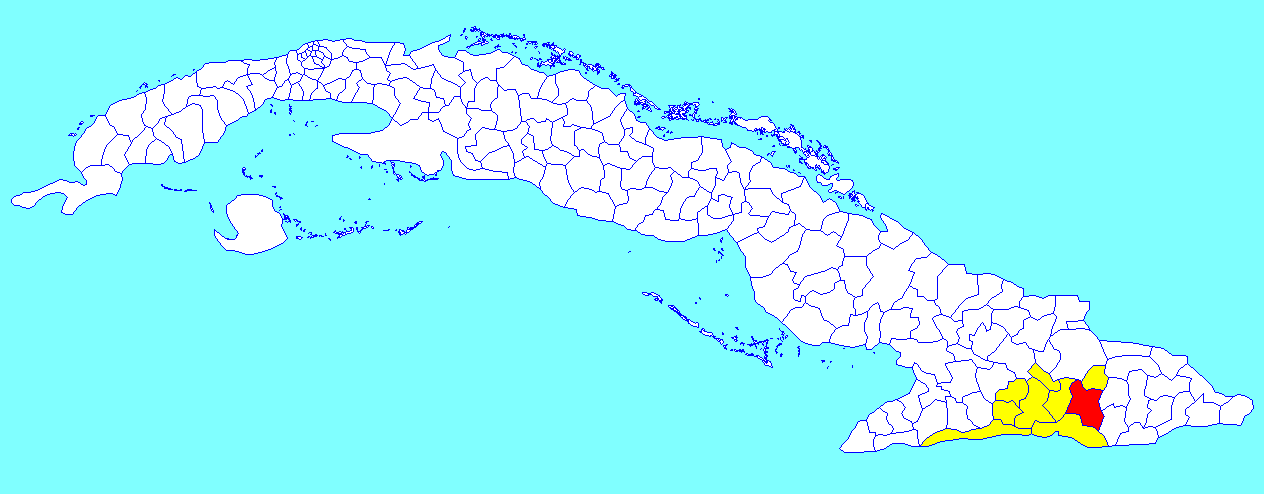
- Songo - La Maya municipality (red) within Santiago Province (yellow) and Cuba
- Coordinates: 20°10′24″N 75°38′47″W
- Country: Cuba
- Province: Santiago de Cuba
- Seat: La Maya
- Founded: 1858 (Alto Songo)
- Incorporated: 1879

Area
  - Total: 720.7 km^{2} (278.3 sq mi)
- Elevation: 225 m (738 ft)

Population (2022)
  - Total: 89,819
  - Density: 124.6/km^{2} (322.8/sq mi)
- Time zone: UTC-5 (EST)
- Area code: +53-226
- Website: https://www.songolamaya.gob.cu/

Songo – La Maya is a municipality in the Santiago de Cuba Province of Cuba. It is located north-east of Santiago de Cuba and is centered on the towns of La Maya (municipal seat) and Alto Songo (or Songo).

== History ==
In 1943, the municipality consisted of the barrios (neighbourhoods) of Florida Blanca, Jarahueca, La Maya, La Sabana, Morón, Norte Cabecera, Palenque, Socorro, Sur Cabecera and Tí Arriba.

== Geography ==
The municipality is located east of the province, neighboring the provinces of Holguín and Guantánamo; and borders with the municipalities of San Luis, Mayarí, Segundo Frente, El Salvador, Niceto Pérez and Santiago de Cuba.

It includes the town of La Maya and the villages of Alto Songo, Belleza, Bolaño, El Manguito, El Piñon, Jagua, Jarahueca, Jurisdicción, Jutinicú, La Perla, La Prueba, La Sabana, Los Reynaldos, Matahambre, Palmarejo, Río Arriba, San Benito del Crucero, Santa Cruz and Yerba de Guinea.

== Demographics ==
In 2022, the municipality of Songo – La Maya had a population of 89,819. With a total area of 721 km^{2} (278 sq mi), it has a population density of 139.2/km^{2} (361/sq mi).

== See also ==
- List of cities in Cuba
