= Contramaestre =

- Municipality
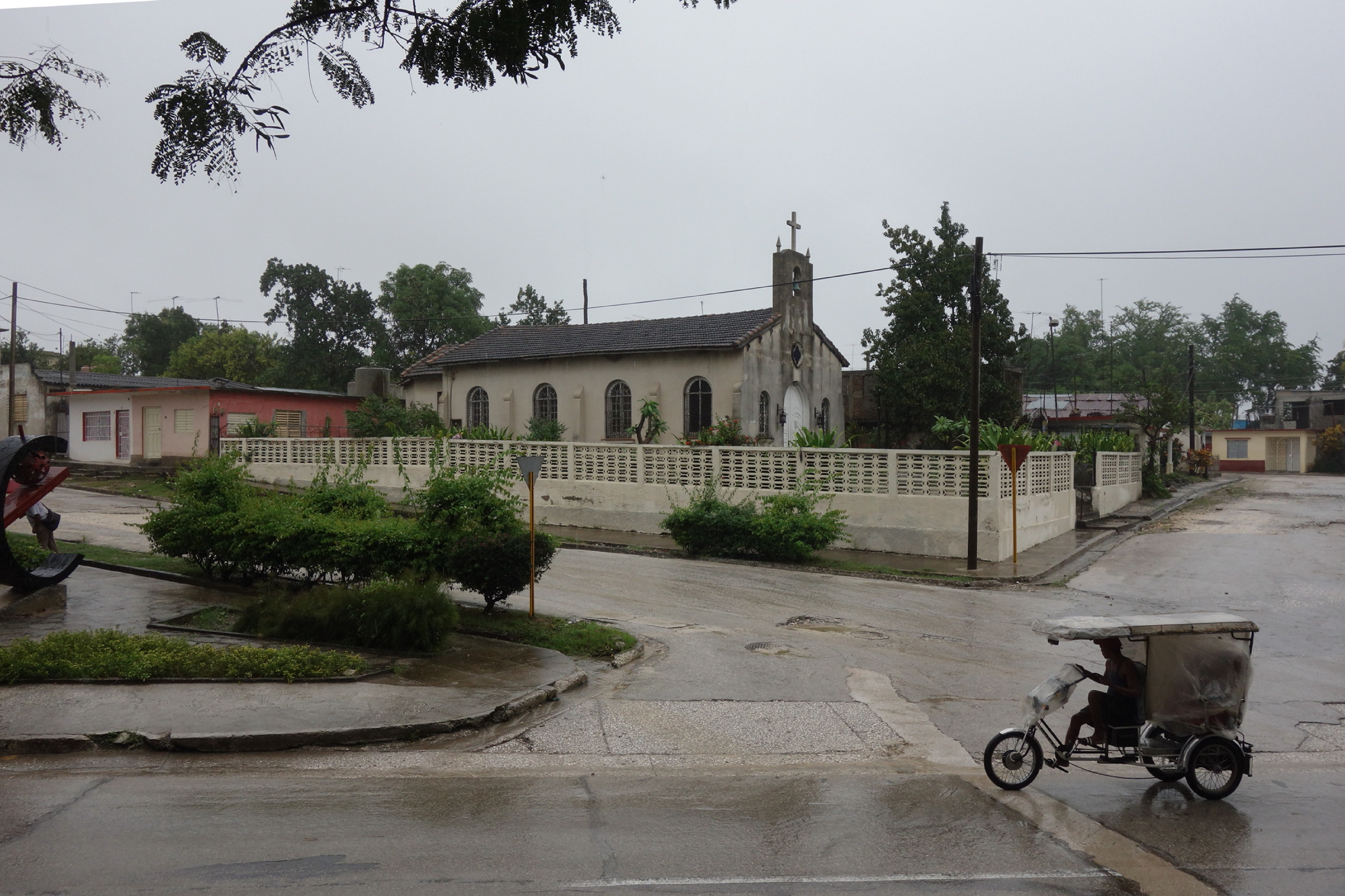
- A church in Contramaestre

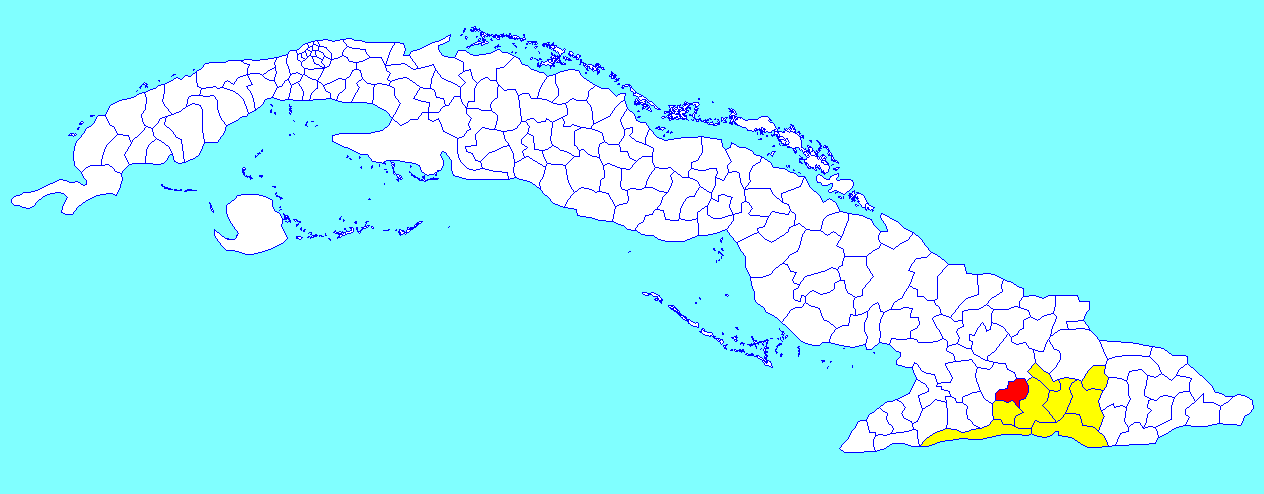
- Contramaestre municipality (red) within Santiago Province (yellow) and Cuba
- Coordinates: 20°18′0″N 76°15′2″W
- Country: Cuba
- Province: Santiago de Cuba

Area
  - Total: 610.3 km^{2} (235.6 sq mi)
- Elevation: 110 m (360 ft)

Population (2022)
  - Total: 104,334
  - Density: 171.0/km^{2} (442.8/sq mi)
- Time zone: UTC-5 (EST)
- Area code: +53-226
- Website: https://www.contramaestre.gob.cu/

Contramaestre (Spanish for "boatswain") is a Cuban town and municipality in the Santiago de Cuba Province.

== Geography ==
The municipality is located in the western part of the province, neighboring the provinces of Granma and Holguín; and borders with the municipalities of Jiguaní, Urbano Noris, Palma Soriano and Tercer Frente.

It includes the villages of Altos de Ventas, Anacahuita, America Libre, Baire, El Naranjo, Guaninao, La Maritonia, Laguna Blanca, Los Negros, Los Pasos, Maffo, Palo Seco, Pino de Baire, Pueblo Nuevo and Xavier.

== Demographics ==
In 2022, municipal population of Contramaestre was of 104,334, of which 44,752 in the town. With a total area of 610 km^{2} (240 sq mi), it has a population density of 166.9/km^{2} (432/sq mi). Contramaestre is known as the land of citrus.

== Infrastructure ==
- Main Hospital: Orlando Pantoja Tamayo (22.July.1988)
- Elementary Schools: Jose de la Luz y Caballero. Semi-internado: Orlando Pantoja T.
- Secondary Schools: Pepito Tey. Rodolfo Rodríguez
- Public Library: Luz Berta Sánchez

== See also ==
- Municipalities of Cuba
- List of cities in Cuba
