= Mella, Cuba =

Mella
- Municipality
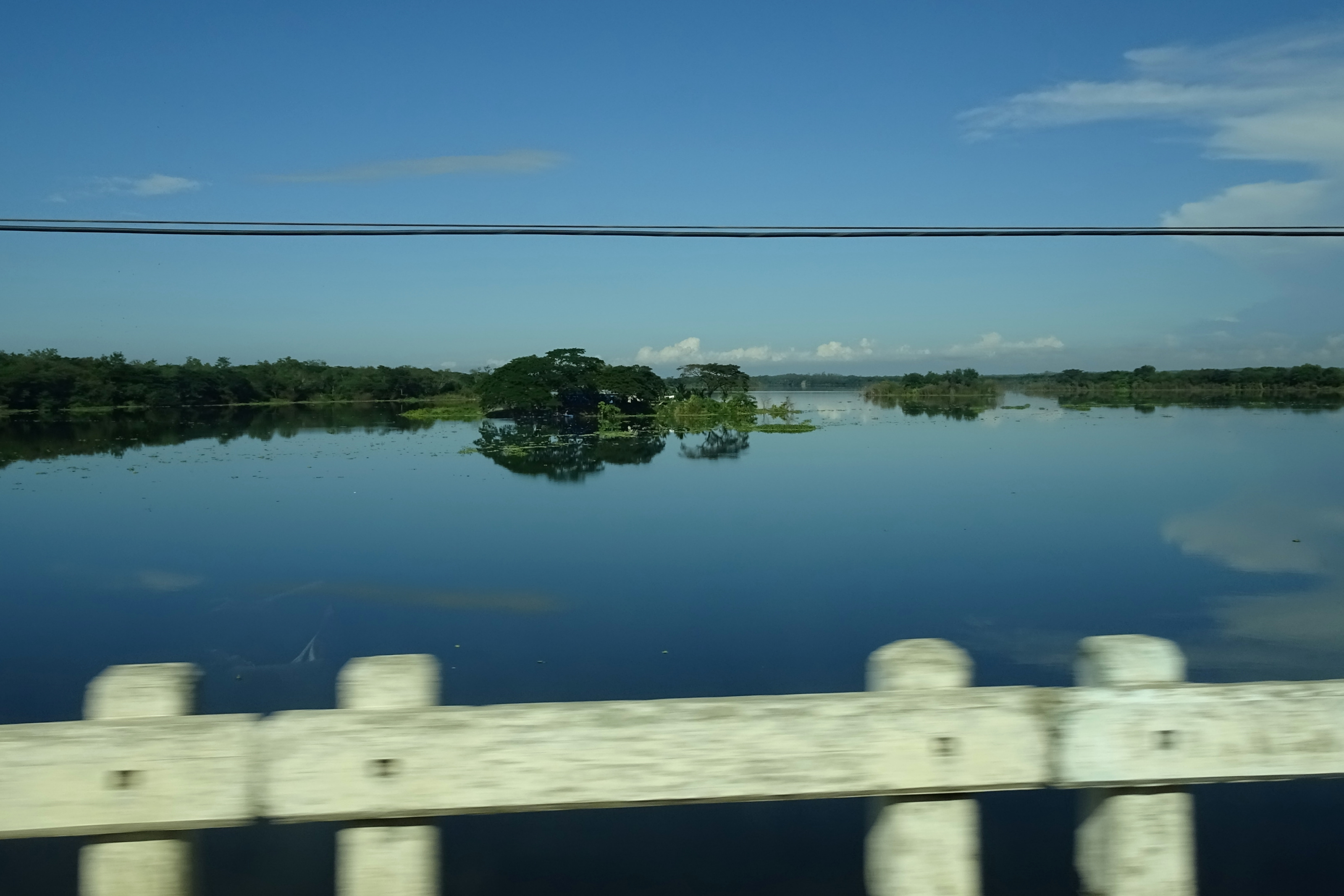
- Protesta de Baragua reservoir

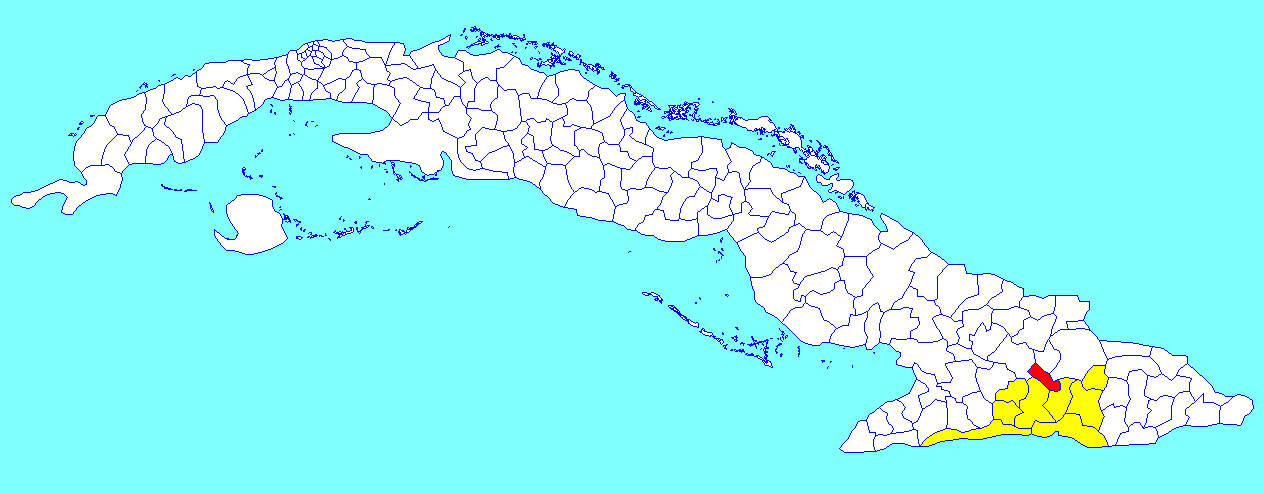
- Mella municipality (red) within Santiago Province (yellow) and Cuba
- Coordinates: 20°22′10″N 75°54′40″W
- Country: Cuba
- Province: Santiago de Cuba

Area
  - Total: 335.2 km^{2} (129.4 sq mi)
- Elevation: 120 m (390 ft)

Population (2022)
  - Total: 34,031
  - Density: 101.5/km^{2} (262.9/sq mi)
- Time zone: UTC-5 (EST)
- Area code: +53-226
- Website: https://www.amppmella.gob.cu/

Mella is a town and municipality in the Santiago de Cuba Province of Cuba. It is located 20 km (12 mi) north of Palma Soriano and was named after the Cuban revolutionary and communist Julio Antonio Mella.

In addition to Mella itself, the municipality includes the population centers of Mangos de Baraguá, Palmarito de Cauto, Regina, and other minor villages.

== Demographics ==
In 2022, the municipality of Mella had a population of 34,031. With a total area of 335 km^{2} (129 sq mi), it has a population density of 100.4/km^{2} (260/sq mi).

== Twin Town ==
- Castel San Giorgio, Italy

== See also ==
- List of cities in Cuba
- Municipalities of Cuba
