= List of cities in Cuba =

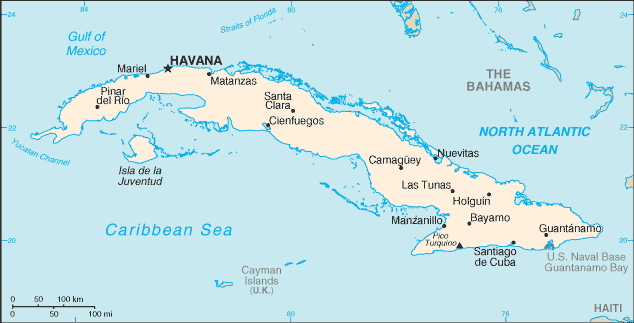
Map of Cuba

This is a list of cities in Cuba with at least 20,000 inhabitants, listed in descending order. Population data refers to city proper and not to the whole municipality, because they include large rural areas with several villages. All figures are accurate as of 2012 and provincial capitals are shown in bold.

== List ==
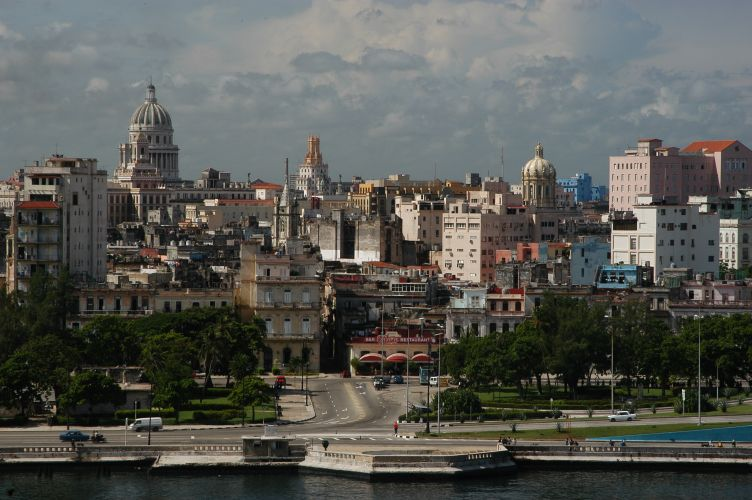
1. Havana, the capital of Cuba

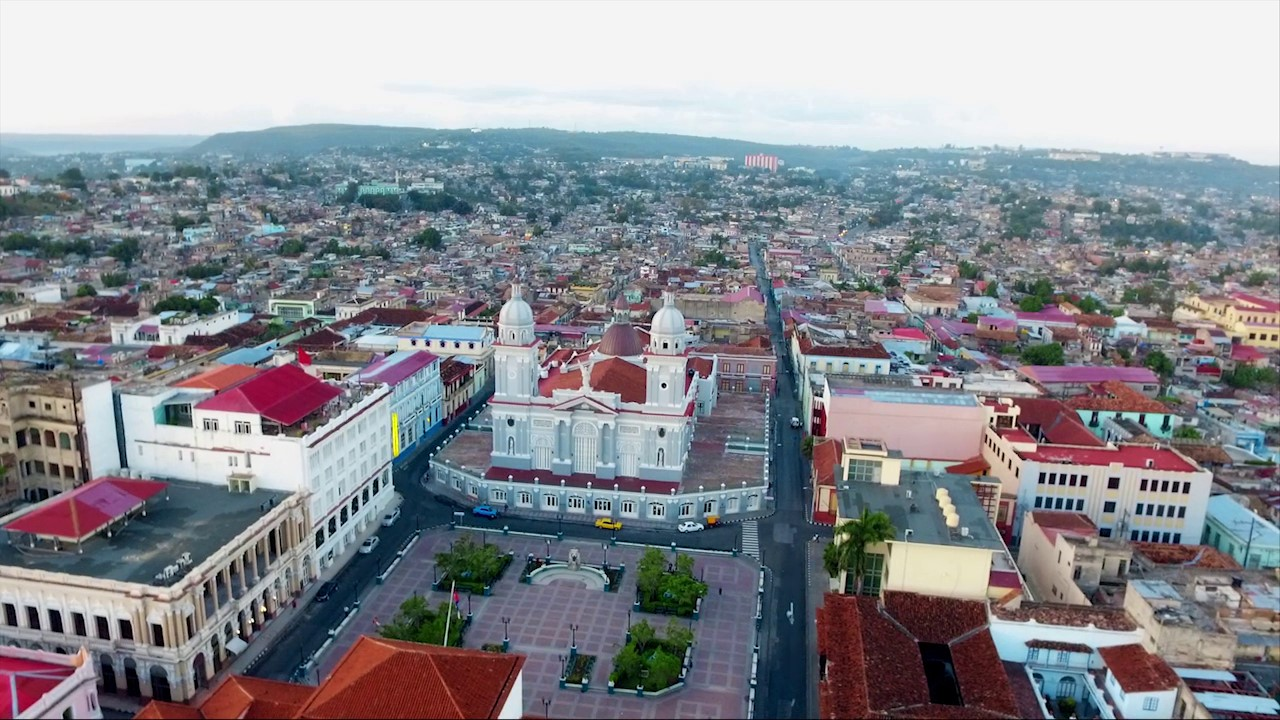
2. Santiago de Cuba, the second largest city

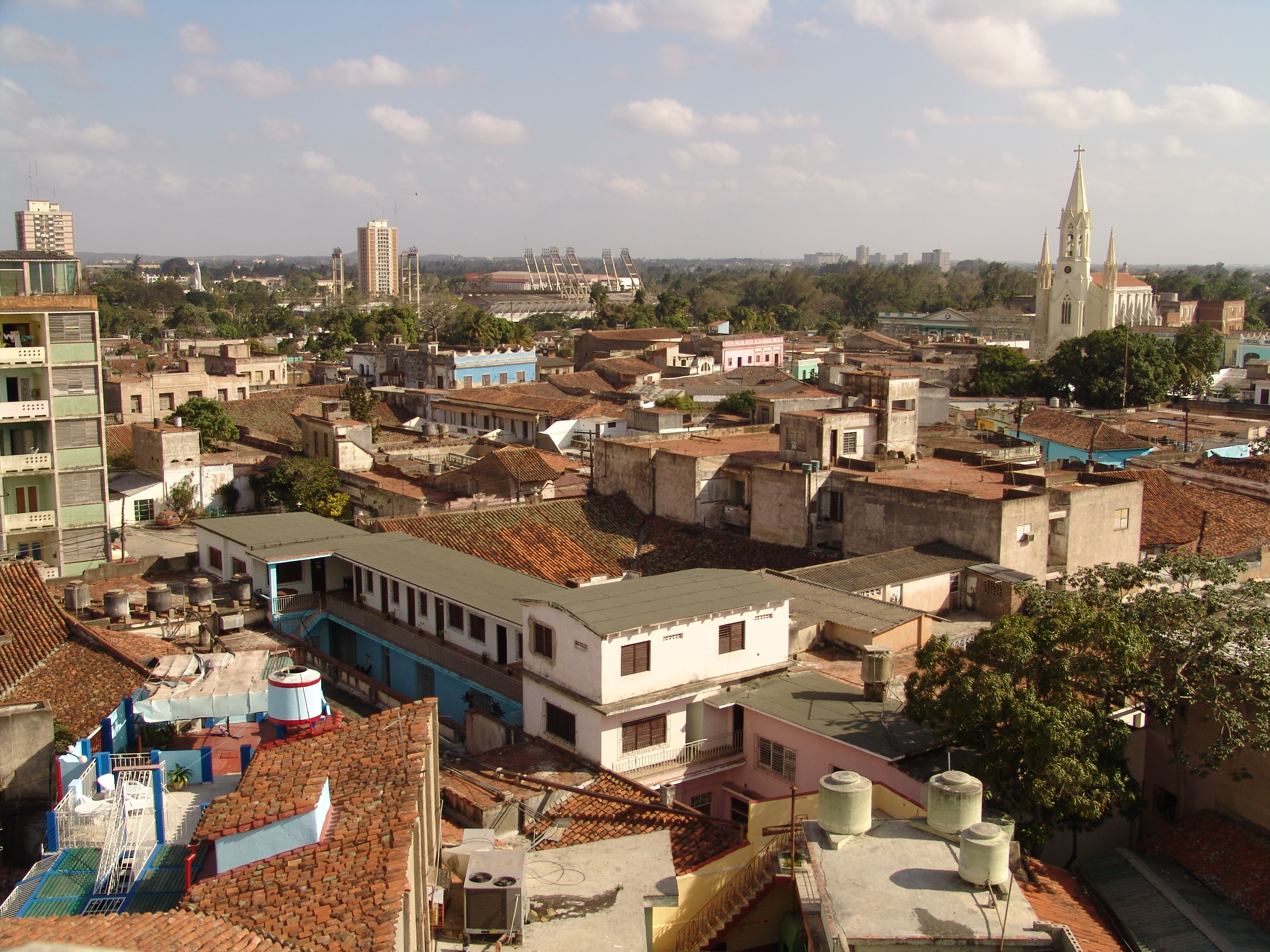
3. Camagüey

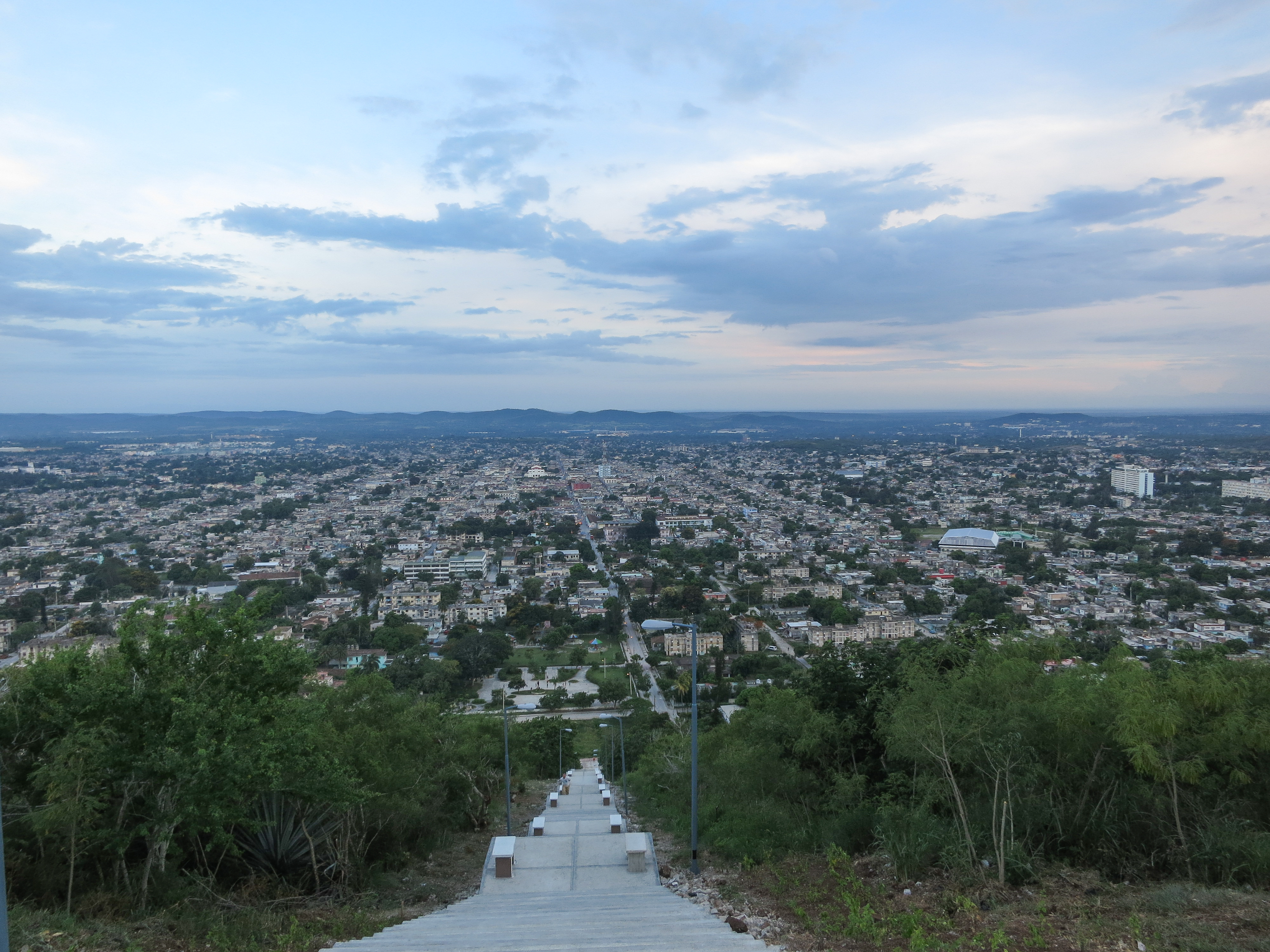
4. Holguín

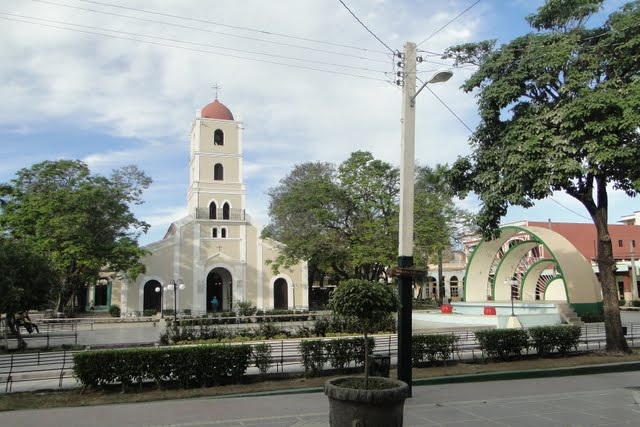
5. Guantánamo

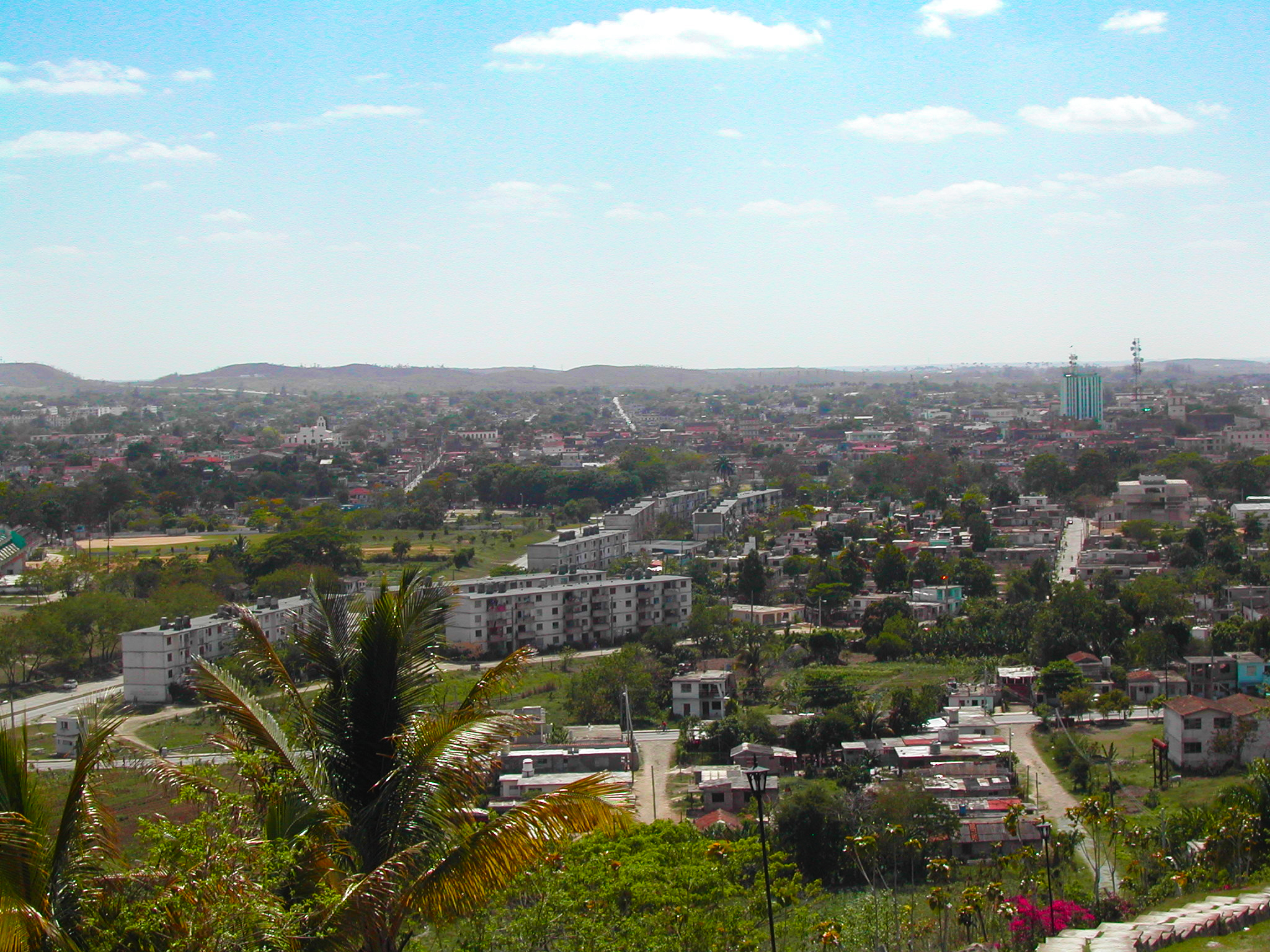
6. Santa Clara

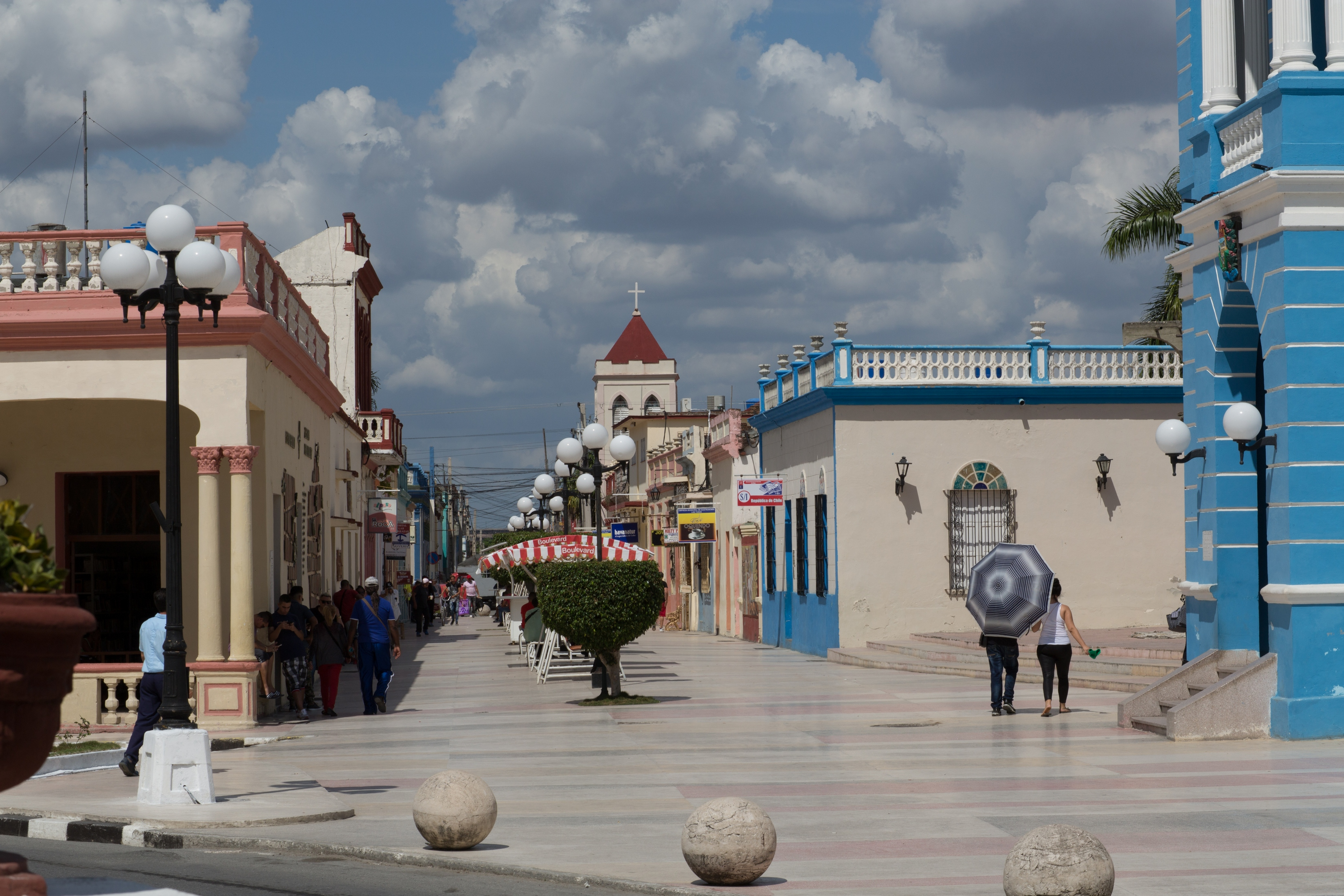
7. Las Tunas

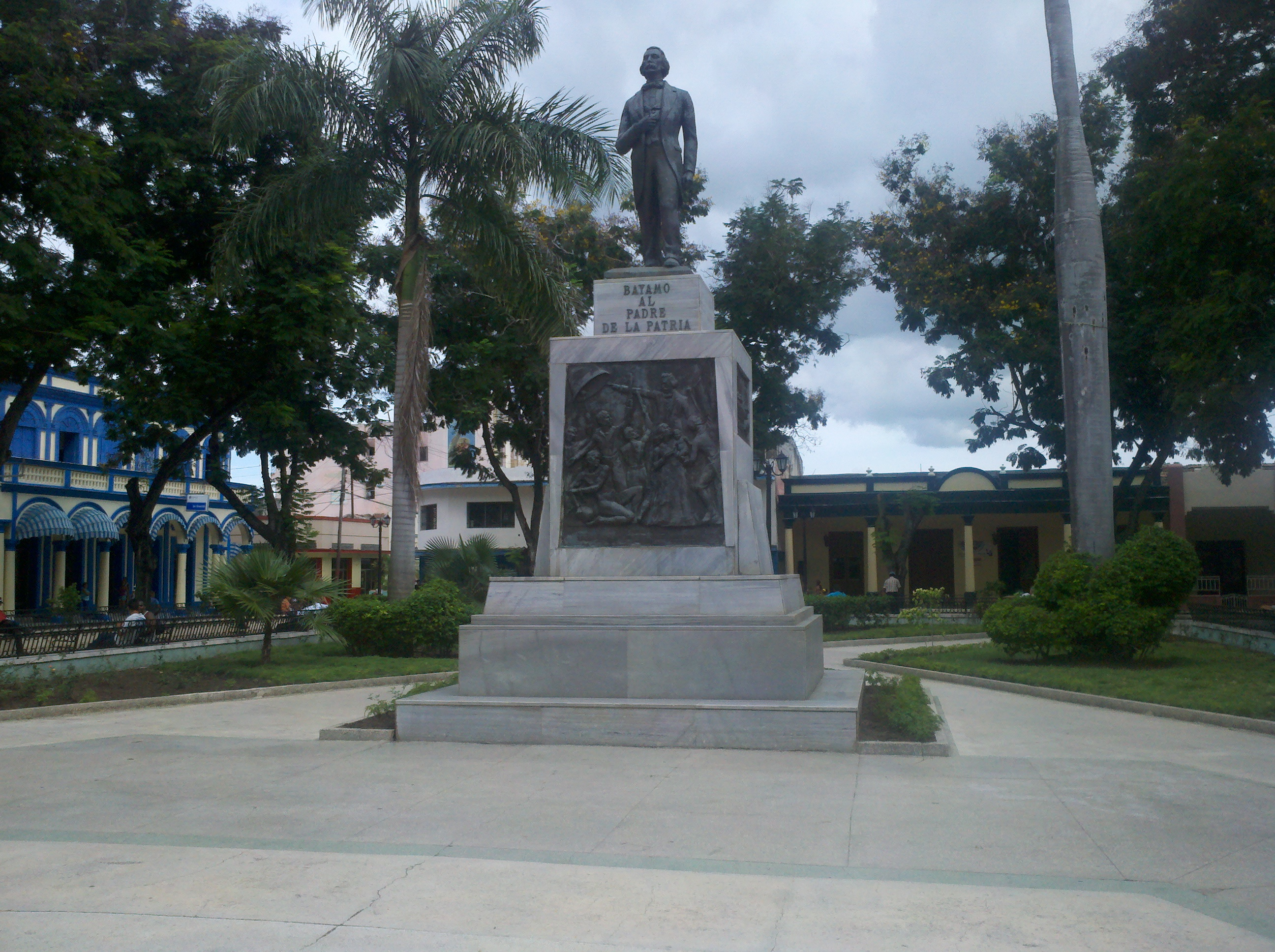
8. Bayamo

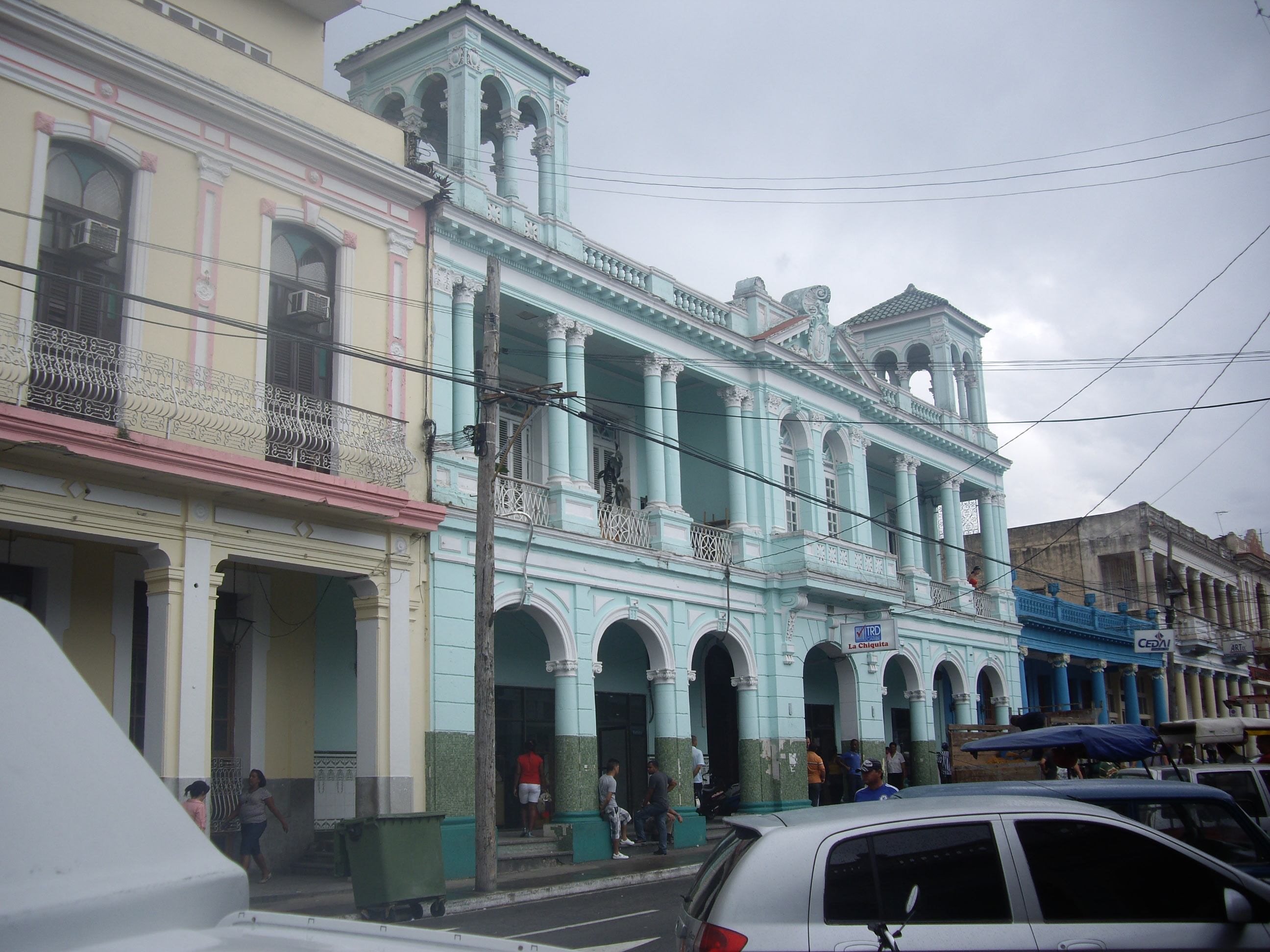
10. Pinar del Río

Nº	City	Population (2012 Census)	Population (2022 estimate)	Province
1	**Havana**	2,106,146	2,137,847	Havana
2	**Santiago de Cuba**	431,272	507,167	Santiago de Cuba
3	**Camagüey**	300,958	310,819	Camagüey
4	**Holguín**	287,881	302,890	Holguín
5	**Guantánamo**	217,135	213,375	Guantánamo
6	**Santa Clara**	211,925	217,907	Villa Clara
7	**Las Tunas**	162,957	176,139	Las Tunas
8	**Bayamo**	157,027	159,014	Granma
9	**Cienfuegos**	147,110	153,048	Cienfuegos
10	**Pinar del Río**	140,230	144,910	Pinar del Río
11	**Matanzas**	133,769	145,034	Matanzas
12	**Ciego de Ávila**	114,829	121,788	Ciego de Ávila
13	**Sancti Spíritus**	104,968	109,110	Sancti Spíritus
14	Manzanillo	98,904	...	Granma
15	Cárdenas	88,987	...	Matanzas
16	Palma Soriano	74,930	...	Santiago de Cuba
17	Moa	60,310	...	Holguín
18	Morón	59,371	...	Ciego de Ávila
19	Florida	54,191	...	Camagüey
20	Contramaestre	47,132	...	Santiago de Cuba
21	**Artemisa**	46,574	48,362	Artemisa
22	**Nueva Gerona**	46,264	45,926	Isla de la Juventud
23	Trinidad	45,041	...	Sancti Spíritus
24	Colón	44,177	...	Matanzas
25	Baracoa	43,062	...	Guantánamo
26	Güines	40,855	...	Mayabeque
27	Placetas	39,615	...	Villa Clara
28	Nuevitas	38,207	...	Camagüey
29	Sagua la Grande	37,713	...	Villa Clara
30	**San José de las Lajas**	36,640	40,599	Mayabeque
31	Banes	35,316	...	Holguín
32	San Luis	34,997	...	Santiago de Cuba
33	Puerto Padre	34,086	...	Las Tunas
34	San Antonio de los Baños	33,811	...	Artemisa
35	Caibarién	33,683	...	Villa Clara
36	Cabaiguán	30,326	...	Sancti Spíritus
37	Mayarí	29,259	...	Holguín
38	San Cristóbal	29,119	...	Artemisa
39	Vertientes	28,890	...	Camagüey
40	Jagüey Grande	28,870	...	Matanzas
41	Consolación del Sur	28,465	...	Pinar del Río
42	Jovellanos	26,319	...	Matanzas
43	Amancio	26,141	...	Las Tunas
44	Güira de Melena	25,424	...	Artemisa
45	Cumanayagua	25,031	...	Cienfuegos
46	Jatibonico	24,514	...	Sancti Spíritus
47	Niquero	24,244	...	Granma
48	San Germán	24,084	...	Holguín
49	Sagua de Tánamo	23,979	...	Holguín
50	Bauta	23,557	...	Artemisa
51	La Maya	23,341	...	Santiago de Cuba
52	Guanajay	22,839	...	Artemisa
53	Colombia	22,828	...	Las Tunas
54	Jiguaní	22,333	...	Granma
55	Manicaragua	22,266	...	Villa Clara
56	Camajuaní	21,924	...	Villa Clara
57	Guisa	21,849	...	Granma
58	Jobabo	20,309	...	Las Tunas

== See also ==
- List of places in Cuba
- Municipalities of Cuba
- Provinces of Cuba
