= Palma Soriano =

- Municipality
- Municipality of Palma Soriano
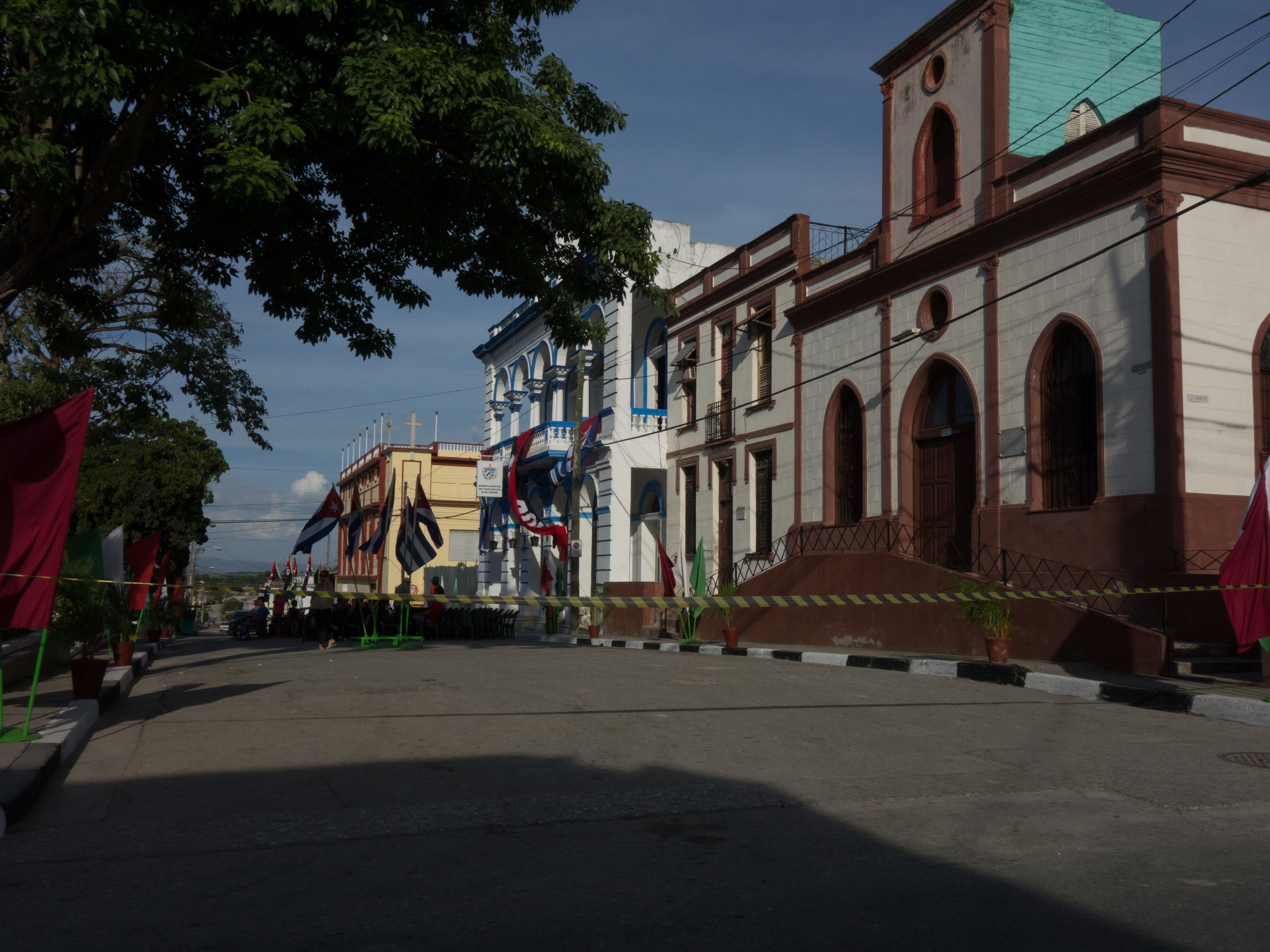

- Coat of arms

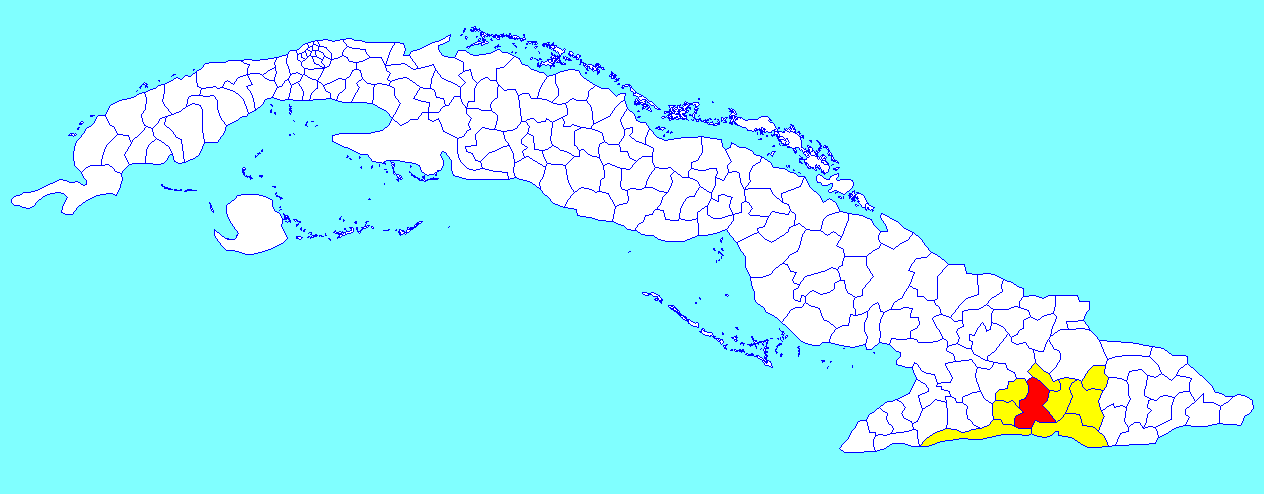
- Palma Soriano municipality location in Cuba.
- Coordinates: 20°12′50″N 75°59′31″W
- Country: Cuba
- Province: Santiago de Cuba
- Established: 1825

Area
  - Total: 845.8 km^{2} (326.6 sq mi)
- Elevation: 150 m (490 ft)

Population (2022)
  - Total: 119,740
  - Density: 141.6/km^{2} (366.7/sq mi)
- Demonym: Palmero/a
- Time zone: UTC-5 (EST)
- Postal code: 92610
- Area code: +53 22
- Website: https://www.palmasoriano.gob.cu/

Palma Soriano is a Cuban city and municipality in the Santiago de Cuba Province. With a population of 119,740 in the city proper, it is the second-largest in the province and the 16th-largest in Cuba.

== History ==
The city was founded in 1825, uniting ranches (haciendas) that stood in this area, and was the place where the body of José Martí (the leader of the Cuban independence movement, killed in 1895, in the Battle of Dos Ríos) was brought before it was laid in its final resting place in Santiago de Cuba.

== Geography ==
The city of Palma Soriano is located on the banks of the upper Cauto River. The municipality is divided into the localities of Aguacate, Arroyo Blanco, Candonga, Dos Palmas, Dos Ríos, El Maniel, Hatillo, Hicotea, La Candelaria, La Curia, Oriente, Ramón de Guaninao, Soledad, Yarayabo and other minor localities.

Until the 1976 national municipal reform, it included the localities of Alto Cedro, Caney del Sitio, Guaninao, José Martí, Juan Barón, La Concepción, Las Cuchillas, Los Dorados, Norte, Palmarito de Cauto, San Leandro, San Ramón, Santa Filomena and Sur.

== Demographics ==
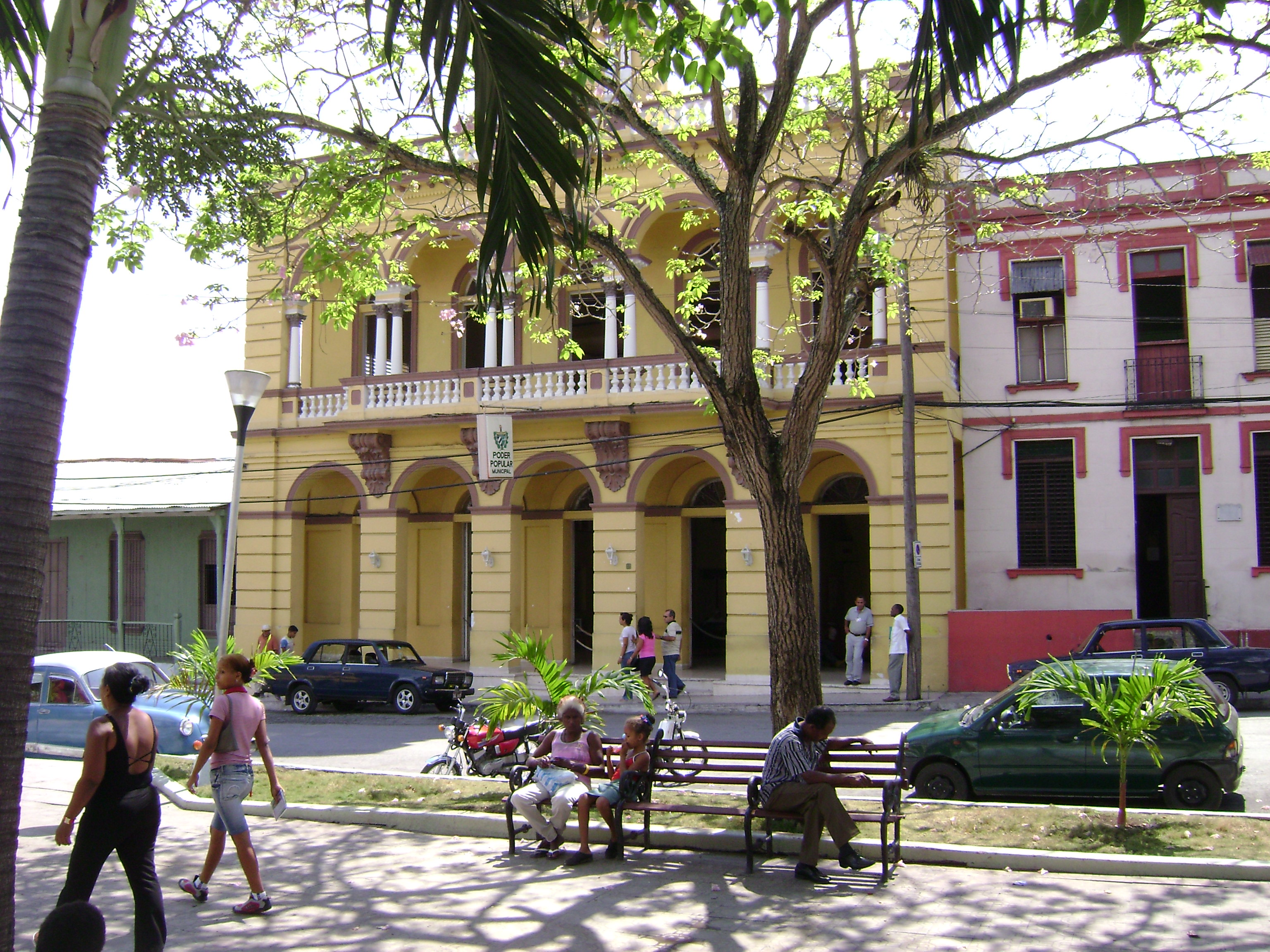
City hall

In 2022, the municipality of Palma Soriano had a population of 119,740. With a total area of 846 km^{2} (327 sq mi), it has a population density of 140/km^{2} (360/sq mi).

== Transport ==
The city is crossed in the middle by the state highway "Carretera Central" (CC), the longest highway in Cuba. It is served by two exits (one in the nearby hamlet of Dos Ríos) of the A1 motorway, on the Palma-Santiago de Cuba section.

Palma Soriano railway station is part of the San Luis-Bayamo line, and is served by trains to/from Santiago de Cuba, Guantánamo and Manzanillo.

== Personalities ==
- Orestes Kindelán (b. 1964), baseball player
- Jorge Molina Enríquez (b. 1966), actor and film director
- Ana Fidelia Quirot (b. 1963), field and track athlete
- Mey Vidal (b. 1984), Latin Reggae singer

== Twin Town ==
- (United States) Berkeley (California, USA)

== See also ==
- Municipalities of Cuba
- List of cities in Cuba
