= San Luis, Santiago de Cuba =

San Luis
- Municipality
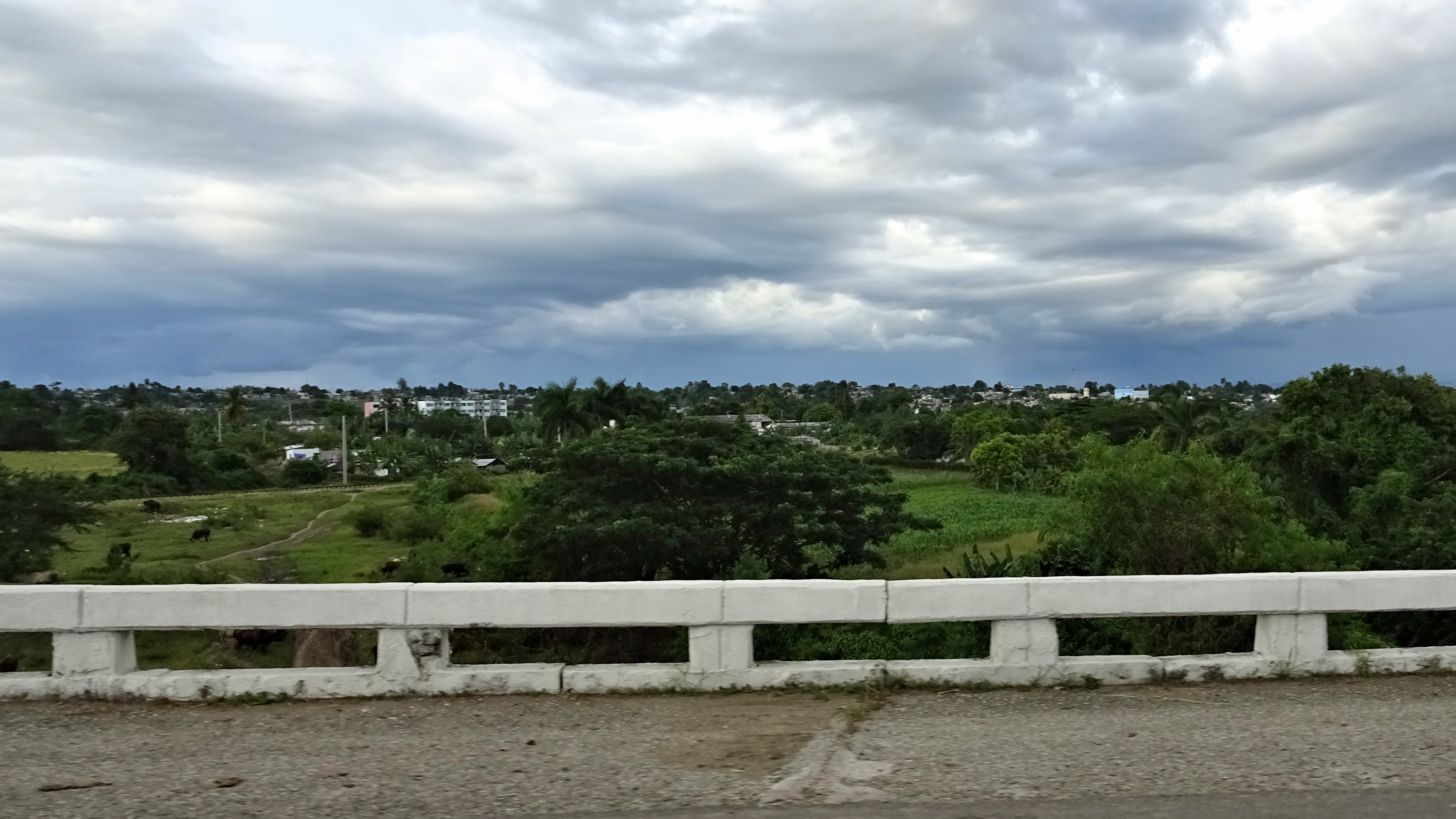

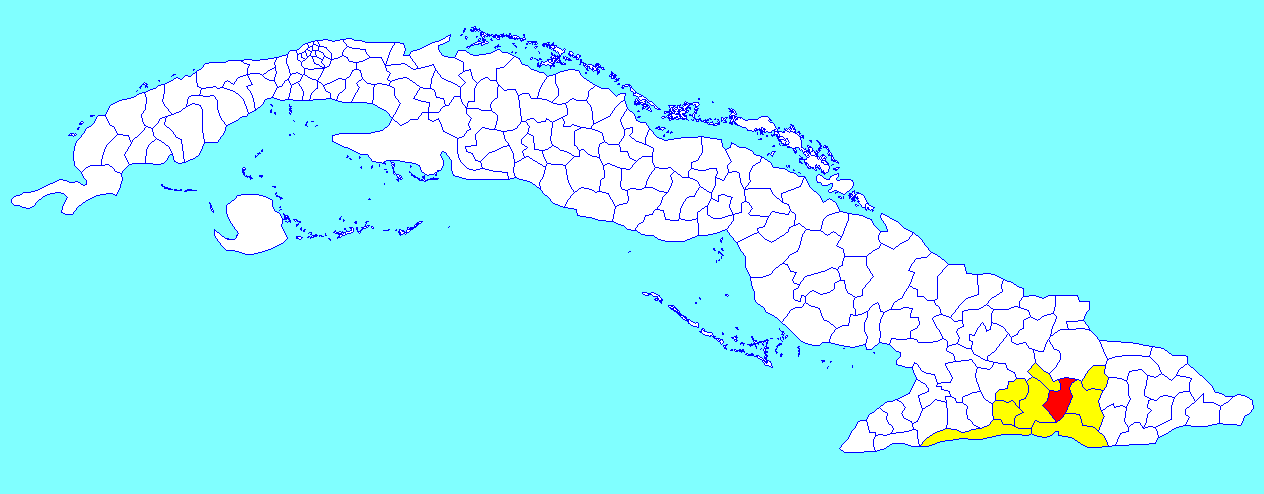
- San Luis municipality (red) within Santiago Province (yellow) and Cuba
- Coordinates: 20°11′17″N 75°50′55″W
- Country: Cuba
- Province: Santiago de Cuba
- Established: 1827

Area
  - Total: 498 km^{2} (192 sq mi)
- Elevation: 200 m (660 ft)

Population (2022)
  - Total: 77,519
  - Density: 156/km^{2} (403/sq mi)
- Time zone: UTC-5 (EST)
- Area code: +53-2248
- Website: https://www.sanluis.gob.cu/es/

San Luis is a town and municipality in the Santiago de Cuba Province of Cuba. It is located 19 km (12 mi) north of Santiago de Cuba.

== History ==
The city was founded in 1827 on the location of a ranch. Arrival of the railroad accelerated its development. San Luis achieved municipality status on 19 August 1898.

== Demographics ==
In 2022, the municipality of San Luis had a population of 77,519. With a total area of 498 km^{2} (192 sq mi), it has a population density of 160/km^{2} (410/sq mi).

The municipality is divided into the barrios of Dos Caminos, La Luz, Majaguabo, Monte Dos Leguas, Norte and Sur.

== Economy ==
- It is a railroad junction
- Agriculture: processing and trading of sugarcane, coffee, fruit, coffee roasting
- Stock raising
- Mining: manganese deposits
- Industry: sugar mills Rafael Reyes (NNE) and Paquito Rosales (NE) are located nearby

== Notable people ==
- María Cabrales - independence activist, revolutionary and nurse
- Félix B. Caignet - Writer - El derecho de nacer
- Cándido Fabré - Songwriter and Singer
- Ibrahim Ferrer - Son Singer
- Antonio Maceo - Liberation Army General (The Bronze Titan)
- Barbara Moya Montoya -Derecho de Autor- Compositora - Canciones
- Augusto Rivero Más - Architect
- Pedro Meurice Estíu - Archbishop, Santiago de Cuba
- Luis Garzón Masabó - Artist
- Justo Salas Arzuaga - First Afro-Cuban Mayor of City of Santiago de Cuba 1940-1945/First Afro-Cuban Governor of Oriente, Cuba 1956)
- Europa Casadevall Sola (la mujer mas bella del mundo) hija de Pedro Casadevall y Maria Sola

== See also ==
- List of cities in Cuba
- Municipalities of Cuba
