= Santiago de Cuba Province =

Province of Cuba

- Province
- Province of Santiago de Cuba
- Coat of arms

- Coordinates: 20°12′N 75°55′W
- Country: Cuba
- Region: Oriente
- Capital: Santiago de Cuba

Government
  - President: Beatriz Johnson Urrutia
  - Vice-President: Manuel Falcón Hernández

Area
  - Total: 6,277 km^{2} (2,424 sq mi)

Population (2022)
  - Total: 1,037,339
  - Rank: 2nd in Cuba
  - Density: 165.3/km^{2} (428.0/sq mi)
- Time zone: UTC-5 (EST)
- Area code: +53-226
- HDI (2019): 0.784 high · 7th of 16
- Website: https://www.santiago.gob.cu/es/

Santiago de Cuba Province is the second most populated province in the island of Cuba. The largest city Santiago de Cuba is the main administrative center. Other large cities include Palma Soriano, Contramaestre, San Luis, and Songo-La Maya.

== History ==
Santiago de Cuba province has been the site of many battles, both during the war for independence and the 1959 Cuban Revolution, where much of the guerrilla fighting took place in the forested and mountainous province.

Prior to 1976, Cuba was divided into six historical provinces. One of these was Oriente province, which was, prior to 1905, known as Santiago de Cuba province. The present day province comprises the south-central region of Oriente.

== Economy ==
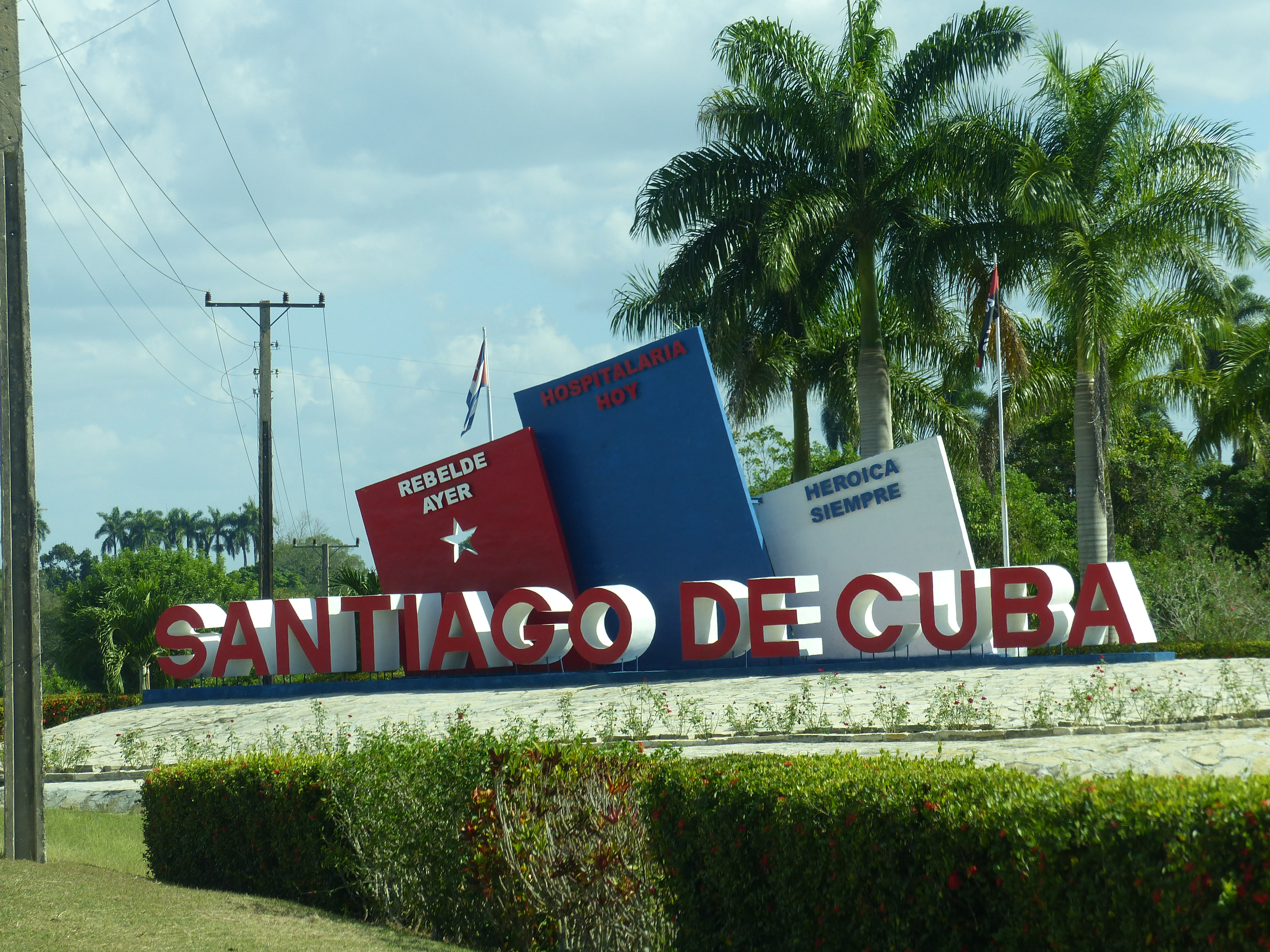
Welcome sign in the province

The province is rich in material resources such as iron and nickel. The economy, however, relies mostly on agriculture, with large plantations growing bananas, cacao, and coffee dotting the landscape. Industry is growing around the capital, as is tourism. The natural environment of the province attracts tourists from elsewhere in Cuba and from overseas.

== Municipalities ==
Municipality	Population (2004)	Population (2022)	Area (km^{2})	Location	Remarks
Contramaestre	105,493	104,334	610.3	20.30000°N 76.25056°W	
Guamá	35,516	34,296	965	19.97611°N 76.40972°W	Chivirico
Mella	33,667	34,031	335.2	20.36944°N 75.91083°W	
Palma Soriano	124,585	119,740	845.8	20.21417°N 75.99167°W	
San Luis	88,496	77,519	765	20.18806°N 75.84861°W	
Santiago de Cuba	472,255	507,167	1,023.8	20.04028°N 75.81472°W	Provincial capital
Segundo Frente	40,885	40,196	540	20.41194°N 75.52861°W	Mayarí Arriba
Songo-La Maya	100,287	89,819	721	20.17333°N 75.64611°W	La Maya
Tercer Frente	30,457	30,237	364	20.17194°N 76.32722°W	Cruce de los Baños

Source: Population from 2004 Census. Area from 1976 municipal re-distribution.
Source: Onei 2023.

== Demographics ==
In 2004, the province of Santiago De Cuba had a population of 1,043,202. With a total area of 6,156.44 km^{2} (2,377.01 sq mi), the province had a population density of 169.4/km^{2} (439/sq mi).

== International Relation ==
=== Twin Town — Sister City ===
Santiago de Cuba Province is twinned with:

- Naples, Italy

== See also ==
- Oriente Province
