= Jiguaní =

- Municipality
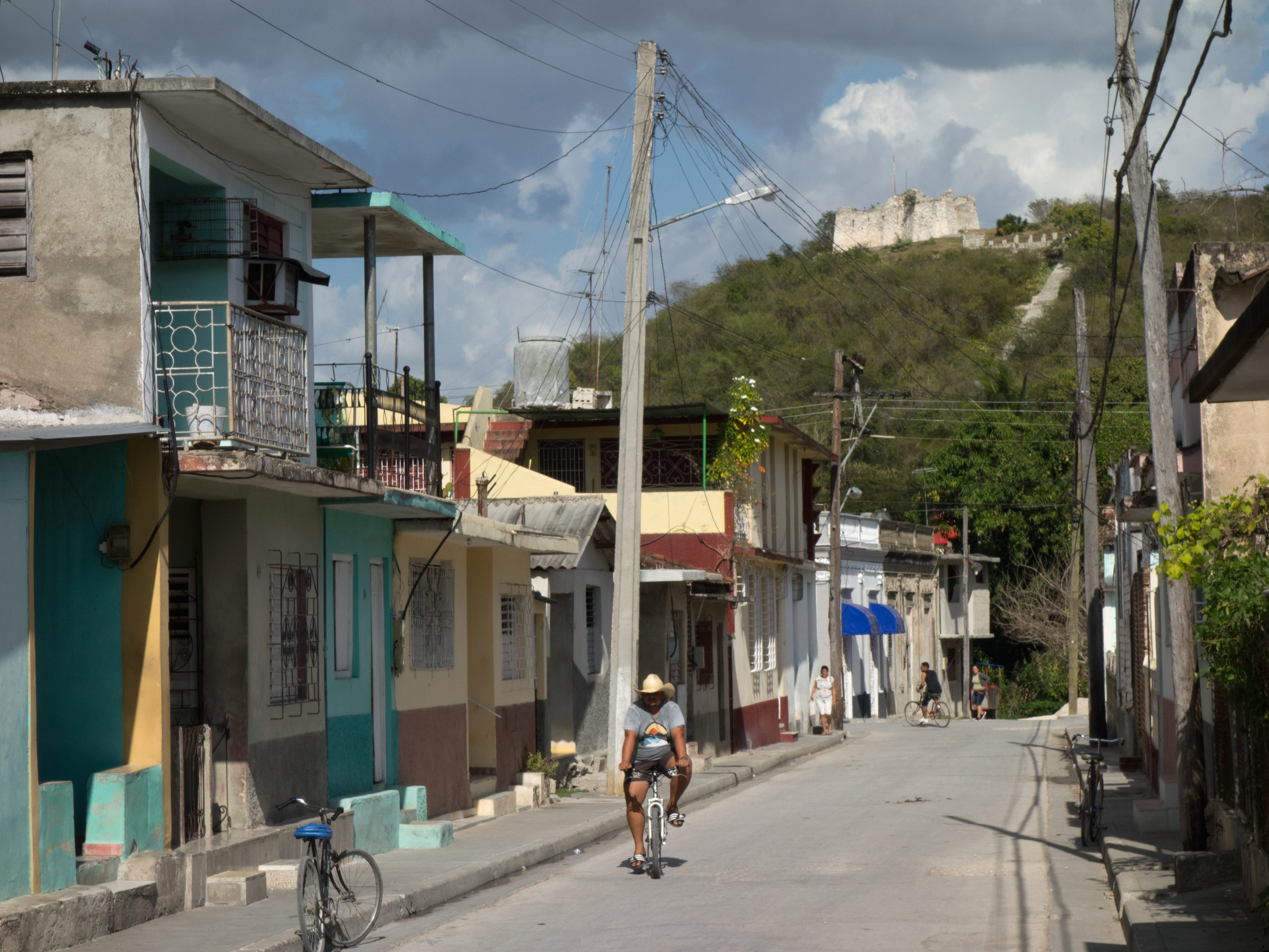

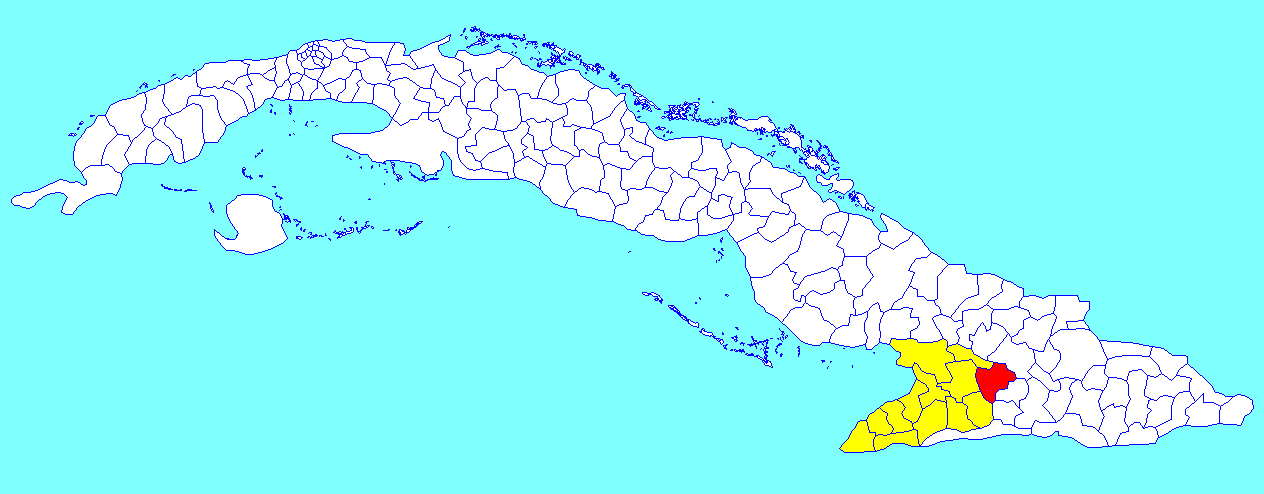
- Jiguaní municipality (red) within Granma Province (yellow) and Cuba
- Coordinates: 20°22′23″N 76°25′20″W
- Country: Cuba
- Province: Granma
- Established: 1701

Area
  - Total: 646 km^{2} (249 sq mi)
- Elevation: 125 m (410 ft)

Population (2022)
  - Total: 58,982
  - Density: 91.3/km^{2} (236/sq mi)
- Time zone: UTC-5 (EST)
- Area code: +53-23
- Website: https://www.jiguani.gob.cu/es/

Jiguaní (Spanish pronunciation: [xiɣwaˈni]) is a town and municipality in the Granma Province of Cuba. It is located 25 kilometres (16 mi) east of Bayamo, the provincial capital.

== Overview ==
The municipality is divided into the barrios of Babiney, Baire, Bijagual, La Villa, Los Negros, Maffo, Rihito and Santa Rita.

The name "Jiguaní" is of Taíno origin, and means "height of the river". The town of Jiguaní was a stronghold and a starting point in the independence war of 1895.

== Demographics ==
In 2022, the municipality of Jiguaní had a population of 58,982. With a total area of 646 km^{2} (249 sq mi), it has a population density of 91/km^{2} (240/sq mi).

== See also ==
- Municipalities of Cuba
- List of cities in Cuba
