= Alejandro de Humboldt National Park =

National park in Cuba

- IUCN category II (national park)
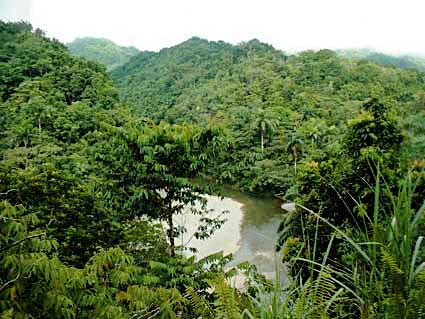
- Alejandro de Humboldt National Park

- Location within Cuba
- Location: Cuba
- Nearest city: Guantánamo
- Coordinates: 20°27′N 75°00′W
- Area: 711.38 km^{2} (274.67 sq mi)

UNESCO World Heritage Site
- Type: Natural
- Criteria: ix, x
- Designated: 2001 (25th session)
- Reference no.: 839rev
- Region: Latin America and the Caribbean

Alejandro de Humboldt National Park (Spanish: Parque Nacional Alejandro de Humboldt) is a national park in the Cuban provinces of Holguín and Guantánamo. It is named after the German scientist Alexander von Humboldt who visited the island in 1800 and 1801. The park was inscribed as a UNESCO World Heritage Site in 2001 for its size, altitude range, complex lithology, landform diversity, and wealth of endemic flora and fauna.

== Geography ==
The rivers that flow off the peaks of the park are some of the largest in the insular Caribbean. The park is said to be the most humid place in Cuba and this causes a high biological diversity. The park has an area of 711.38 km^{2} (274.67 sq mi), of which 685.72 km^{2} (264.76 sq mi) land area and 22.63 km^{2} (8.74 sq mi) marine area. Elevation ranges from sea level to 1,168 m (3,832 ft) on El Toldo Peak.

The region around Alejandro de Humboldt National Park is geologically complex, containing karst landscapes that originated from oceanic crust in the Cretaceous period. Unique to this region, the landscape is ultrabasic, dominated by serpentine soils and peridotites.

== Wildlife ==
The area comprising the national park was a Pleistocene refugium, retaining a relatively stable climate through the repeated glaciation events. This has allowed for remarkably high rates of endemism and biodiversity in the park. In addition, the ultra-basic rocks are relatively toxic to plants, driving rapid speciation. 16 of Cuba's 28 endemic plant species are protected in the park including such flora as Dracaena cubensis and Podocarpus ekmanii. Fauna present in the park includes various species of parrots, lizards, hummingbirds, the endangered Cuban solenodon (endemic), hutia and snails.

Over 900 total plant species have been recorded at the park, along with 45 species of reptiles, 21 amphibian species, and 10 mammal species.

=== Important Bird Area ===
The park has been recognised as an Important Bird Area (IBA) by BirdLife International because it supports populations of northern bobwhites, white crowned and plain pigeons, grey-fronted and blue-headed quail-doves, Antillean nighthawks, Cuban nightjars, Antillean palm-swifts, Cuban emeralds, bee hummingbirds, great lizard cuckoos, Cuban pygmy owls, bare-legged owls, Cuban kites, Gundlach's hawks, Cuban trogons and todies, Cuban green and West Indian woodpeckers, Cuban amazons and parakeets, loggerhead and giant kingbirds, La Sagra's flycatchers, Cuban pewees, vireos, crows, gnatcatchers and solitaires, Oriente warblers, Cuban orioles, tawny-shouldered and Cuban blackbirds, Greater Antillean grackles, western spindalises, and Cuban bullfinches and grassquits.

== History ==
The Alexander von Humboldt National Park has historically been an area of land little used by man, with only one archaeological site from the pre-Columbian period being known; this is located in the coastal zone of Aguas Verdes. During the eighteenth and nineteenth centuries some peripheral places were used as refuges or camps by maroons.

The park began to be laid out in the 1960s, with the declaration of the Jaguani and Cupeyal del Norte nature reserves. This continued into the 1980s with the proposal of the Ojito del Agua Refuge, associated with the last sighting of the Cuban ivory-billed woodpecker, a last remnant of this species which was already extinct in its other habitats in the United States and Mexico. In 1996 these protected areas were united to form a national park that was named after Alexander von Humboldt. Being one of the most important biosphere reserves in the Caribbean basin, the national park, along with Cuchillas del Toa was declared a UNESCO World Natural Heritage Site in 2001.

There are unique flora and fauna elements in this unique ecosystem, with some of the highest indexes of endemicity in the archipelago.

== See also ==
- Nipe-Sagua-Baracoa
- Sierra Cristal National Park
