= Podocarpus ekmanii =

Conservation status
- Least Concern (IUCN 3.1)

Scientific classification
- Kingdom: Plantae
- Clade: Tracheophytes
- Clade: Gymnosperms
- Division: Pinophyta
- Class: Pinopsida
- Order: Araucariales
- Family: Podocarpaceae
- Genus: Podocarpus
- Species: P. ekmanii

Binomial name
- Podocarpus ekmanii Urb.

Species of conifer

Podocarpus ekmannii is a species of conifer in the family Podocarpaceae. It is a shrub or tree endemic to eastern Cuba. It is locally known as sabina cimarrona.

It generally a shrub growing 3 to 6 metres (9.8 to 19.7 ft) tall, and occasionally a small tree growing to 20 metres (66 ft) tall.

It grows in the Sierra de Cristal, Sierra de Moa, and Sierra de Nipe ranges of eastern Cuba, from 200 to 1,300 metres (660 to 4,270 ft) elevation in areas with average annual rainfall of 1,800 to 3,200 mm (71 to 126 in). It grows in wet sclerophyllous rainforests, known as charrascales, and is associated with the canopy trees Bonnetia cubensis, Cyrilla nipensis, Calyptronoma plumeriana, Hedyosmum subintegrum, Magnolia cubensis, Ocotea bucheri, Miconia lindmanii, and Pinus cubensis.

The species is locally common and not considered threatened. Two national parks, Sierra Cristal and Alejandro de Humboldt, cover portions of its range.
