= The Stone Zoo =

Coordinates: 20.274632°N 75.069017°W

- Zoologico de Piedra
- Location within Cuba
- Location: Yateras, Cuba
- Created: 1977
- Founder: Ángel Íñigo Blanco (1935-2014)
- Designation: Cultural Patrimony of Cuba
- Website: Zoologicodepiedra.com

The Stone Zoo (Zoologico de Piedra in Spanish) is a collection of more than 400 animal and people sculptures in rock in Alto de Boquerón, Yateras, Cuba. It is the only one of its kind in the world. It opened to the public on 21 December 1977.

== History ==
In 1977, the self-taught sculptor Ángel Íñigo Blanco quit his coffee-picking job and started to chisel rocks in the natural park, which is located 24km from the city of Guantánamo. Blanco had begun to create models from the age of 5, but had not done so professionally, having worked as a farmer and in a museum until moving to Guantánamo. He created a large number of sculptures displaying animals from across the globe throughout the park, also sculpting the areas around them to display them in areas resembling their natural habitats. The largest work in the park is a large stone house, with furniture and a family inside. The house was sculpted from a limestone cliff 3 meters tall.

Blanco retired from sculpting his stone zoo in 2002, by which time there were over 400 sculptures in the park. Blanco's son is also a sculptor, but chose not to continue his father's project after his retirement. Blanco died in 2014.

The Stone Zoo was declared part of the Cultural Patrimony of Cuba on June 26, 1985. Additionally, it is part of the Cuchillas del Toa biosphere reserve. Blanco also won a number of prizes during his lifetime for his work on the zoo, including from the Workers' Central Union of Cuba and the National Union of Writers and Artists of Cuba.
