= Yateras =

- Municipality
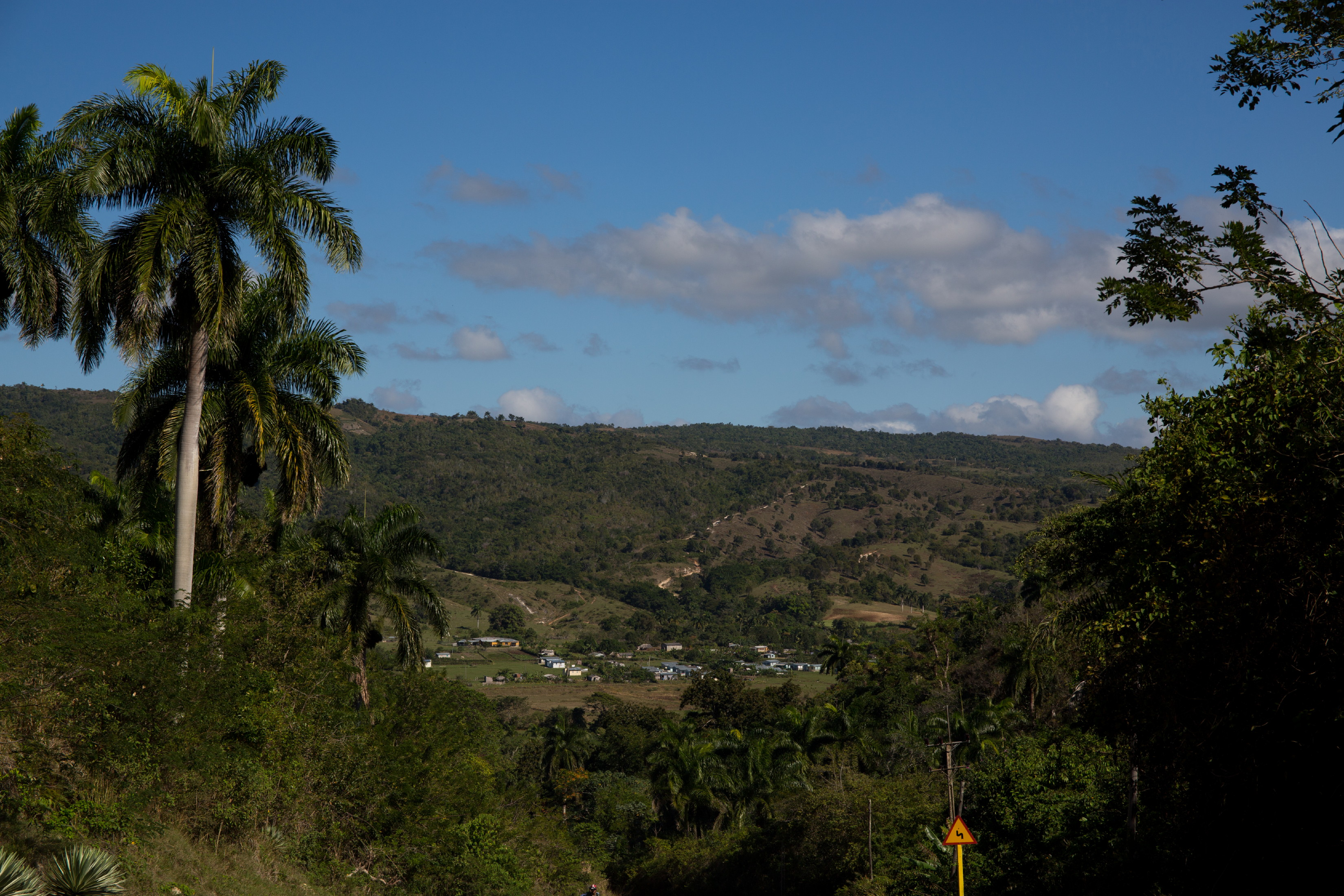

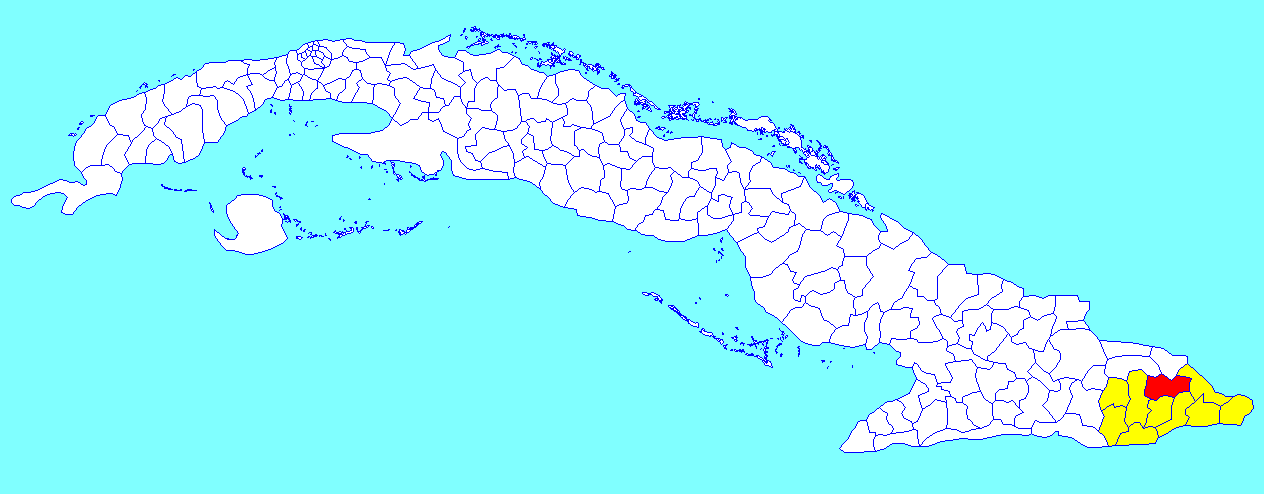
- Yateras municipality (red) within Guantánamo Province (yellow) and Cuba
- Coordinates: 20°21′0″N 74°55′28″W
- Country: Cuba
- Province: Guantánamo
- Seat: Palenque

Area
  - Municipality: 664 km^{2} (256 sq mi)
- Elevation: 370 m (1,210 ft)

Population (2022)
  - Municipality: 18,642
  - Density: 28.1/km^{2} (72.7/sq mi)
  - Urban: 3,076
  - Rural: 15,566
- Time zone: UTC-5 (EST)
- Area code: +53-21
- Website: https://www.yateras.gob.cu/es/

Yateras is a municipality in the Guantánamo Province of Cuba. The municipal seat is located in the town of Palenque, in the northern part of the province. Alejandro de Humboldt National Park, a UNESCO World Heritage Site is partly located in this municipality. It is considered the highest settlement in Cuba.

== Geography ==
The municipality is divided into the barrios of Casimbas, Casisey Abajo, Casisey Arriba, Guayabal, Palmar, Río Seco, San Andrés, Sigual and Yateras. Jamaica, now seat of Manuel Tames municipality, was part of Yateras until the reform of 1976.

== Demographics ==
In 2022, the municipality of Yateras had a population of 18,642. With a total area of 664 km^{2} (256 sq mi), it has a population density of 28/km^{2} (73/sq mi).

== International relations ==
=== Twin towns – Sister cities ===
Yateras is twinned with:

- Boulder, Colorado, United States, since 1987

== See also ==
- List of cities in Cuba
- Municipalities of Cuba
- List of highest towns by country
- The Stone Zoo
