= La Mensura-Pilotos National Park =

National park in Cuba

La Mensura–Pilotos National Park
- Parque Nacional La Mensura-Pilotos
- IUCN category II (national park)
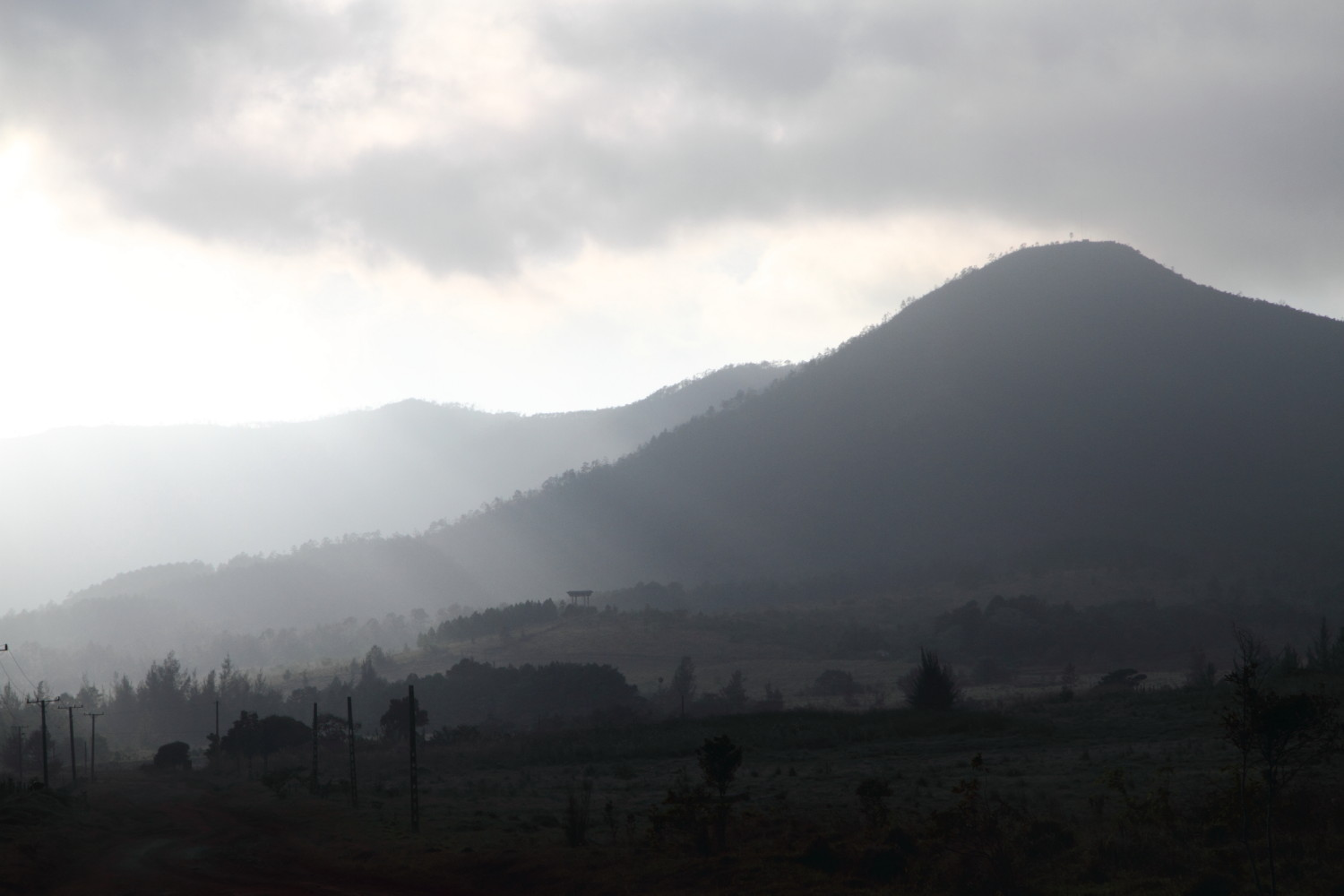
- Loma La Mensura
- Interactive map of La Mensura–Pilotos National Park
- Location: Holguín Province, Cuba
- Coordinates: 20.48°N 75.83°W
- Area: 84.86 km^{2} (32.76 sq mi)
- Designation: National Park
- Designated: 2008
- Administrator: Ministerio de Ciencia, Tecnología y Medio Ambiente

La Mensura-Pilotos National Park is a protected area in eastern Cuba. It covers the southern and western flanks of the Sierra de Nipe in Holguin Province. It was designated a national park in 2008, and has an area of 84.86 km^{2}.

== Geography ==
The Sierra de Nipe is the westernmost range in the Nipe-Sagua-Baracoa massif, which extends to Cuba's eastern tip. Loma La Mensura, at 995 meters elevation, is the highest point in the park and in the Sierra de Nipe.

== Ecology ==
The Nipe-Sagua-Baracoa massif is the most biodiverse region in Cuba. Plant communities in the park include lowland and montane moist forest, pine forest, and scrubland. More 900 species of plants have been recorded in the Sierra de Nipe, including many Cuban and local endemic species.

112 bird species have been recorded in the area, about 31% of those present in the Cuban archipelago. This includes 16 species endemic to Cuba, over half of the species endemic to the country. Eight threatened bird species are present in the park, including Cuban endemics grey-fronted quail-dove or camao (Geotrygon caniceps) and bee hummingbird or zunzuncito (Mellisuga helenae). Other Cuban endemics include the bare-legged owl or sijú cotunto (Margarobyas lawrencii), Stygian owl or siguapa (Asio stygius siguapa) and olive-capped warbler or bijirita del pinar (Setophaga pityophila).

67 species of terrestrial mollusks have been recorded in the Sierra de Nipe, 90% of which are endemic to Cuba and nine of which are locally endemic.
