= Toa river =

River in Cuba

Toa River
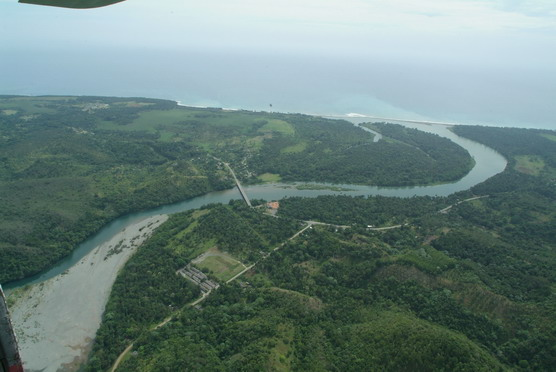

Location
- Country: Cuba
- Province: Guantánamo

Physical characteristics
- Mouth
  - coordinates: 20°23′42″N 74°31′55″W
- Length: 131 km (81 mi)
- Basin size: 1,061 km^{2} (410 sq mi)
- Discharge
  - location: Near mouth
  - average: 57 m^{3}/s (2,000 cu ft/s)

The Toa is a river located in the Guantánamo Province of Cuba, which flows across the country. This river is 131 kilometers long and has 72 tributaries. The Toa river is well known for its crystal clear waters.

== Overview ==
The watershed of the Toa river extends for 1,061 square kilometres (410 sq mi), and has a half slope of 260 metres (850 ft). It takes up about 70% of the Cuchillas del Toa Biosphere Reserve. The area around the river is home to many species of endemic flora and fauna, including at least 1000 species of flowers and 145 species of ferns. Species in danger of extinction, such as the Cuban trogon (which is also the national bird of Cuba) and the Cuban kite, are also among the fauna of this area.

== See also ==
- List of rivers of Cuba
- Nipe-Sagua-Baracoa
