= Grey-headed quail-dove =

Grey-headed quail-dove may refer to the following species split by the AOU in 2004:

- Grey-fronted quail-dove, Geotrygon caniceps (endemic to Cuba)
- White-fronted quail-dove, Geotrygon leucometopia (endemic to Hispaniola)
