= Nipe-Sagua-Baracoa =

Mountain range of Cuba

- Macizo de Nipe Sagua Baracoa
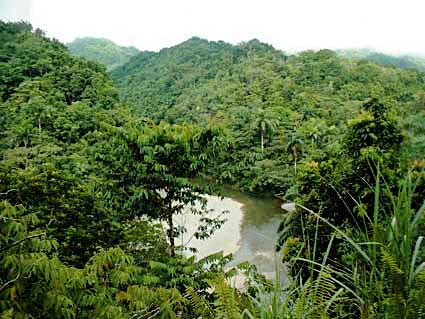
- Alejandro de Humboldt National Park, in the middle of the mountain range

Highest point
- Peak: Pico Cristal, Sierra Cristal
- Elevation: 1,231 m (4,039 ft)
- Coordinates: 20°32′56.04″N 75°30′16.56″W

Dimensions
- Length: 187 km (116 mi)
- Width: 50 km (31 mi)

Geography
- Location within Cuba
- Country: Cuba
- Provinces: Holguín and Guantánamo
- Range coordinates: 20°30′14″N 74°51′00″W

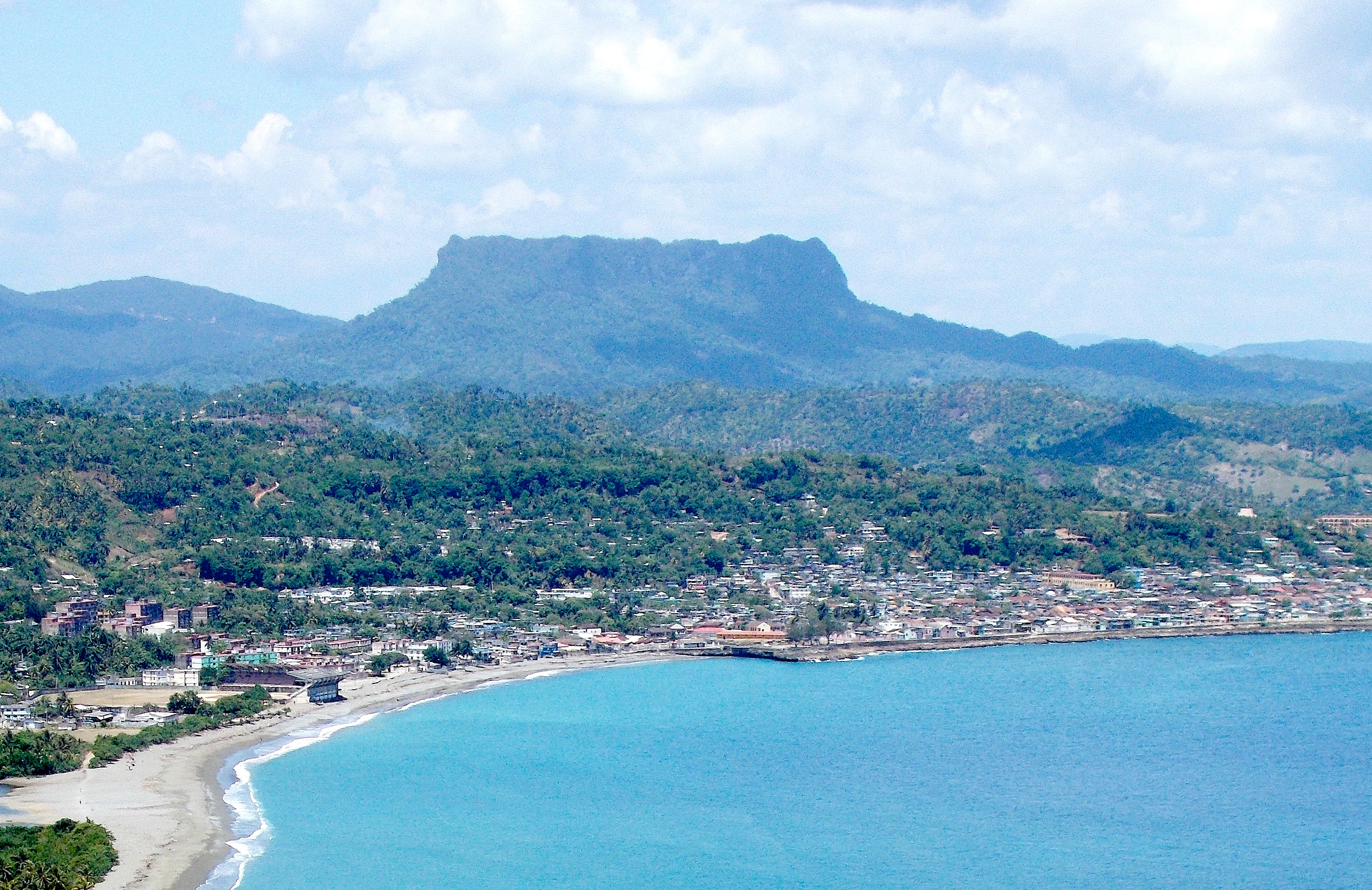
View of El Yunque mountain and Baracoa bay

Nipe-Sagua-Baracoa, also known as Macizo Nipe Sagua Baracoa ("Nipe Sagua Baracoa Massif"), is a mountain range of eastern Cuba.

== Geography ==
The range is located in Holguín and Guantánamo provinces, and a small portion in northeastern Santiago de Cuba Province.

The Nipe-Sagua-Baracoa massif extends for a length of 187 km and a width of 50 km, from the central-eastern part of the Holguín Province (near Nipe Bay, Mayarí) to Cuba's easternmost point at Maisí in Guantánamo Province. Lowlands and hills separate the massif from the Sierra Maestra to the southwest. The massif includes Pico Cristal (1,231 m), the second highest Cuban peak after Pico Turquino (1,974 m) in the Sierra Maestra.

The massif is crossed by the rivers Toa, Mayarí, and Sagua de Tánamo.

The massif is made up of several smaller ranges.

- The Sierra de Nipe is the westernmost range, a plateau of approximately 600 km^{2} from 500 to 700 meters elevation. The highest peak is Loma de la Mensura at 995 meters. It is bounded on the north by the Bay of Nipe, on the west and south by the Cauto River valley, and on the east by the Mayarí River. The core of the plateau is made of serpentine soil covering approximately 280 km^{2}, while the outer portions are predominantly limestone. Natural plant communities include sclerophyllous montane rainforest, serpentine pine forest, and montane evergreen scrub-woodland broadleaf on the serpentine plateau. These serpentine plant communities are rich in endemic species, including some shared with the neighboring Sierra de Cristal. Broadleaf evergreen and semideciduous forests grow on the limestone slopes. Human disturbance has altered large areas of the range, creating semi-natural pine forests and ruderal grassland and scrubland.
- The Sierra Cristal is east of the Sierra de Nipe, separated by the narrow valley of the Mayarí River. It covers an area of approximately 2000 km^{2}, mostly from 700 to 1000 meters elevation. It is bounded on the east by the valley of the Sagua de Tánamo River. Pico Cristal (1,231 m) is the highest point in the Sierra Cristal and the entire Nipe-Sagua-Baracoa massif. The range is composed of reddish serpentine soils above approximately 700 meters elevation, and limestone-derived clay soils at lower elevations. Broadleaf evergreen forests are extend up to 600 meters elevation, and include scattered patches of secondary forest. Pine forests on serpentine soils predominate between 600 and 1100 meters elevation. Montane scrub-woodland grows above 1100 meters on the serpentine bedrock of Pico Cristal.
- The Sierra de Moa-Toa covers an area of approximately 3000 km^{2}, bounded on the Sagua de Tánamo valley, on the north by the Gulf of Mexico, on the south by the karstic Nipe-Yateras mountains, and on the west by the Baracoa mountains. It is the most topographically complex portion of the massif, composed of several sharp mountains, plateaus, and ridges from 500 to 900 meters elevation. Pico del Toldo (1,175 m) in the Sierra de Moa or Cuchillas de Moa is the highest peak. Other peaks include Pico Galán (974 m) in the Cuchillas del Toa. Plant communities are varied, and include semideciduous and evergreen broadleaf forest below 250 meters elevation, serpentine sclerophyllous montane rainforest up to 1000 m, and semi-dry montane serpentine scrub-woodlands on the highest peaks. Serpentine pine forests grow on the Cupeyal Plateau, in the Toa Valley, and above 1000 m on the northern hills.
- The Baracoa mountains are the eastern portion of the massif, extending nearly to the easternmost tip of Cuba at Punta de Maisí. They are bounded on the north by the Gulf of Mexico and on the south by the Caribbean Sea. The Baracoa mountains are composed of a central zone of serpentine mountains surrounded by a larger region of limestone mountains, karstic mogotes (irregularly-shaped isolated hills), and plateaus of 100 to 400 meters elevation. The Cuchillas de Baracoa, near the homonym city, reach a maximum elevation of 788 m. Closer to the Caribbean coast are the limestone Sierra del Purial, with a maximum elevation of 1,059 m, and the Sierra de Imías, near the homonym town, with Pico el Gato (1,176 m) its highest peak. Broadleaf evergreen forest is predominant in the hills, with pockets of humid montane forest on the peaks. Broadleaf semideciduous forest is common at lower elevations.

== Environment ==
Nipe-Sagua-Baracoa is known for its biodiversity and counts the national parks of Sierra Cristal, Alejandro de Humboldt, and La Mensura-Pilotos, and the biosphere reserve of Cuchillas del Toa. It is the only place in the world where the rare Cuban solenodon is found.

== See also ==
- El Yunque
- Sagua de Tánamo
- Geography of Cuba
