= Cuchillas del Toa =

Biosphere reserve in Cuba

- IUCN category IV (habitat/species management area)
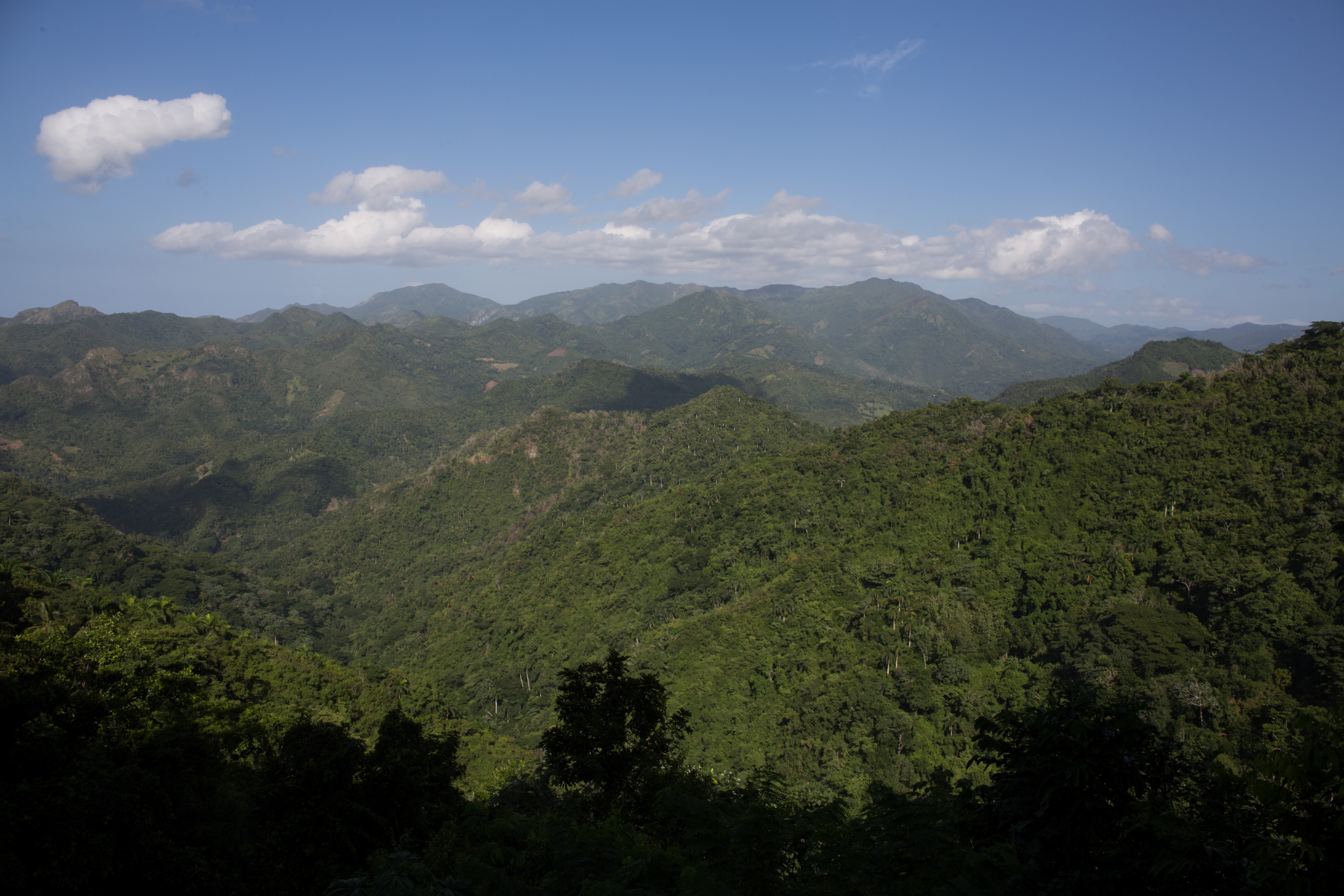
- View from La Farola to the Cuchillas de Toa

- Location within Cuba
- Location: Cuba
- Nearest city: Baracoa
- Coordinates: 20°23′11″N 74°41′40″W
- Area: 2,023.54 km^{2} (781.29 sq mi)
- Established: 1987
- Governing body: El Ministerio de Ciencia, Tecnología y Medio Ambiente (CITMA)

Cuchillas del Toa (English: Ridges of Toa) is a Biosphere Reserve in Cuba. It is located in the eastern part of the country, mostly in the Guantánamo Province and reaching to the north into the Holguín Province. Most of the reserve is established in the drainage area of the Toa River, which flows for 118 km (73 mi) to the Atlantic Ocean in Baracoa.

== Overview ==
The reserve extends along 2,083.05 square kilometres (804.27 sq mi), of which 60.13 square kilometres (23.22 sq mi) to the marine area. Cuchillas del Toa is considered as one of the principal centers of biodiversity and endemism in Cuba and the insular Caribbean with pine forests, cloud forests and xeric scrub to complex coastal vegetation with mangroves and coral reefs. The karstic system of the great cave of Moa Head lands is one of the five natural monuments in the country and one of the great cave systems in eastern Cuba. With high biodiversity in flora and fauna, there are 928 endemic species reported, including primitive species belonging to the genera Podocarpus and Dracaena. Cuchillas del Toa is home to the highly endangered Cuban ivory-billed woodpecker (Campephilus principalis bairdii), Cuban kite (Chondrohierax wilsoni), and the Cuban solenodon (Solenodon cubanus). Some of the world's smallest mammal species are found in the reserve. About 18,300 inhabitants (2002), in 498 communities, live in the buffer zone and transition area of this mountainous reserve. Engaged in forestry, traditional agriculture (coffee, coconut, and cacao) and ecotourism, they also raise cattle and participate in nickel, chromium, iron and cobalt mining. These activities had increased negative impacts in the carrying capacity of the ecosystems, one of the main problems the reserve faces today. Another interesting aspect of this biosphere reserve is its history as battlefield for freedom. In the 18th and 19th centuries, escaped African slaves called Cimmarones found refuge in the region. It is twinned with the Montes Azules Biosphere Reserve in Chiapas, Mexico, due to similar environmental conditions and resource management.

The reserve protects tropical wet forest and coastal/marine ecosystems. It surrounds the Alejandro de Humboldt National Park and also contains El Yunque table mountain, the Infierno Creek with a 300-metre (980 ft) waterfall, the Great Cave of Moa (Gran Caverna de Moa) and the Bay of Taco, north of Baracoa.

== Conservation ==
The reserve was classified as IUCN Managed Resource Protected Area. It has a total area of 2,023.54 km^{2} (781.29 sq mi), and its core area, the Alejandro de Humboldt National Park, is sub-divided into 4 areas, called Cupeyal del Norte, Ojito de Agua, la Melba and Baracoa. Cuchillas del Toa was listed as a UNESCO Biosphere Reserve in 1987.

The reserve protects species such as the Cuban solenodon (Solenodon cubanus, almiquí), Cuban trogon (Priotelus temnurus, Cuba's national bird), Gundlach's hawk (Accipiter gundlachi) and Cuban green woodpecker (Xiphidiopicus percussus), some endangered.

=== Protected areas ===
The different areas of the reserve have various uses, and are further divided into other protected areas, such as the proposed Ecological Reserve Quivijan-Duaba-Yunque de Baracoa and the Flora Managed Reserve of Pico Galan (Galan Peak)

== See also ==
- Toa River
- Nipe-Sagua-Baracoa
