= Sierra Cristal National Park =

National park and mountain in Cuba

- IUCN category II (national park)
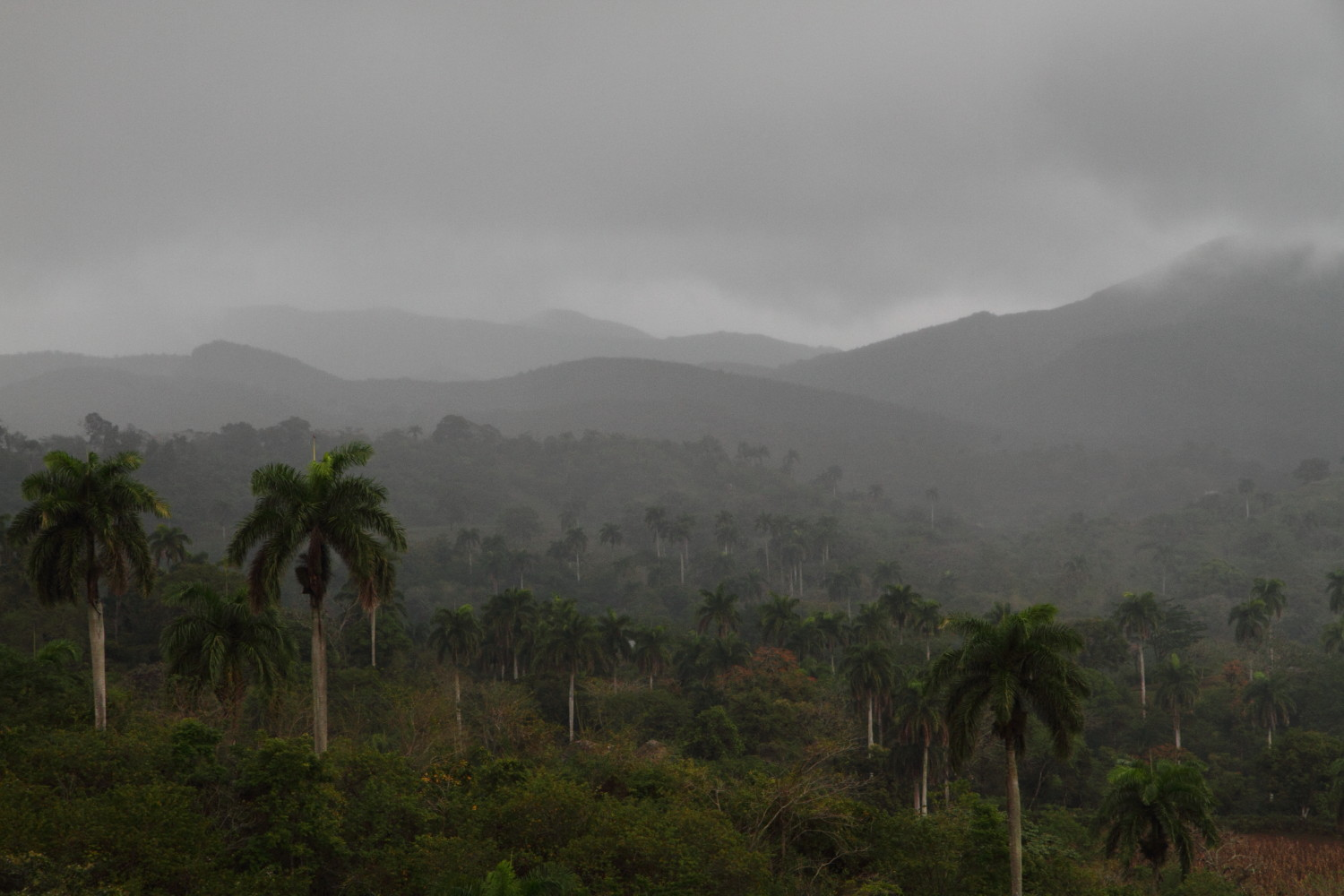
- Sierra de Cristal

- Location within Cuba
- Location: Holguín Province, Cuba
- Nearest city: Mayarí
- Coordinates: 20°32′31″N 75°28′34″W
- Area: 185.37 square kilometres (71.57 sq mi)
- Established: 24 April 1930

Sierra Cristal National Park (Spanish: Parque Nacional Sierra Cristal) is a national park, the first national park created in Cuba, established by presidential decree on 24 April 1930. It occupies mountainous terrain in Holguín Province in eastern Cuba.

== Geography ==
It is located in the municipalities of Mayarí and Sagua de Tánamo in southern Holguín Province It consists of mountainous terrain in the Sierra Cristal, a part of the Nipe-Sagua-Baracoa mountain range. It covers an area of 185.37 square kilometres (71.57 sq mi). Cristal Peak (Pico Cristal) is the highest point in the park, with an elevation of 1,300 m (4,300 ft).

== Flora and fauna ==
Pine forests dominate, especially the Cuban pine (Pinus cubensis), which can reach a height of 30 m (98 ft) in this area. There are also ferns, orchids, and mahogany and cedar trees.

There are many bird species in residence, such as the Cuban trogon (Cuba's national bird), the bee hummingbird (the smallest known bird), the Cuban parrot, and possibly the ivory-billed woodpecker (though it was last seen in Cuba in 1987 and may be extinct).

The endangered Cuban solenodon (Solenodon cubanus), a small, shrew-like mammal and the hutia, a moderately large rodent, can be found here.

== Conservation ==
The park was created by presidential decree on 24 April 1930, initially covering an area of 26,800 hectares (66,000 acres), to protect the flora and fauna, but in 1958 it was acknowledged that little had been done in the way of conservation.

A research center established in 1988 in Pinares de Mayarí monitors the ecology of the region.
