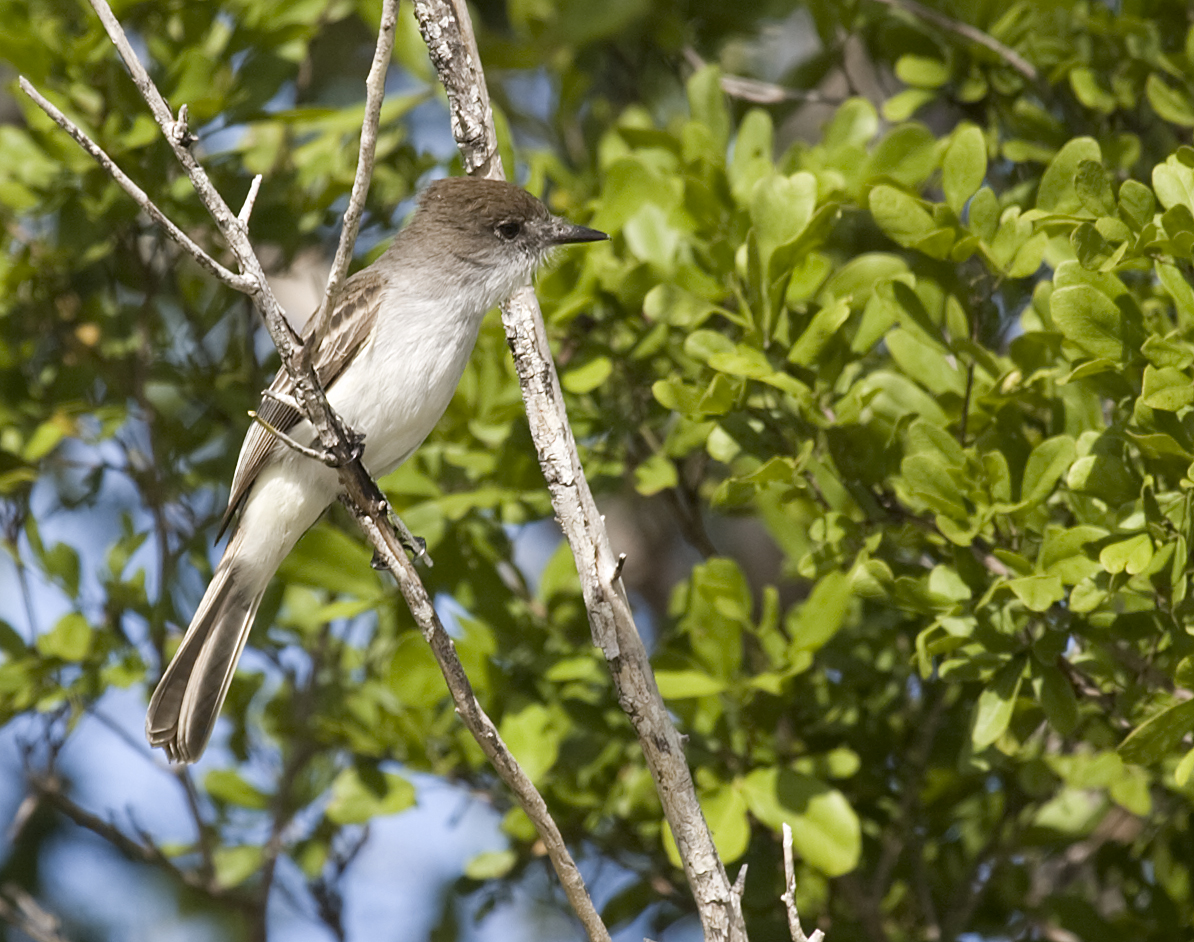
- In Ciego de Avila Province, Cuba

Conservation status
- Least Concern (IUCN 3.1)

Scientific classification
- Kingdom: Animalia
- Phylum: Chordata
- Class: Aves
- Order: Passeriformes
- Family: Tyrannidae
- Genus: Myiarchus
- Species: M. sagrae

Binomial name
- Myiarchus sagrae (Gundlach, 1852)

= La Sagra's flycatcher =

Species of bird

La Sagra's flycatcher (Myiarchus sagrae) is a passerine bird in the family Tyrannidae, the tyrant flycatchers. It is found in Cuba, the Bahamas, and Grand Cayman in the West Indies and as a vagrant to Alabama and Florida.

== Taxonomy and systematics ==
La Sagra's flycatcher was formally described as Muscicapa sagre, mistakenly placing it in the Old World flycatcher family. At times it and the stolid flycatcher (Myiarchus stolidus) have been considered conspecific.

La Sagra's flycatcher has two subspecies, the nominate M. s. sagrae (Gundlach, 1852) and M. s. lucaysiensis (Bryant, 1867). This treatment might not be final, as some evidence places M. s. sagrae as more closely related to the nominate subspecies of the stolid flycatcher than to M. s. lucaysiensis.

The English name and specific epithet of La Sagra's flycatcher honor Ramón de la Sagra, who "was the first to make it known to the public".

== Description ==
La Sagra's flycatcher is 19 to 22 cm (7.5 to 8.7 in) long and weighs 14 to 29 g (0.49 to 1.0 oz). The sexes have the same plumage. Adults of the nominate subspecies have a smoky olive-brown crown that is slightly lighter on its front. Unusual in Myiarchus flycatchers, their crown has a flat appearance. Their face is ashy gray. Their upperparts are mostly olive-brown with some rufescence on the uppertail coverts. Their wings are mostly brown with thin rufous edges on the outer webs of the primaries and pale grayish white edges on the outer webs of the secondaries and tertials. The wing's greater and median coverts have grayish white tips that show as two faint wing bars. Their tail is mostly brown with rufous on all but the innermost and outermost feathers. Their throat, breast, and upper belly are pale ashen gray that becomes whitish on their belly and slightly yellowish white on the flanks and undertail coverts. Subspecies M. s. lucaysiensis is larger than the nominate and has rufous on it outermost tail feathers. Both subspecies have a dark iris, a dark (sometimes dusky) bill, and dark legs and feet.

== Distribution and habitat ==
The nominate subspecies of La Sagra's flycatcher is found on the mainland of Cuba, on Isla de la Juventud (Isle of Pines), and on Grand Cayman Island. Subspecies M. s. lucaysiensis is found in the Bahama islands. The species has been recorded several times in south Florida and once in Alabama. The Florida sightings have all been of subspecies M. s. lucaysiensis.

La Sagra's flycatcher inhabits a wide variety of landscapes in the tropical and lower subtropical zones. These include pine woodland, evergreen forest, mixed conifer-deciduous forest, mangroves, and scrublands. It has been recorded at all elevations from sea level to 1,500 m (4,900 ft).

== Behavior ==
=== Movement ===
La Sagra's flycatcher is a year-round resident but as noted above individuals have wandered from their normal range.

=== Feeding ===
La Sagra's flycatcher feeds on insects, fruits, and seeds. It typically forages in the habitat's understory, snatching prey and fruit while briefly hovering after a sally from a perch.

=== Breeding ===
La Sagra's flycatcher breeds between April and July. Its nest is made from plant fibers, hair, and feathers placed in a cavity in a tree or bamboo stalk. The usual clutch is two to four eggs. Nothing else is known about the species' breeding biology.

=== Vocalization ===
The song of the nominate subspecies of La Sagra's flycatcher is weeet-ze-weer and its call a huit. That of M. s. lucaysiensis is "a combination of [a] modified huit note and rolling brrr-r-r with no whistled element".

== Status ==
The IUCN has assessed La Sagra's flycatcher as being of Least Concern. It has a large range; its population size is not known and is believed to be decreasing. No immediate threats have been identified. It is considered common in Cuba, the Cayman Islands, and the northern Bahamas and uncommon in the southern Bahamas. It is "[s]usceptible, at least on smaller islands, to natural and anthropogenic habitat loss, such as that caused by hurricanes and deliberate habitat destruction".
