= Carretera Central (Cuba) =

Highway in Cuba

Coordinates: 22°02′32″N 84°16′18″W

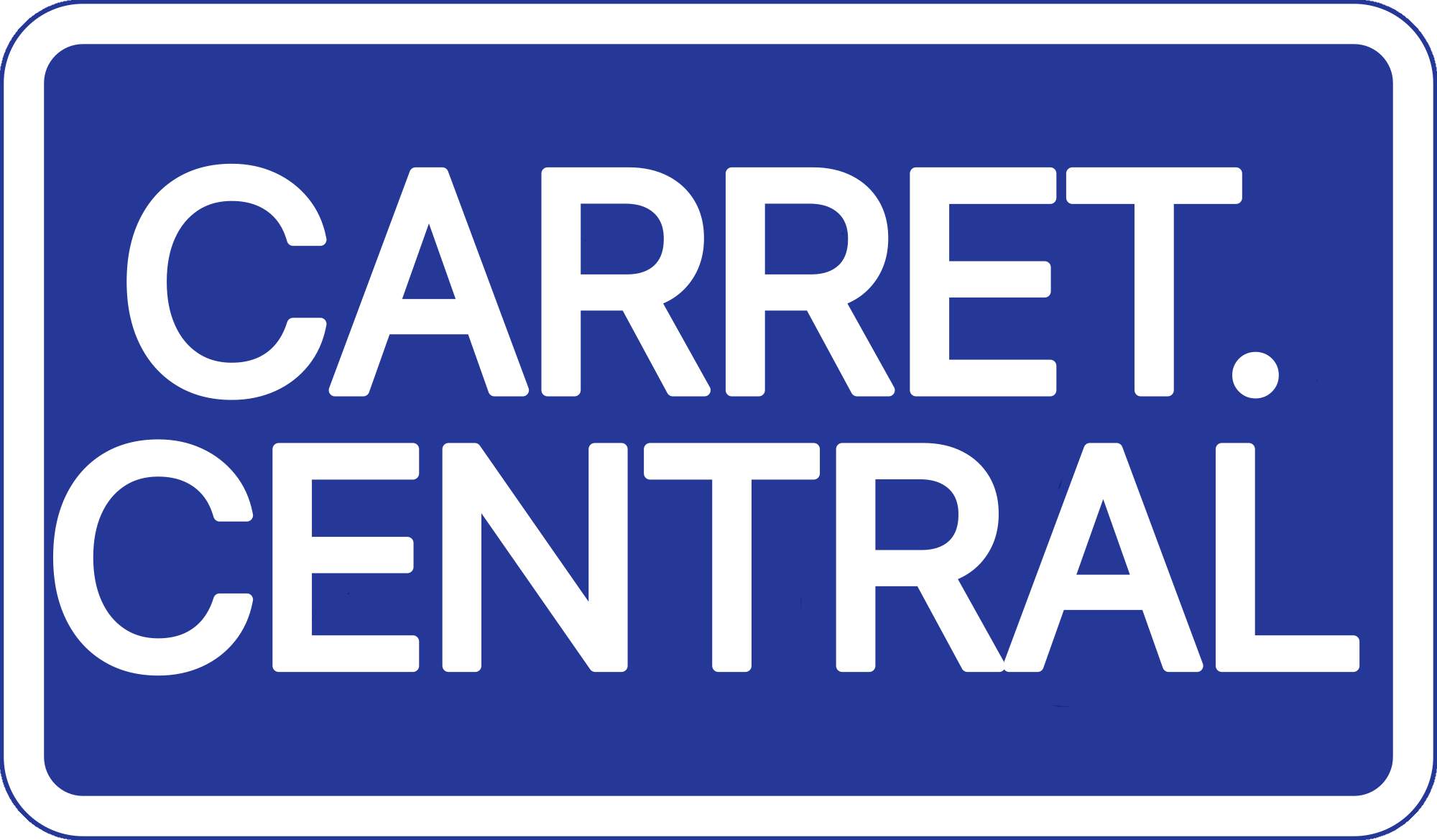
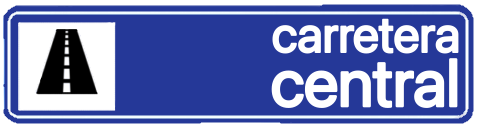
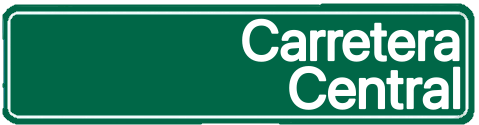
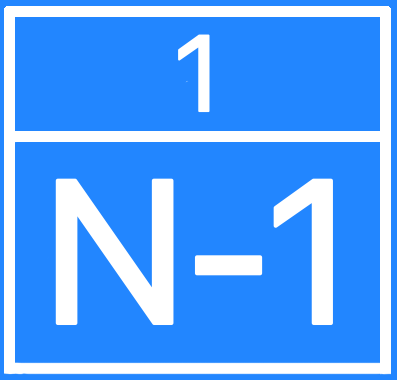
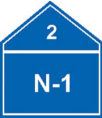
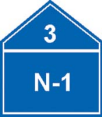
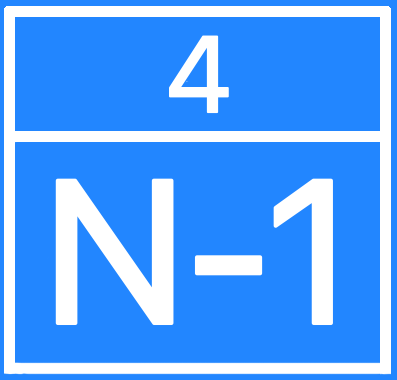
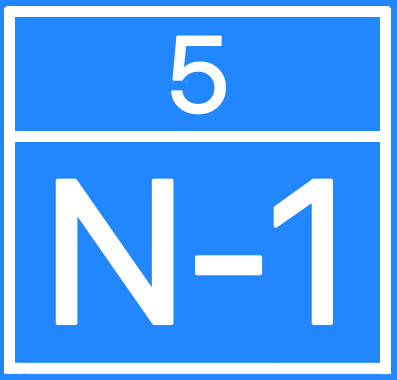
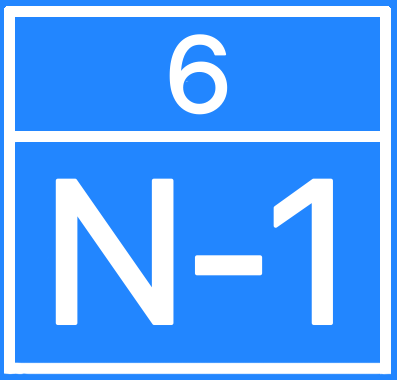
Carretera Central (CC)
- Central Road
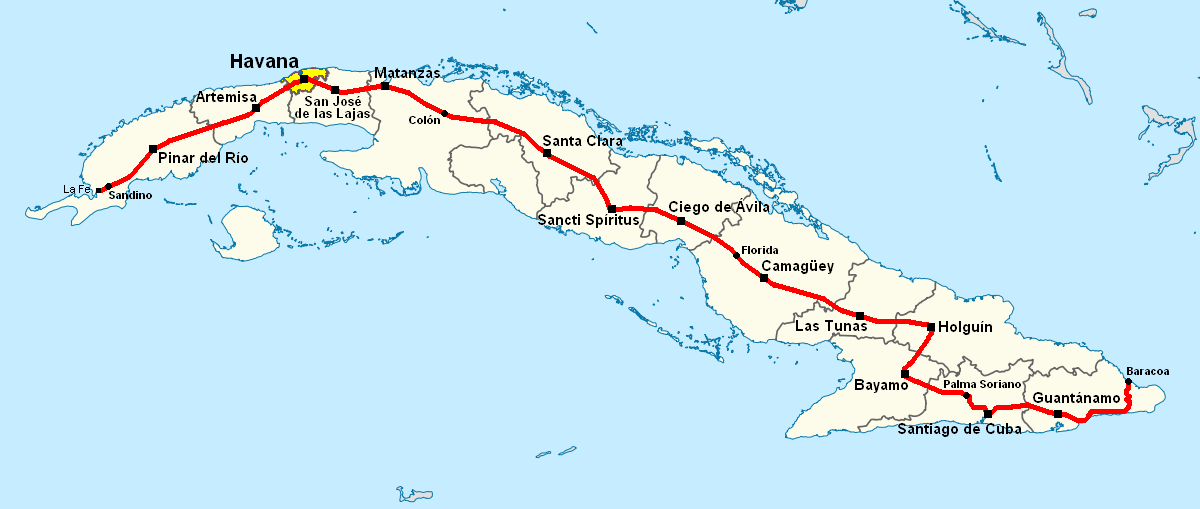

Route information
- Length: 1,435 km (892 mi)
- Existed: 1927–present

1–N–1
- West end: 1–22 in La Fe
- Major intersections: 1–241 in Pinar del Río
- East end: 2–N–1 near Bayate

2–N–1
- West end: 1–N–1 near Bayate
- Major intersections: Vial al Autopista in Artemisa; 2–39 in Guanajay; 2–101 near Arroyo Arenas; A2 in San Francisco de Paula; 2–400 near Cuatro Caminos; 2–860 near Ganuza
- East end: 3–N–1 near Ceiba Mocha

3–N–1
- West end: 2–N–1 near Ceiba Mocha
- Major intersections: 3–I–3 in Matanzas; 3–101 in Coliseo; 3–202 in Jovellanos; 3–252 in Colón
- East end: 4–N–1 near Los Arabos

4–N–1
- West end: 3–N–1 near Los Arabos
- Major intersections: 4–112 in Esperanza Santa Clara Beltway in Santa Clara A1 near Punta de Diamantés; 4–531 near Sancti Spiritus; Circuito Sur extension in Sancti Spíritus; Majá–Taguasco Road in El Majá
- East end: 5–N–1 near Jatibonico

5–N–1
- West end: 4–N–1 near Jatibonico
- Major intersections: 5–151 in Ciego de Ávila
- East end: 6–N–1 near Jobabito

6–N–1
- West end: 5–N–1 near Jobatito
- Major intersections: 6–123 in Las Tunas; 6–152 near Las Tunas; 6–20 in Santiago de Cuba; A1 in Dos Caminos; A1 near Cabaña
- East end: 6–I–23 in Baracoa

Location
- Country: Cuba
- Major cities: La Fé, Sandino, Pinar del Río, Artemisa, Havana, San José de las Lajas, Matanzas, Colón, Santa Clara, Placetas, Sancti Spíritus, Ciego de Ávila, Florida, Camagüey, Las Tunas, Holguín, Bayamo, Palma Soriano, Santiago de Cuba, Guantánamo, Baracoa

Highway system
- Roads in Cuba

The Carretera Central (CC), meaning "Central Road", is a west-east highway spanning the length of the island of Cuba. The route is numbered N–1, with it being split into 6 regions, being 1–N–1, 2–N–1, 3–N–1, 4–N–1, 5–N–1, and 6–N–1.

== History ==
Formal construction began in 1927 during the Gerardo Machado administration and its original layout of 1,139 km (707.7 mi) was completed in 1931. It runs along the island of Cuba from west to east, between Pinar del Río and Oriente. It is a two-way single road. It represented an extraordinary economic value during Machado and Fulgencio Batista's administrations. It facilitated faster transportation and effective inter-province commuting.

The road was originally signed N–1, with a prefix depending on the former province it was in, being 1–N–1 for Pinar del Río Province, 2–N–1 for La Habana Province, 3–N–1 for Matanzas Province, 4–N–1 for Santa Clara Province, 5–N–1 for Camagüey Province, and 6–N–1 for Oriente Province, although now the numbering system is largely unused, with most signs saying an abbreviated version of “Carretera Central”.

== Route ==
=== Description ===
The Carretera Central starts in the village of La Fe, a hamlet of Sandino, in the western province of Pinar del Río, and links all major cities and province capitals except Cienfuegos. It runs about 1,435 km (892 mi) to Baracoa in the eastern Guantánamo province.

=== Table ===
The table below shows the route of the Carretera Central. Note: Provincial seats are shown in bold; the names shown under brackets in the section "Municipality" indicate the municipal seats.

Settlement	Municipality	Province
La Fe	Sandino	Pinar del Río
Sandino	(Sandino)	Pinar del Río
San Julián	Sandino	Pinar del Río
Isabel Rubio	Guane	Pinar del Río
Sábalo	Guane	Pinar del Río
San Juan y Martínez	(San Juan y Martínez)	Pinar del Río
Río Seco	San Juan y Martínez	Pinar del Río
Santa María	San Luis	Pinar del Río
**Pinar del Río**	(Pinar del Río)	Pinar del Río
Consolación del Sur	(Consolación del Sur)	Pinar del Río
Entronque de Herradura	Consolación del Sur	Pinar del Río
San Diego de los Baños	Los Palacios	Pinar del Río
Los Palacios	(Los Palacios)	Pinar del Río
Santa Cruz de los Pinos	San Cristóbal	Artemisa
San Cristóbal	(San Cristóbal)	Artemisa
Candelaria	(Candelaria)	Artemisa
Las Mangas	Artemisa	Artemisa
**Artemisa**	(Artemisa)	Artemisa
Guanajay	(Guanajay)	Artemisa
Caimito	(Caimito)	Artemisa
Bauta	(Bauta)	Artemisa
**Havana**	The CC crosses the municipal boroughs of La Lisa, Marianao, Cerro, Centro Habana, Regla, San Miguel del Padrón, Cotorro	Havana
Jamaica	San José de las Lajas	Mayabeque
**San José de las Lajas**	(San José de las Lajas)	Mayabeque
Catalina de Güines	Güines	Mayabeque
Madruga	(Madruga)	Mayabeque
Ceiba Mocha	Matanzas	Matanzas
**Matanzas**	(Matanzas)	Matanzas
Guanábana	Matanzas	Matanzas
Limonar	(Limonar)	Matanzas
Coliseo	Jovellanos	Matanzas
Jovellanos	(Jovellanos)	Matanzas
Perico	(Perico)	Matanzas
Sergio González	Colón	Matanzas
Colón	(Colón)	Matanzas
Agüica	Colón	Matanzas
Los Arabos	(Los Arabos)	Matanzas
San Pedro de Mayabón	Los Arabos	Matanzas
Cascajal	Santo Domingo	Villa Clara
Mordazo	Santo Domingo	Villa Clara
Manacas	Santo Domingo	Villa Clara
George Washington	Santo Domingo	Villa Clara
Santo Domingo	(Santo Domingo)	Villa Clara
Veintiseis de Julio	Santo Domingo	Villa Clara
Jicotea	Ranchuelo	Villa Clara
Esperanza	Ranchuelo	Villa Clara
Antón Díaz	Santa Clara	Villa Clara
**Santa Clara**	(Santa Clara)	Villa Clara
Manajanabo	Santa Clara	Villa Clara
Falcón	Placetas	Villa Clara
Placetas	(Placetas)	Villa Clara
Oyo de Agua	Placetas	Villa Clara
Cabaiguán	(Cabaiguán)	Sancti Spíritus
Guayos	Cabaiguán	Sancti Spíritus
**Sancti Spíritus**	(Sancti Spíritus)	Sancti Spíritus
El Majá	Jatibonico	Sancti Spíritus
Jatibonico	(Jatibonico)	Sancti Spíritus
Majagua	(Majagua)	Ciego de Ávila
Guayacanes	Majagua	Ciego de Ávila
Jicotea	Ciego de Ávila	Ciego de Ávila
**Ciego de Ávila**	(Ciego de Ávila)	Ciego de Ávila
Colorado	Baraguá	Ciego de Ávila
Gaspar	(Baraguá)	Ciego de Ávila
Piedrecitas	Céspedes	Camagüey
Céspedes	(Céspedes)	Camagüey
Florida	(Florida)	Camagüey
La Vallita	Florida	Camagüey
**Camagüey**	(Camagüey)	Camagüey
Vidot	Jimaguayú	Camagüey
Ignacio	Jimaguayú	Camagüey
Siboney	Sibanicú	Camagüey
Sibanicú	(Sibanicú)	Camagüey
Cascorro	Guáimaro	Camagüey
Martí	Guáimaro	Camagüey
Guáimaro	(Guáimaro)	Camagüey
Jobabito	Las Tunas	Las Tunas
Bartle	Las Tunas	Las Tunas
**Las Tunas**	(Las Tunas)	Las Tunas
Calixto	(Majibacoa)	Las Tunas
Gaston	Majibacoa	Las Tunas
Las Parras	Majibacoa	Las Tunas
Buenaventura	(Calixto García)	Holguín
Las Calabazas	Calixto García	Holguín
Yareyal	Holguín	Holguín
**Holguín**	(Holguín)	Holguín
Frank País Airport	Holguín	Holguín
Cacocum	(Cacocum)	Holguín
Limpio Chiquito	Cacocum	Holguín
Cauto Cristo	(Cauto Cristo)	Granma
Babiney	Jiguaní	Granma
**Bayamo**	(Bayamo)	Granma
Santa Rita	Jiguaní	Granma
Jiguaní	(Jiguaní)	Granma
Baire	Contramaestre	Santiago de Cuba
Contramaestre	(Contramaestre)	Santiago de Cuba
Guaninao	Contramaestre	Santiago de Cuba
Palma Soriano	(Palma Soriano)	Santiago de Cuba
La Clarita	Palma Soriano	Santiago de Cuba
El Cobre	Santiago de Cuba	Santiago de Cuba
**Santiago de Cuba**	(Santiago de Cuba)	Santiago de Cuba
El Cristo	Santiago de Cuba	Santiago de Cuba
Dos Caminos	San Luis	Santiago de Cuba
Alto Songo	Songo-La Maya	Santiago de Cuba
La Maya	(Songo-La Maya)	Santiago de Cuba
Yerba de Guinea	(Songo-La Maya)	Santiago de Cuba
Niceto Pérez	(Niceto Pérez)	Guantánamo
**Guantánamo**	(Guantánamo)	Guantánamo
Grajales Airport / Paraguay	Guantánamo	Guantánamo
Maqueicito	Manuel Tames	Guantánamo
Yateritas	San Antonio del Sur	Guantánamo
Tortuguilla	San Antonio del Sur	Guantánamo
Baitiquiri	San Antonio del Sur	Guantánamo
San Antonio del Sur	(San Antonio del Sur)	Guantánamo
Imías	(Imías)	Guantánamo
Cajobabo	Imías	Guantánamo
La Farola (viaduct)	Imías	Guantánamo
Sabanilla	Baracoa	Guantánamo
Cabacú	Baracoa	Guantánamo
Baracoa	(Baracoa)	Guantánamo

== Gallery ==
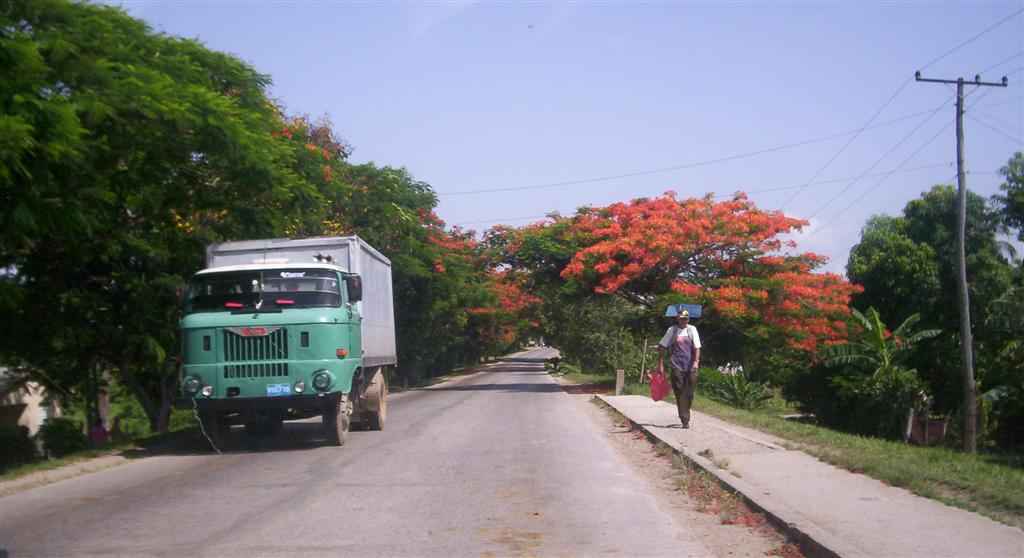
Carretera Central near Santo Domingo, Villa Clara province

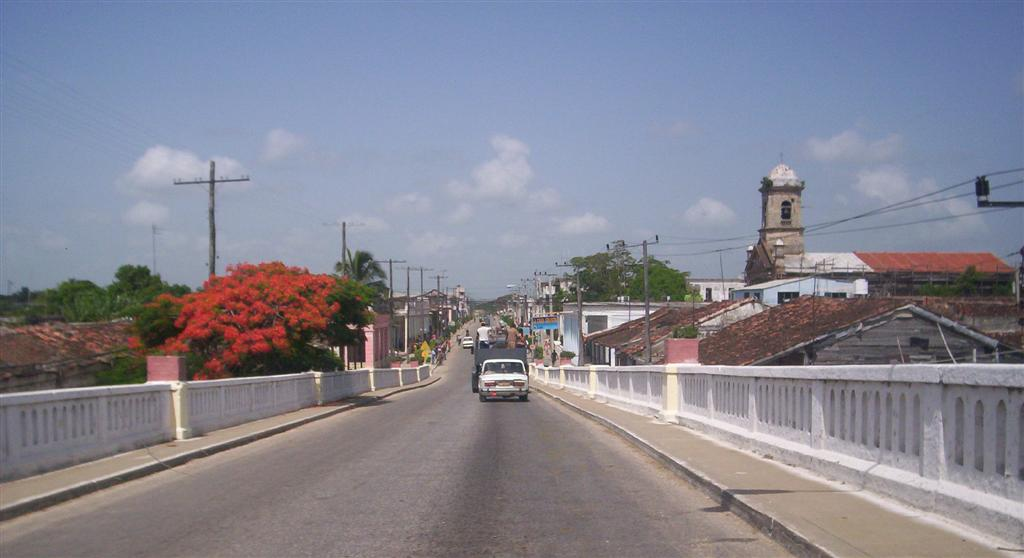
Through Santo Domingo, Villa Clara province

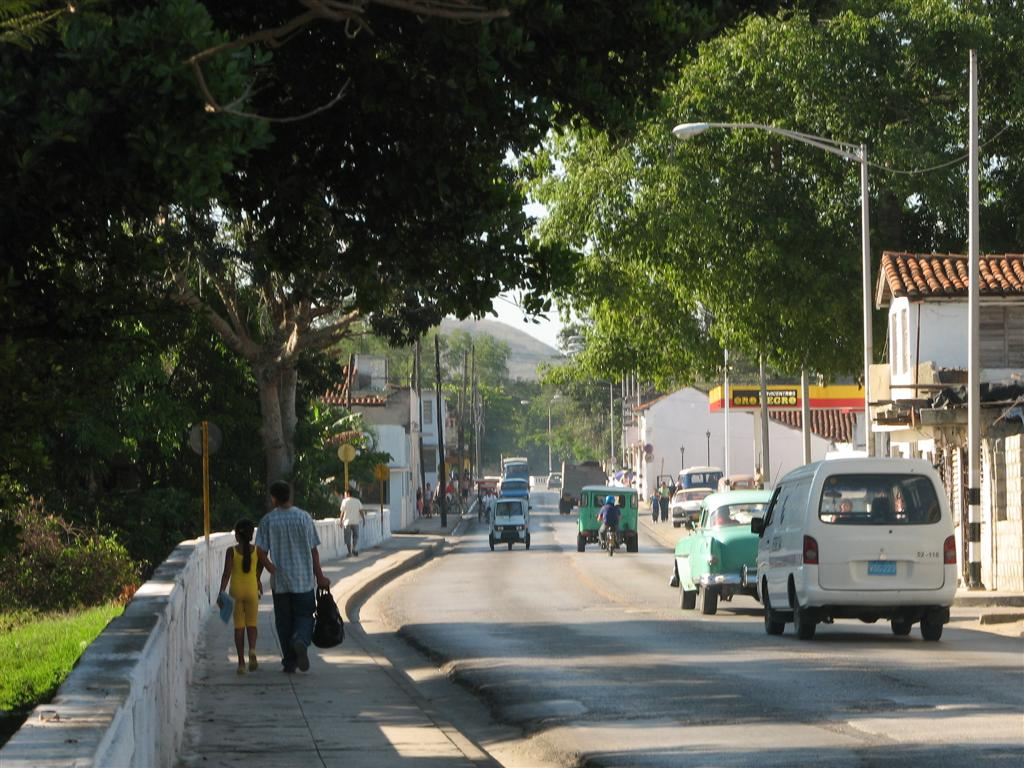
Through Santa Clara

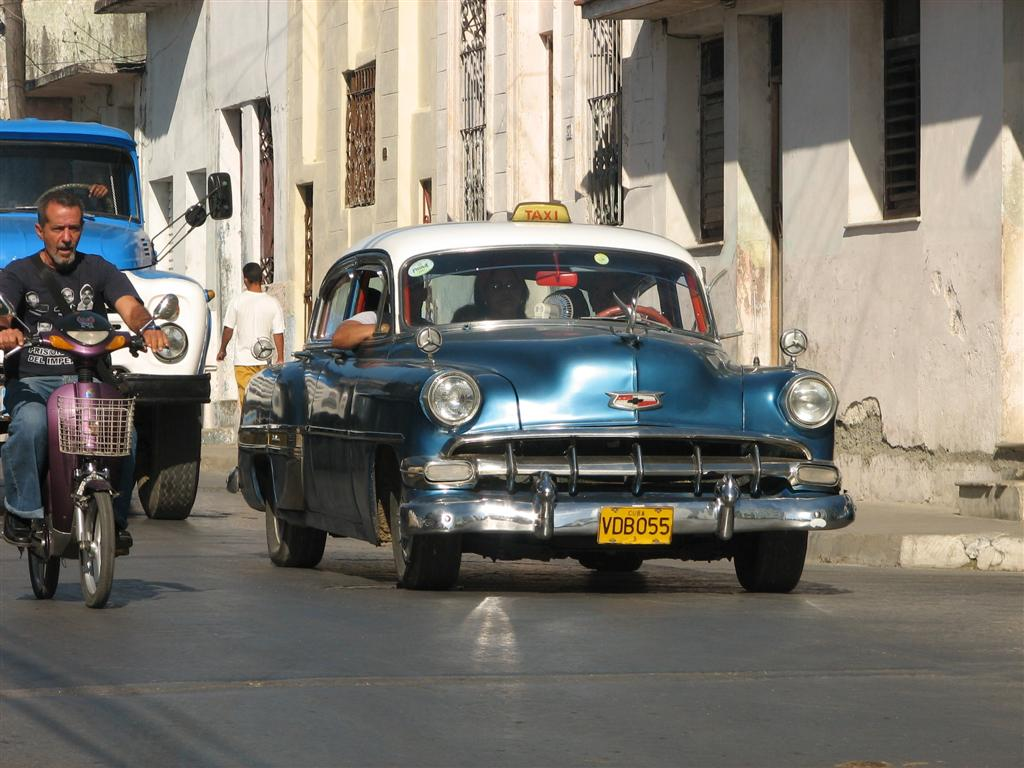
Through Santa Clara

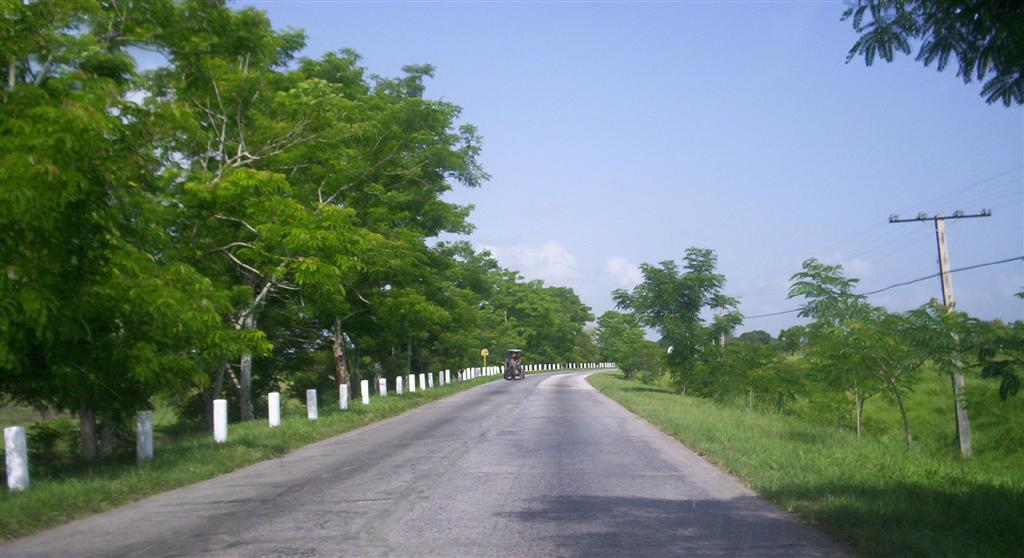
Carretera Central in Villa Clara province

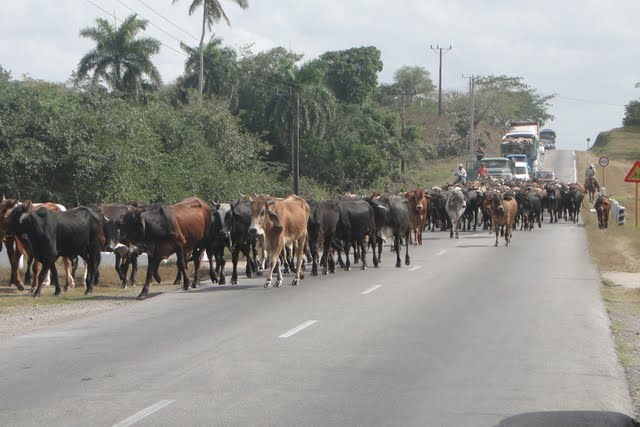
Traffic jam on Carretera

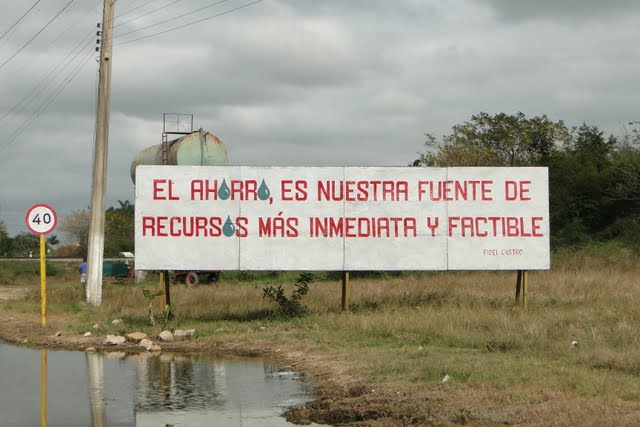
Political poster on Carretera

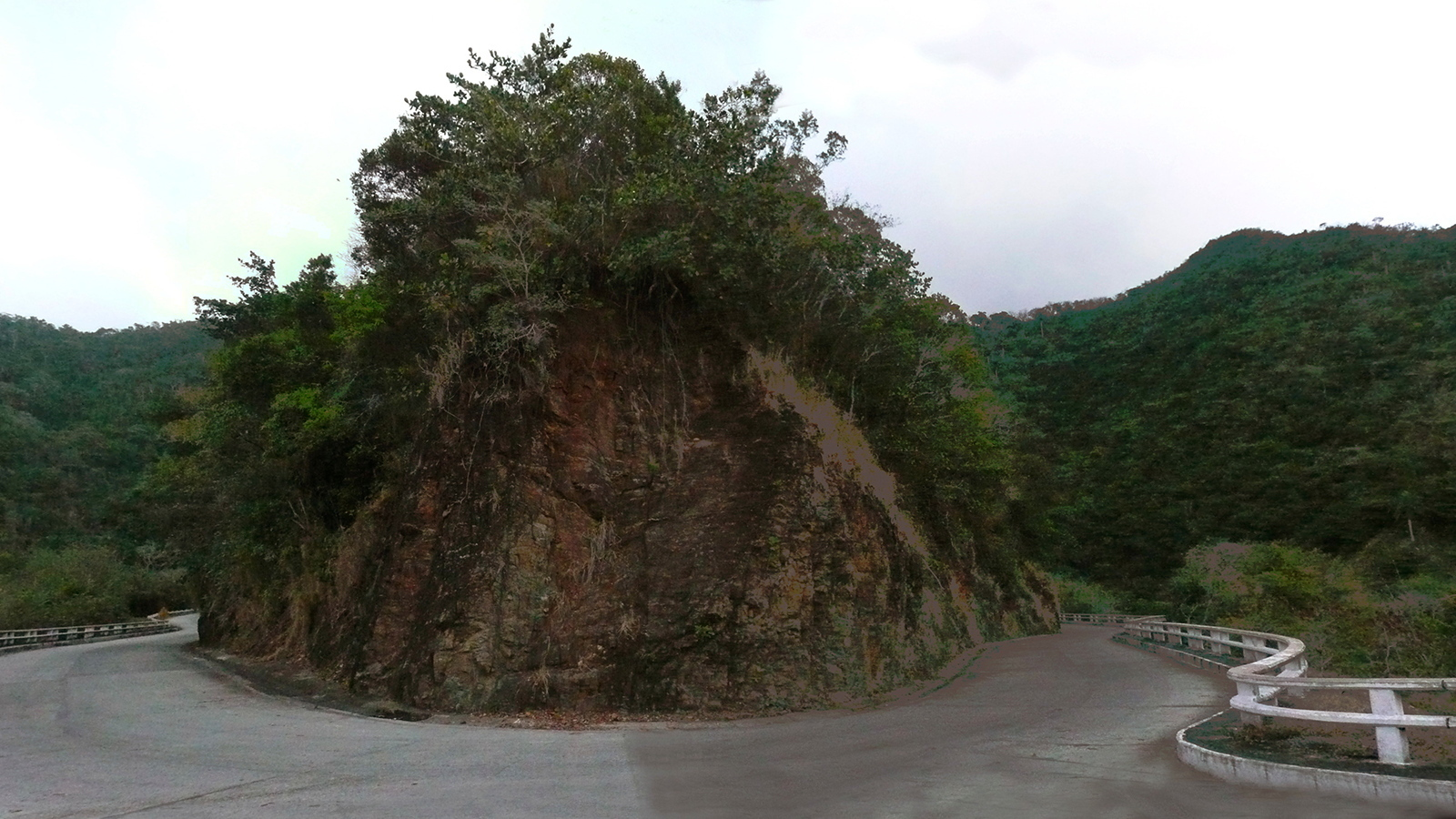
La Farola mountain pass between Imías and Baracoa

== See also ==
- Roads in Cuba
- Vía Blanca
