= 1908 Atlantic hurricane season =

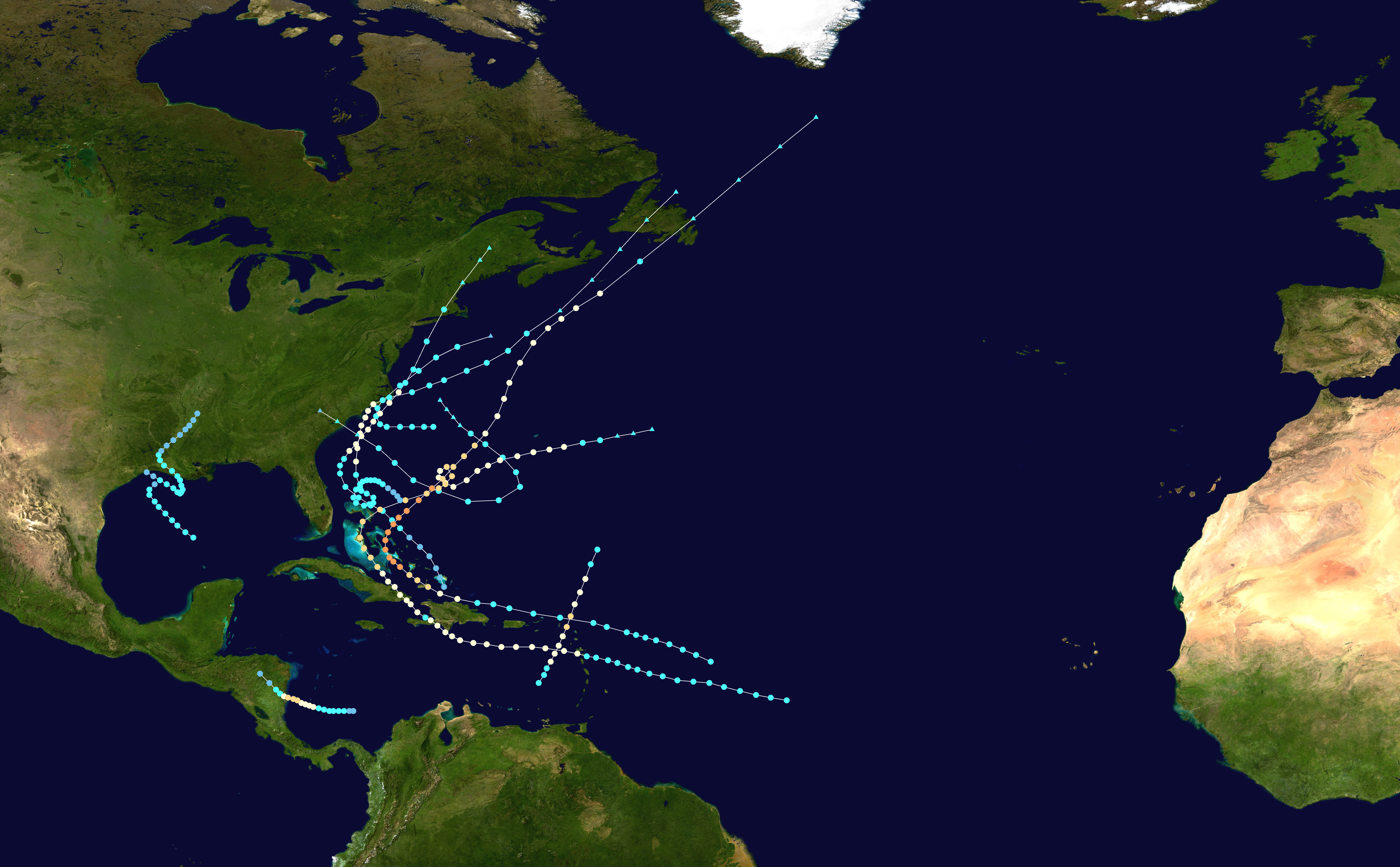
- Season summary map

Seasonal boundaries
- First system formed: March 6, 1908
- Last system dissipated: October 23, 1908

Strongest storm
- Name: Six
  - Maximum winds: 120 mph (195 km/h) (1-minute sustained)

Seasonal statistics
- Total depressions: 13
- Total storms: 10
- Hurricanes: 6
- Major hurricanes (Cat. 3+): 1
- Total fatalities: At least 37
- Total damage: Unknown

Related articles
- 1900s Pacific hurricane seasons; 1902-19 Pacific typhoon seasons; 1900s North Indian Ocean cyclone seasons

The 1908 Atlantic hurricane season was an active Atlantic hurricane season. Thirteen tropical cyclones formed, of which ten became tropical storms; six became hurricanes, and one of those strengthened into a major hurricane – tropical cyclones that reach at least Category 3 on the modern day Saffir–Simpson scale. The season's first system developed on March 6, and the last storm transitioned into an extratropical cyclone on October 23.

1908 remains the only Atlantic hurricane season on record to feature two hurricanes prior to the month of June. The season's most intense tropical cyclone peaked as a Category 3 hurricane with maximum sustained winds of 120 mph (190 km/h) in mid-September. Significant damage and at least 26 deaths occurred in Turks and Caicos Islands and the Bahamas as a result of this storm. Most of the other systems also impacted land. In May, the second storm caused thousands of dollars in damage and one indirect death in the Northeastern United States. The next system caused flooding in North Carolina, resulting in the deaths of two children. In late September and early October, the eighth system caused considerable damage in portions of the Greater Antilles and the Bahamas, leaving six people dead. A hurricane which struck the Caribbean coast of Nicaragua inflicted severe damage in several communities and killed at least two people. Overall, the tropical cyclones of the season collectively caused at least 37 fatalities.

== Season summary ==
Tropical cyclogenesis began on March 6, 1908, when the first system was initially detected northeast of the Lesser Antilles. It was the only off-season Atlantic tropical cyclone to reach Category 2 strength since the beginning of official records in 1851. On May 24, the next system developed near the Turks and Caicos Islands. When it intensified into a hurricane on May 28, the 1908 season became the only on record in which two systems reached hurricane status prior to the month of June. Thereafter, activity ceased for nearly two months, until the third cyclone formed northeast of the Bahamas on July 24, followed by another system forming in the northwestern Gulf of Mexico on July 29. The month of August featured two cyclones, a tropical depression and a tropical storm. September was the most active month, with five systems developing, including two hurricanes, one tropical storm, and two tropical depressions. In October, a hurricane and a tropical storm developed, the latter of which became extratropical on October 23, ending seasonal activity.

The season had a total of 10 tropical storms, 6 of which intensified into a hurricane. Re-analysis by José F. Partagás and Henry F. Diaz in 1997 resulted in the addition of the second system, while Christopher Landsea et al. added the sixth system in 2004 as part of the Atlantic hurricane reanalysis project. Seven out of the ten systems reaching at least tropical storm intensity made landfall during the season. Collectively, the tropical cyclones of the 1908 Atlantic hurricane season caused at least 37 fatalities.

The season's activity was reflected with an accumulated cyclone energy (ACE) rating of 95. ACE is a metric used to express the energy used by a tropical cyclone during its lifetime. Therefore, a storm with a longer duration will have high values of ACE. It is only calculated at six-hour increments in which specific tropical and subtropical systems are either at or above sustained wind speeds of 39 mph (63 km/h), which is the threshold for tropical storm intensity. Thus, tropical depressions are not included here.

== Systems ==
=== Hurricane One ===
- Category 2 hurricane (SSHWS)
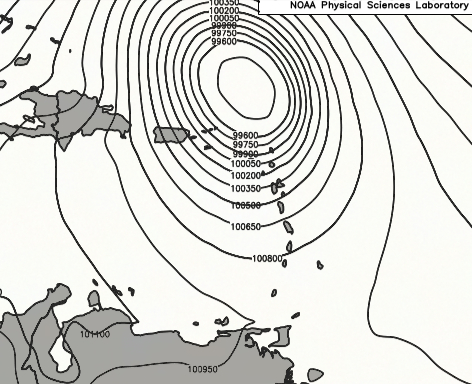
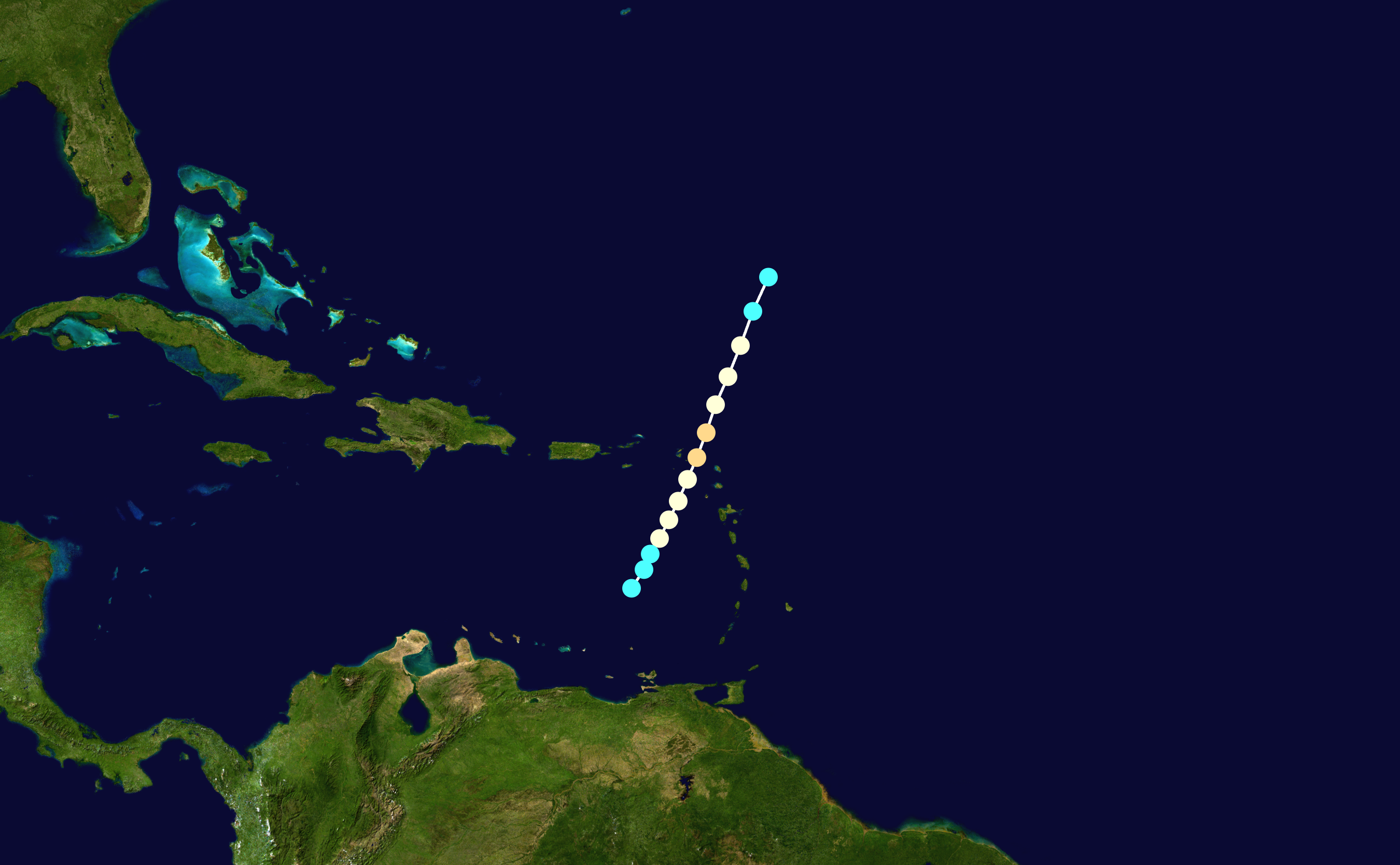
- Duration: March 6 – March 9
- Peak intensity: 100 mph (155 km/h) (1-min); <984 mbar (hPa)

The 1908 March hurricane was initially observed by a ship at 12:00 UTC on March 6 while located about 430 mi (690 km) northeast of Barbuda. Tracking in an unusual south-southwest direction, the storm intensified into a Category 1 hurricane on the modern day Saffir–Simpson hurricane wind scale. Shortly before reaching the United States Virgin Islands early on March 8, the hurricane intensified into a Category 2 hurricane, peaking with maximum sustained winds of 100 mph (160 km/h) and a minimum barometric pressure of 984 mbar (29.1 inHg), which was observed outside the center in Nevis. Once in the Caribbean on March 8, the system slowly began to weaken, losing hurricane status the following morning. The storm was last noted about 130 mi (210 km) north of Blanquilla Island late on March 9.

On Saint Barthélemy, buildings were damaged or completely blown down. Winds in Saint Martin toppled tents and did considerable damaged to crops. The city of Basseterre on Saint Kitts saw winds damaging winds, where rainfall totaled 4 in (100 mm). The storm also beached at least 24 small crafts and boats, and severely damaged crops along the island. At least one man drowned when his ship sunk.

=== Hurricane Two ===
- Category 1 hurricane (SSHWS)
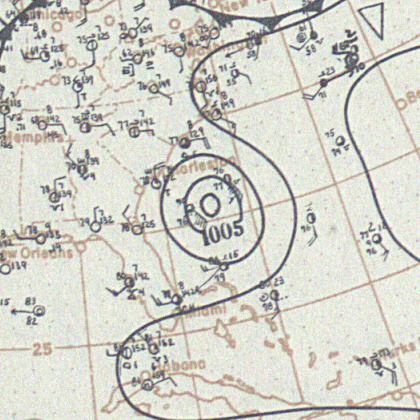
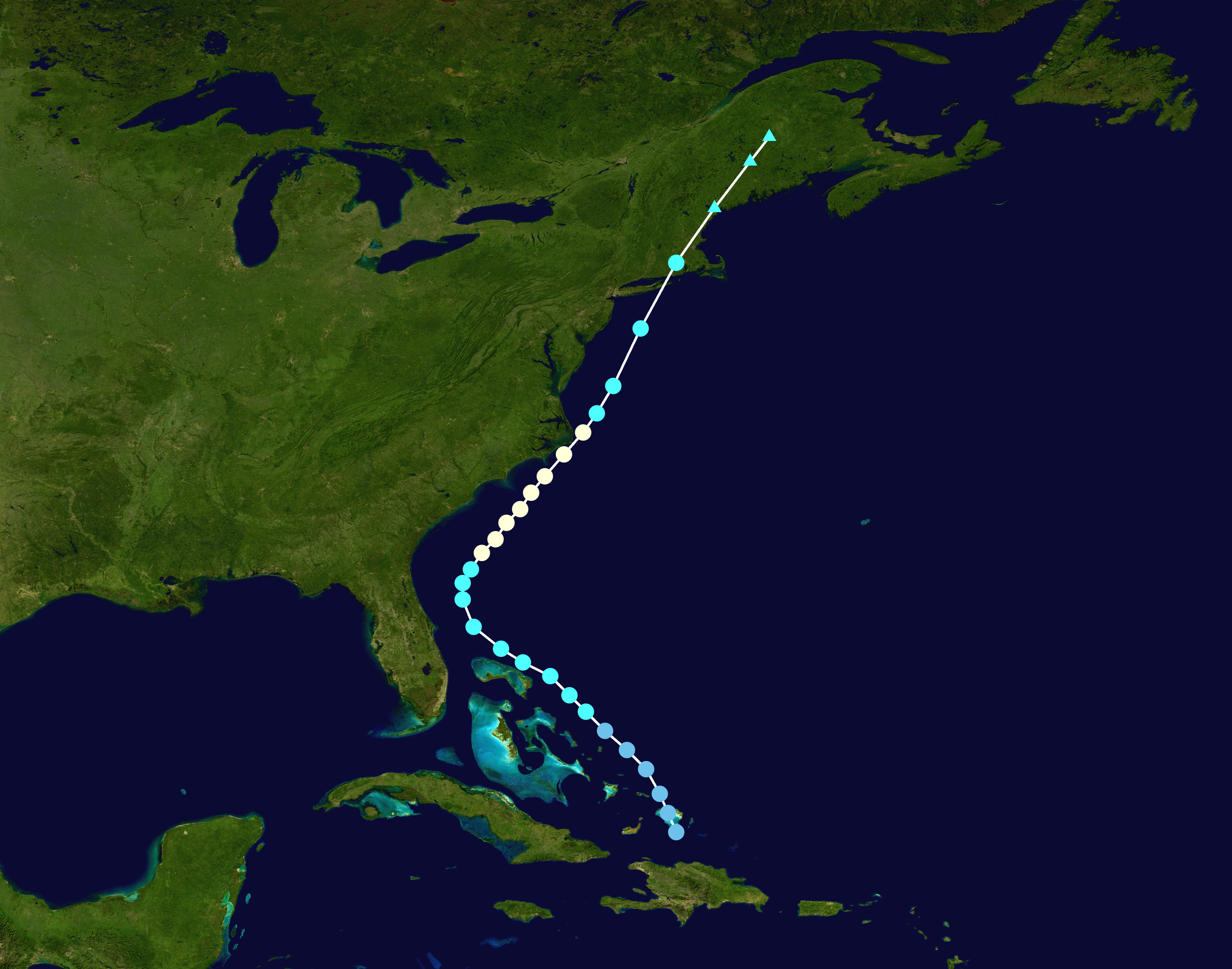
- Duration: May 24 – May 31
- Peak intensity: 75 mph (120 km/h) (1-min); 989 mbar (hPa)

A tropical depression developed on May 24 at 12:00 UTC about 50 mi (80 km) southwest of Cockburn Town, Turks and Caicos Islands. Moving northwestward, the depression struck the Turks and Caicos Islands. Around 06:00 UTC on May 26, the depression intensified into a tropical storm. By late on May 27, the storm curved northeastward. The cyclone strengthened into a hurricane by 06:00 UTC the following day, becoming one of only three May hurricanes in the 20th century, with the others being Able in 1951 and Alma in 1970. The cyclone made landfall west of Cape Hatteras, North Carolina, with winds of 75 mph (120 km/h) around 21:00 UTC on May 29. A few hours later, the cyclone re-emerged into the Atlantic Ocean. Early on May 30, the hurricane weakened to a tropical storm. Accelerating northeastward, the storm struck eastern Long Island, New York, with winds of 40 mph (65 km/h) late on May 30, just prior to making landfall near Noank, Connecticut, at the same intensity around 23:00 UTC. The storm became extratropical over southern Maine early on May 31. The remnants continued northeastward until dissipating over the northern portion of the state several hours later.

In North Carolina, the storm produced sustained winds up to 70 mph (110 km/h) at Morehead City. Winds disrupted communications with towns along the Outer Banks. Rough seas generated by the storm in New Jersey swept away a significant amount of sand, especially at Long Branch. An oceanfront street in the city was closed after waves washed out approximately 300 ft (91 m) of the road. In Rhode Island, storm surge and abnormally high tides wrecked many boats at Narragansett Bay. One person died of exhaustion during the storm and another suffered a serious injury when a tree fell on a car. Damage in the state was estimated in the thousands of dollars.

=== Hurricane Three ===
- Category 1 hurricane (SSHWS)
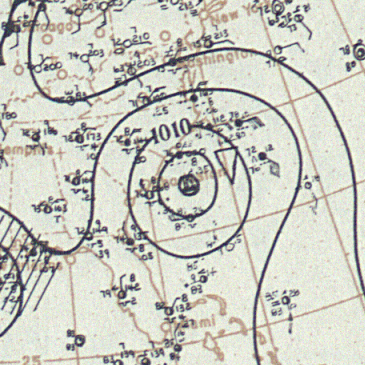
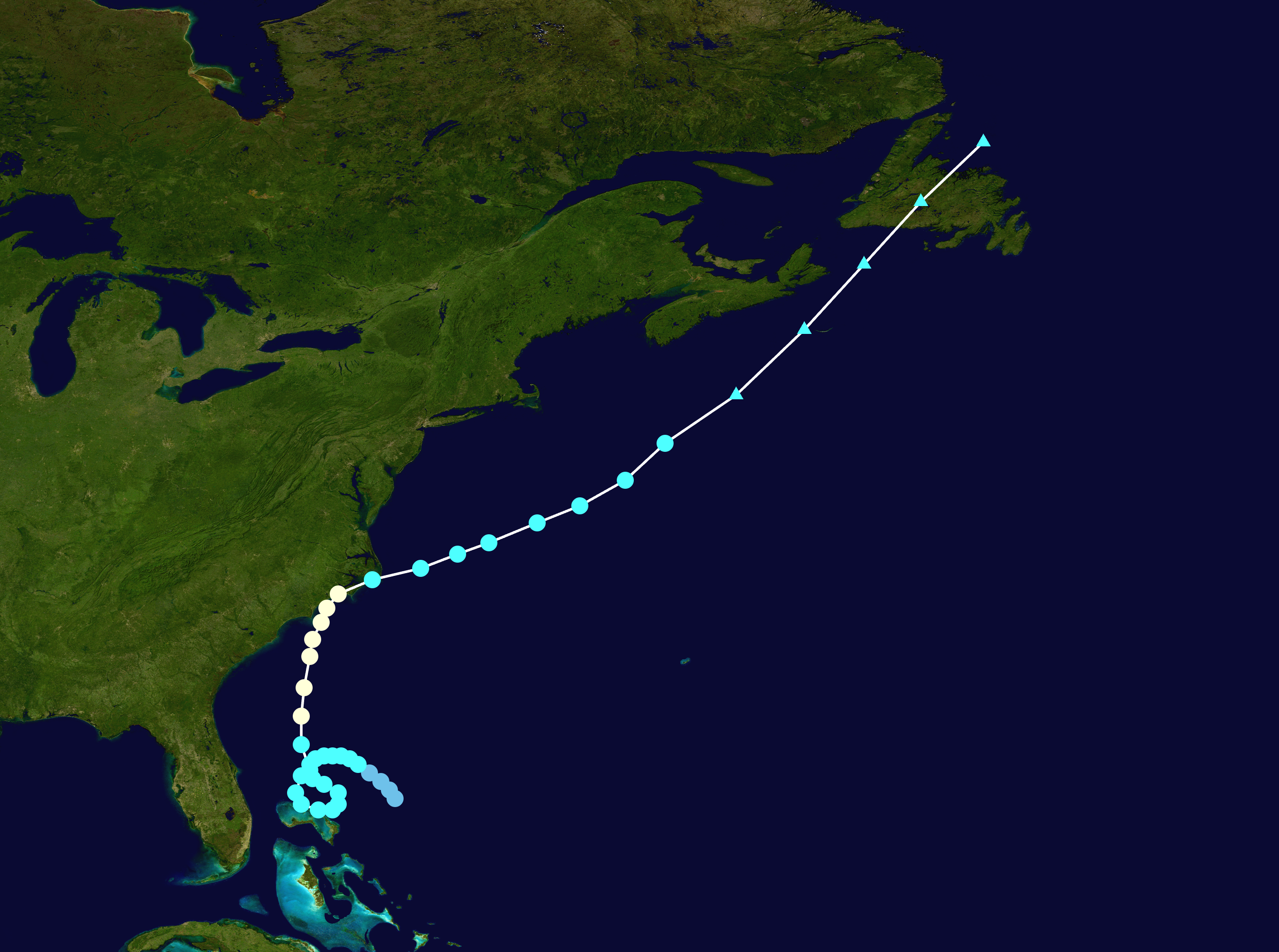
- Duration: July 24 – August 2
- Peak intensity: 80 mph (130 km/h) (1-min); 985 mbar (hPa)

A disturbance developed into a tropical depression about 140 mi (225 km) east-northeast of the Abaco Islands around 12:00 UTC on July 24. Heading northwestward, the depression intensified into a tropical storm about 24 hours later. Thereafter, the cyclone executed a slow cyclonic loop just north of Grand Bahama island, until it turned northward on July 29. Early on the following day, the system intensified into a hurricane, shortly before peaking with maximum sustained winds of 80 mph (130 km/h). Around 11:00 UTC on July 31, the hurricane made landfall in modern-day Emerald Isle, North Carolina, at the same intensity. The system then curved east-northeastward and weakened to a tropical storm just prior to re-emerging into the Atlantic late on July 31. By 18:00 UTC on August 2, the storm transitioned into an extratropical cyclone about 175 mi (280 km) southeast of Baccaro, Nova Scotia. The extratropical remnants continued northeastward across Newfoundland before dissipating on August 3.

Hurricane warnings were issued on July 30 from Hatteras, North Carolina, to Norfolk, Virginia. In North Carolina, the storm produced sustained winds up to 58 mph (93 km/h) at Hatteras. The storm washed away cottages and boardwalks in Wrightsville. Rainfall peaked at 9.45 in (240 mm) in New Bern, while the storm contributed to the total of 9 in (230 mm) of precipitation that fell in Kinston over the course of four days. Flooding submerged the main city streets in Kingston and washed out railroad bridges and tracks. Two children drowned in the town of Roper. In Virginia, the highest known sustained wind speed was 46 mph (75 km/h) at Cape Henry, causing damage to some crops. The extratropical remnants of the storm caused eight deaths in Atlantic Canada after several boats capsized. In Nova Scotia, the storm downed a number of trees and damaged many properties in Halifax. Heavy rainfall also washed out unpaved roads in the city and left them nearly impassable.

=== Tropical Storm Four ===
- Tropical storm (SSHWS)
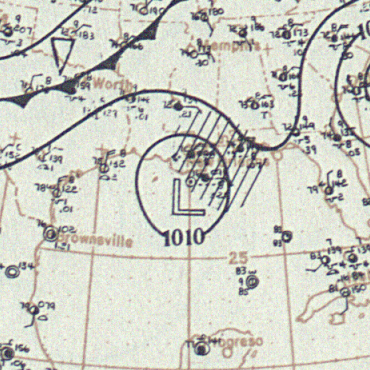
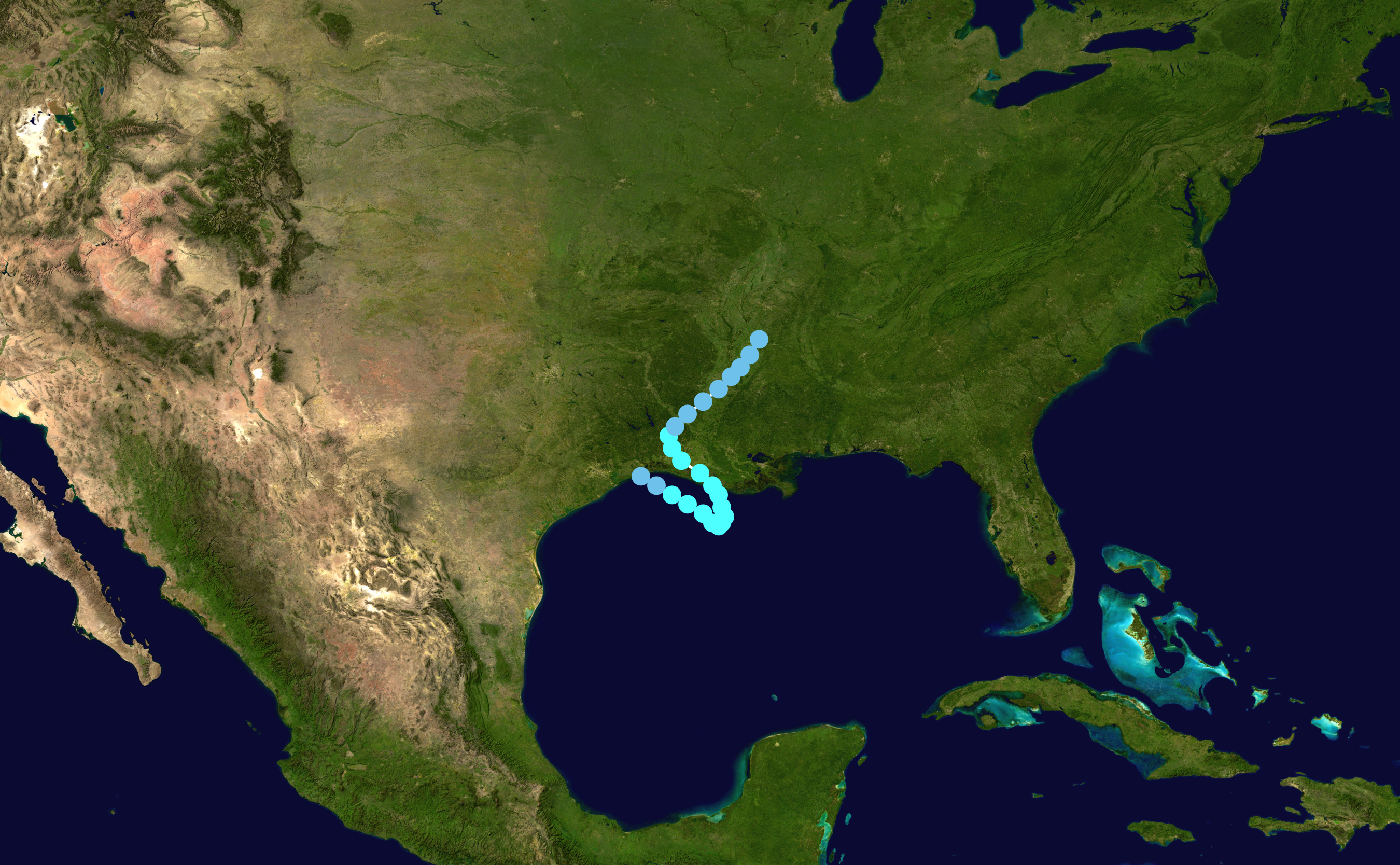
- Duration: July 29 – August 3
- Peak intensity: 60 mph (95 km/h) (1-min);

A tropical depression developed just offshore Sabine Pass, Texas, around 00:00 UTC on July 29. Moving southeastward, the depression intensified into a tropical storm about 12 hours later. Early on July 30, the storm peaked with maximum sustained winds of 60 mph (95 km/h). Eventually, it recurved to the north-northwest and headed toward Louisiana. At 22:00 UTC on July 31, the cyclone made landfall on Marsh Island, Louisiana, at the same intensity. The storm weakened to a tropical depression early on August 2, around the time it curved northeastward. By late on August 3, the system dissipated over northern Mississippi.

The storm dropped heavy rainfall in portions of Louisiana. The city of Franklin recorded 19.62 in (498 mm) of precipitation between July 26 and August 2, including 9.6 in (240 mm) in one day. The coastal parishes of Louisiana experienced severe flooding, with major damage to rice crops. Farther east, floodwaters inundated streets in the outskirts of New Orleans, necessitating the use of skiffs for navigation. Four coal barges carrying cargo collectively valued at $12,000 sank in the Mississippi River near New Orleans.

=== Tropical Storm Five ===
- Tropical storm (SSHWS)
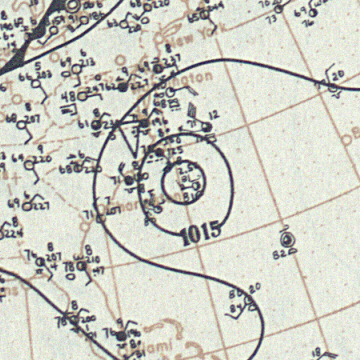
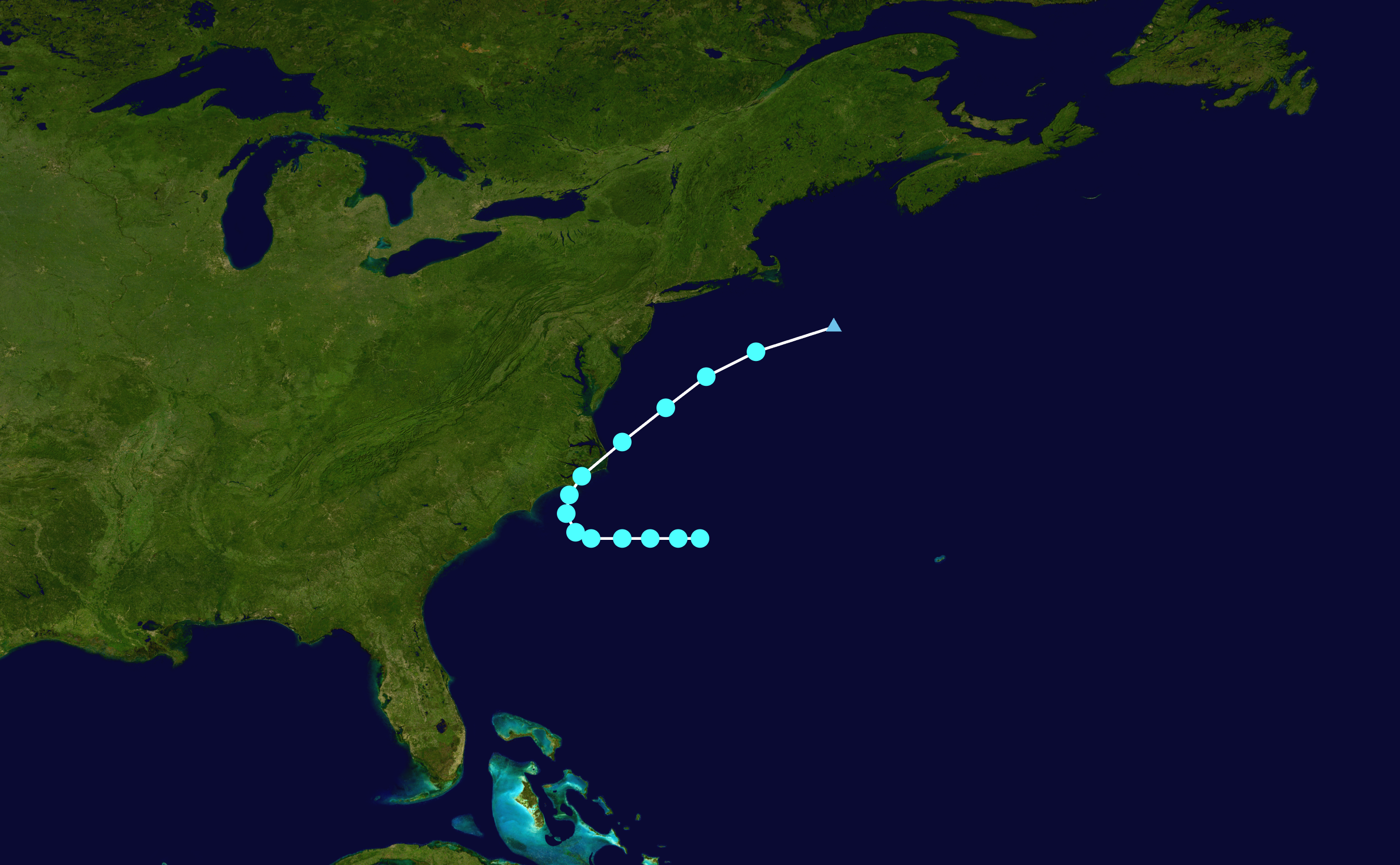
- Duration: August 30 – September 2
- Peak intensity: 50 mph (85 km/h) (1-min);

A ship detected a tropical storm about 230 mi (370 km) southeast of Cape Hatteras, North Carolina, at 12:00 UTC on August 30. The storm moved westward, until turning northeastward late on August 31. At 00:00 UTC on September 1, the system peaked with maximum sustained winds of 50 mph (80 km/h). Eight hours later, it made landfall near Cape Lookout, North Carolina, at the same intensity. Shortly thereafter, the storm reemerged into the Atlantic Ocean. The system transitioned into an extratropical cyclone at 18:00 UTC on September 2, while located about 135 mi (215 km) southeast of Nantucket, Massachusetts. The storm brought strong winds to portions of North Carolina and Virginia.

=== Hurricane Six ===
- Category 3 hurricane (SSHWS)
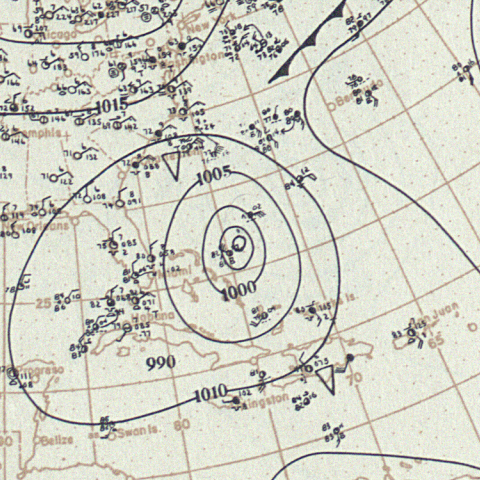
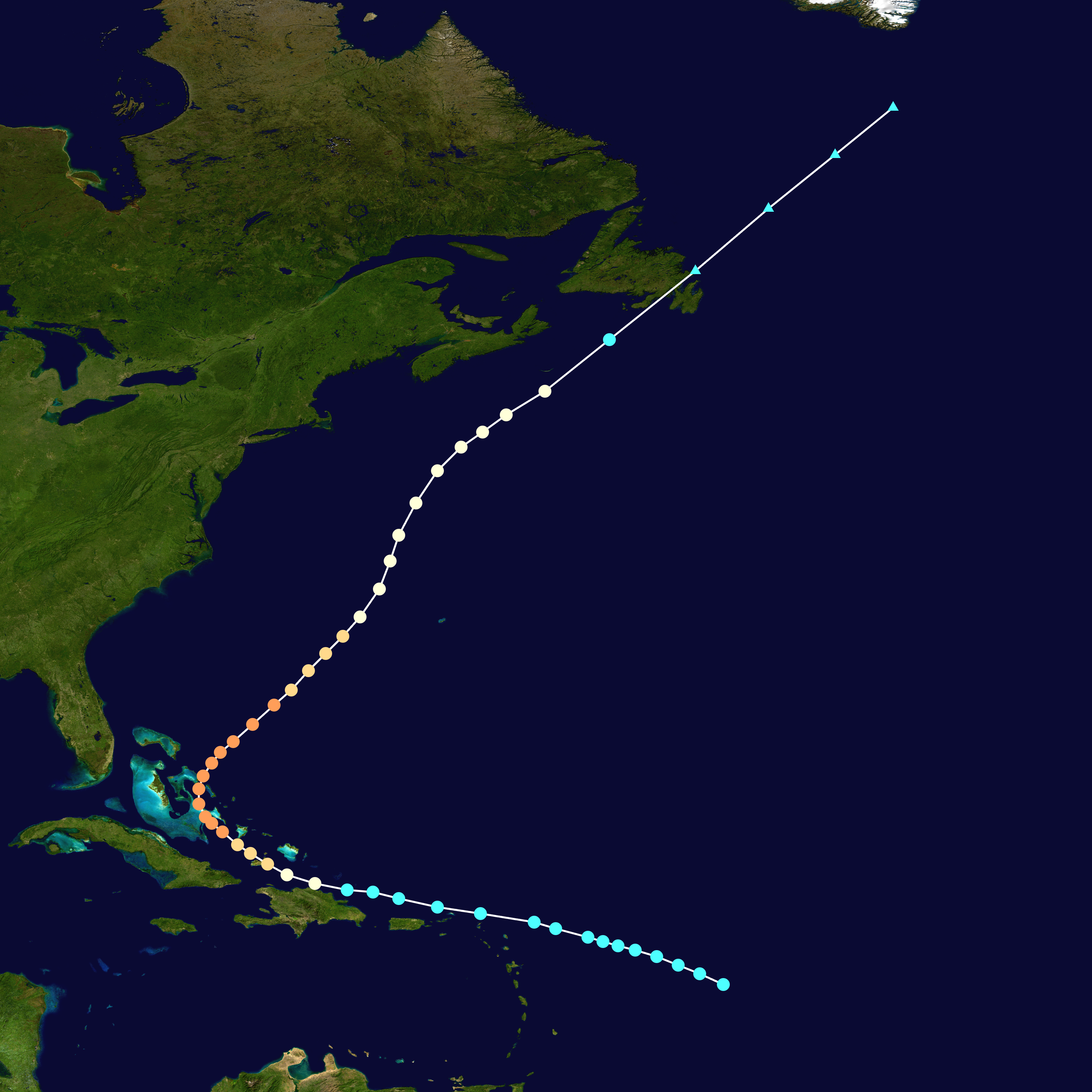
- Duration: September 7 – September 18
- Peak intensity: 120 mph (195 km/h) (1-min);

Historical weather maps indicate the presence of a tropical storm about 535 mi (860 km) east-northeast of Barbados on September 7. Moving west-northwestward, the storm passed just north of the Lesser Antilles and slowly intensified, becoming a hurricane just offshore the Dominican Republic early on September 11. Thereafter, the cyclone strengthened more quickly, becoming a Category 2 hurricane just prior to striking Inagua in the Bahamas several hours later with winds of 100 mph (160 km/h). Around 12:00 UTC on September 12, the system strengthened into a Category 3 hurricane and peaked with maximum sustained winds of 120 mph (190 km/h) by early the following day. The storm curved northward and passed over or near several islands on September 13 and September 14, including Exuma, Cat Island, and Eleuthera. Later on September 14, the cyclone turned northeastward and exited the island chain. While traversing the open Atlantic, the system slowly weakened and remained a hurricane until falling to tropical storm intensity late on September 18 while just offshore Newfoundland. The storm soon struck the island and became extratropical near Port Rexton. The extratropical remnants continued northeastward and dissipated over the Labrador Sea late the following day.

The passing storm brought high winds and rough surf to the northern coast of Puerto Rico between September 9–10. Winds topped out at 40 mph (64 km/h) in San Juan on July 10. In the Turks and Caicos Islands, wind gusts near 100 mph (160 km/h) uprooted many trees and partially destroyed many buildings and homes on Grand Turk Island. The Haitian sloop Telegraph capsized at Hawk's Nest with the loss of all occupants. Overall, the storm killed at least 19 people in the island chain. In the Bahamas, significant damage was reported on Acklins, Crooked Island, Inagua, Long Cay, Long Island, Rum Cay, and San Salvador Island. In Clarence Town, which is located on Long Island, the storm completely destroyed the churches, courthouse, and jail, as well as 97 percent of homes, leaving only five dwellings standing. On Inagua, the crew of the steamer Sibiria observed many wood-frame homes being destroyed in Matthew Town. The schooner Beulah McCabe sank in the vicinity of the Bahamas, causing the deaths of seven people. Wind gusts ranging from 50–60 mph (80–97 km/h) impacted Bermuda, though damage was mainly limited to some uprooted trees. In Atlantic Canada, some boats along the south coast of Nova Scotia suffered minor damage.

=== Tropical Storm Seven ===
- Tropical storm (SSHWS)
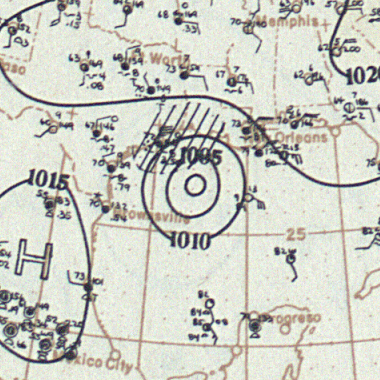
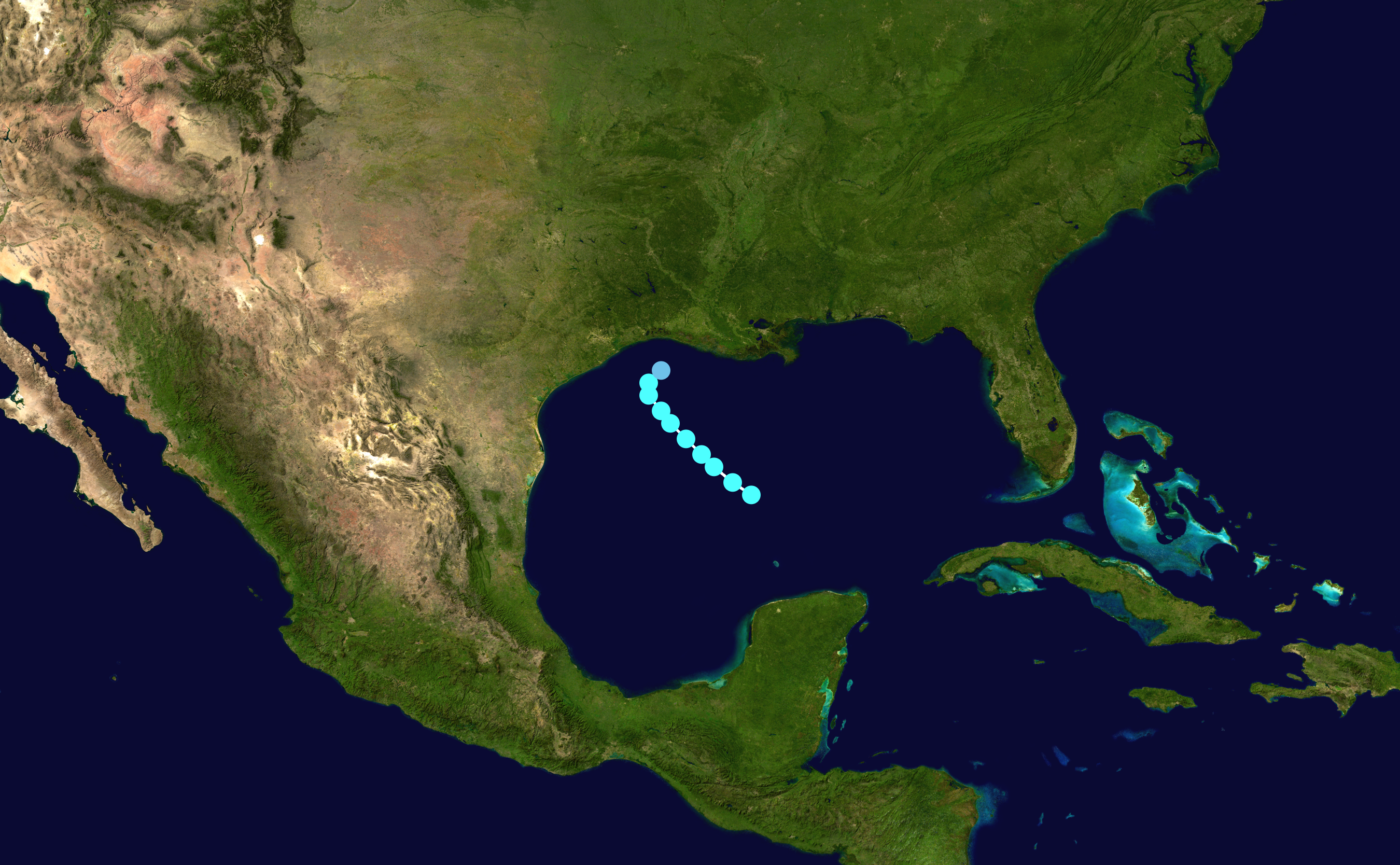
- Duration: September 16 – September 18
- Peak intensity: 70 mph (110 km/h) (1-min);

A ship first observed this tropical storm about 245 mi (395 km) north-northwest of Telchac Puerto, Yucatán, at 12:00 UTC on September 16. The storm intensified gradually while moving northwestward, peaking with maximum sustained winds of 70 mph (115 km/h) at 00:00 UTC on September 18. However, the cyclone soon quickly weakened, falling to tropical depression intensity about 18 hours later. It then dissipated about 70 mi (115 km) south-southwest of the Texas–Louisiana state line.

=== Hurricane Eight ===
- Category 2 hurricane (SSHWS)
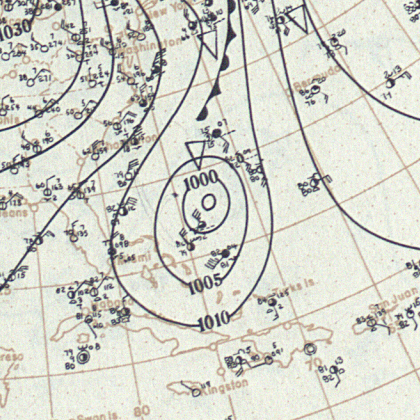
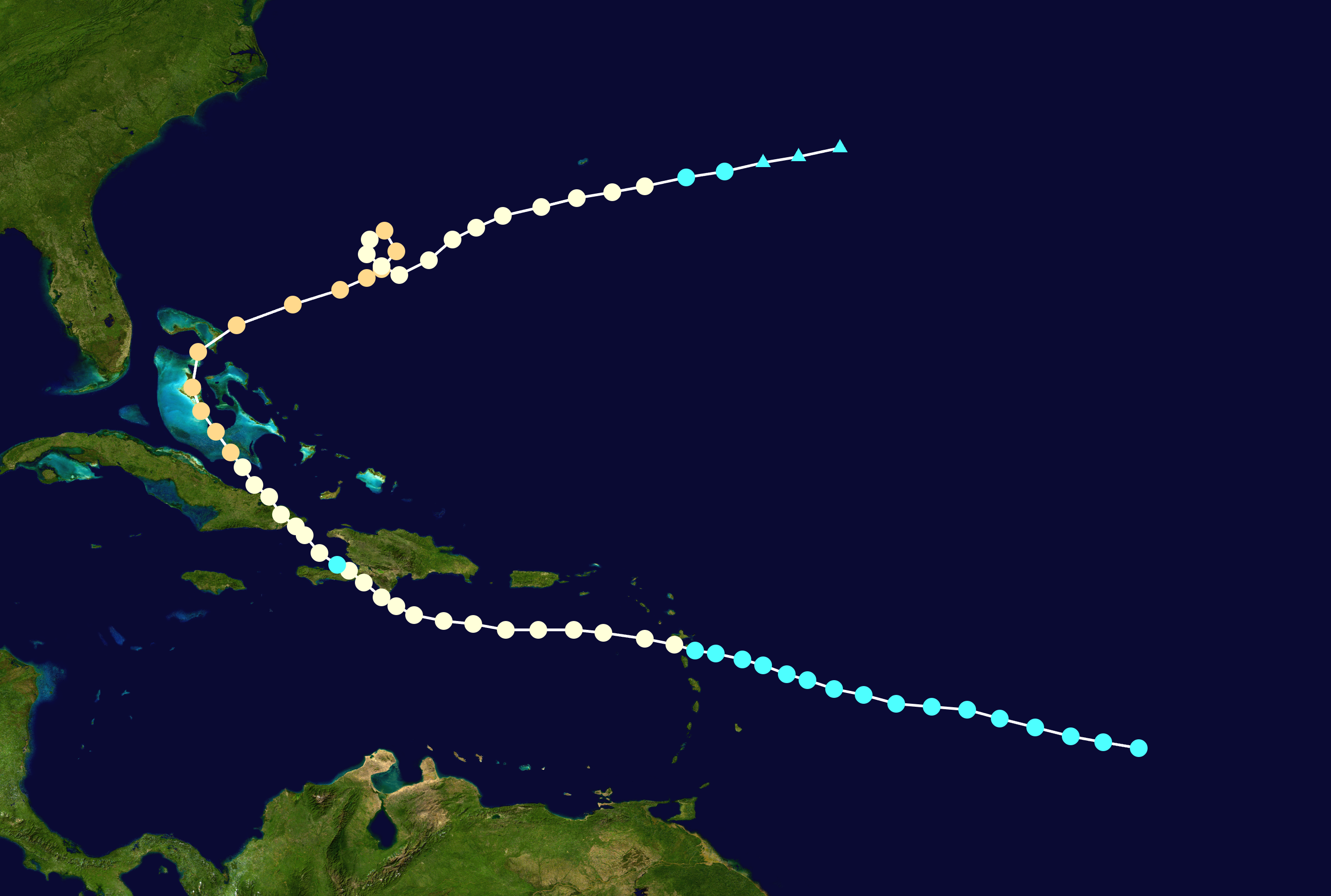
- Duration: September 21 – October 7
- Peak intensity: 110 mph (175 km/h) (1-min); <971 mbar (hPa)

A tropical storm was first detected on September 21 about 670 mi (1,080 km) northeast of French Guiana. The storm headed west-northwestward and slowly intensified, becoming a hurricane around the time it struck Guadeloupe on September 25. Entering the Caribbean Sea, the hurricane continued westward, until curving to the northwest while south of Hispaniola on September 27. Early the next day, the storm made landfall in Haiti near Marigot, Sud-Est, with winds of 80 mph (130 km/h). The system soon emerged over the Gulf of Gonâve, where it briefly weakened to a tropical storm late on September 28. Just after 12:00 UTC on September 29, the storm made another landfall near Imías, Guantánamo Province, Cuba, as a hurricane with winds of 85 mph (137 km/h). After the cyclone re-emerged into the Atlantic, it intensified while approaching the western Bahamas, becoming a Category 2 late on September 30. The hurricane peaked with maximum sustained winds of 110 mph (180 km/h) around the time it made landfall on Andros Island early the next day. The storm turned north-northeastward and then northeastward, causing it to strike the Abaco Islands before reaching the open Atlantic again late on October 1. The storm then executed a small cyclonic loop, before resuming an east-northeastward movement. By late on October 6, the system weakened to a tropical storm and transitioned into an extratropical cyclone about 350 mi (565 km) east of Bermuda. The extratropical remnants continued east-northeastward and dissipated several hours later.

On Guadeloupe, the storm uprooted many trees, severely damaged sugarcane crops, and deroofed sugar factories. Communications were also disrupted. The captain of the Dutch steamer Prins Willem V. reported considerable damage in Haiti. In Cuba, the hurricane destroyed several buildings, including the custom house, which was under construction. Many fruit groves suffered substantial damage. The storm produced hurricane-force winds and heavy precipitation over the western Bahamas. At Nassau, sustained winds reached 80 mph (130 km/h). Much of New Providence was inundated due to rainfall amounts up to 7 in (180 mm). Property damage was generally light, however, with only smaller dwellings and outbuildings being demolished. Several large vessels capsized in the vicinity of the island, resulting in six deaths. On the Abaco Islands, several buildings at a timber company's plant, one home, and several huts were destroyed. Eleuthera also reported extensive damage, including the destruction of a mission house, a chapel, and several other buildings. The storm toppled many coconut trees, while one plantation alone lost about 300 banana trees. Throughout the Bahamas, this storm, combined with the hurricane in mid-September, resulted in the near total loss of grapefruit, orange, and sisal crops. Additionally, the cyclone downed a number of trees and destroyed many gardens. Heavy rains and high winds also pelted Bermuda, damaging a number of structures.

=== Hurricane Nine ===
- Category 2 hurricane (SSHWS)
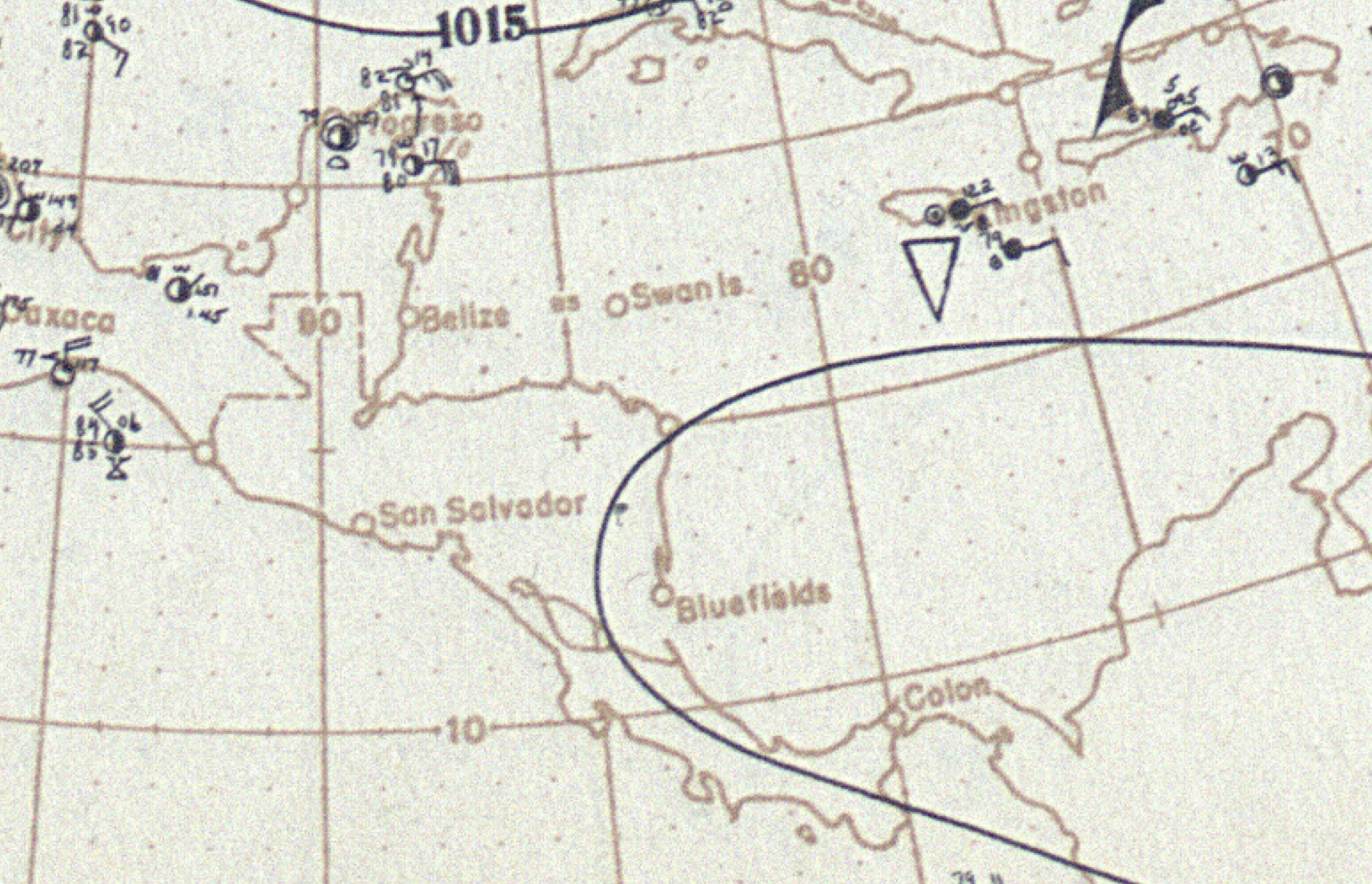
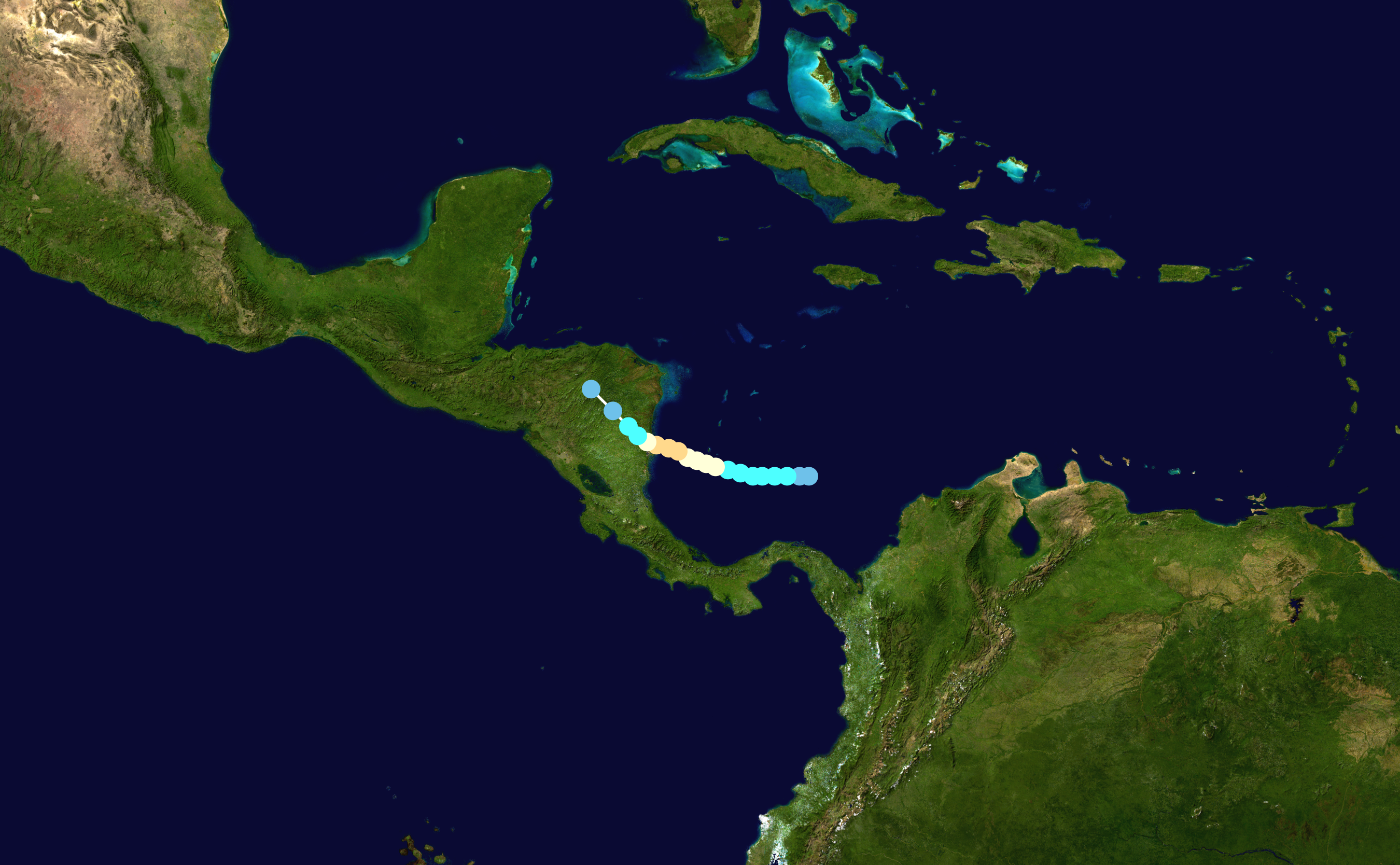
- Duration: October 14 – October 19
- Peak intensity: 105 mph (165 km/h) (1-min);

A ship indicated that a tropical depression developed about 160 mi (255 km) north-northeast of Nombre de Dios, Colón, on October 14 at 12:00 UTC. Moving westward, the depression became a tropical storm early the following day. The storm later curved to the west-northwest and intensified into a Category 1 hurricane around 12:00 UTC on October 16. About 24 hours later, it became a Category 2 hurricane. Late on October 17, the hurricane peaked with maximum sustained winds of 105 mph (170 km/h). Early the next day, it made landfall in Nicaragua near Pearl Lagoon, South Caribbean Coast Autonomous Region. The hurricane rapidly weakened after moving inland, falling to tropical storm intensity by 12:00 UTC on October 18 and weakening to a tropical depression at 00:00 UTC on October 19. Several hours later, the storm dissipated over Honduras.

The hurricane caused extensive impacts along the coast of Nicaragua from Cabo Gracias a Dios to Pearl Cays, with telegraph and telephone communications interrupted and railroads substantially damaged in that area. The towns of Prinzapolka and Rio Grande were completely destroyed. The New York Times reported "much loss of life," including at least two deaths in Rio Grande.

=== Tropical Storm Ten ===
- Tropical storm (SSHWS)
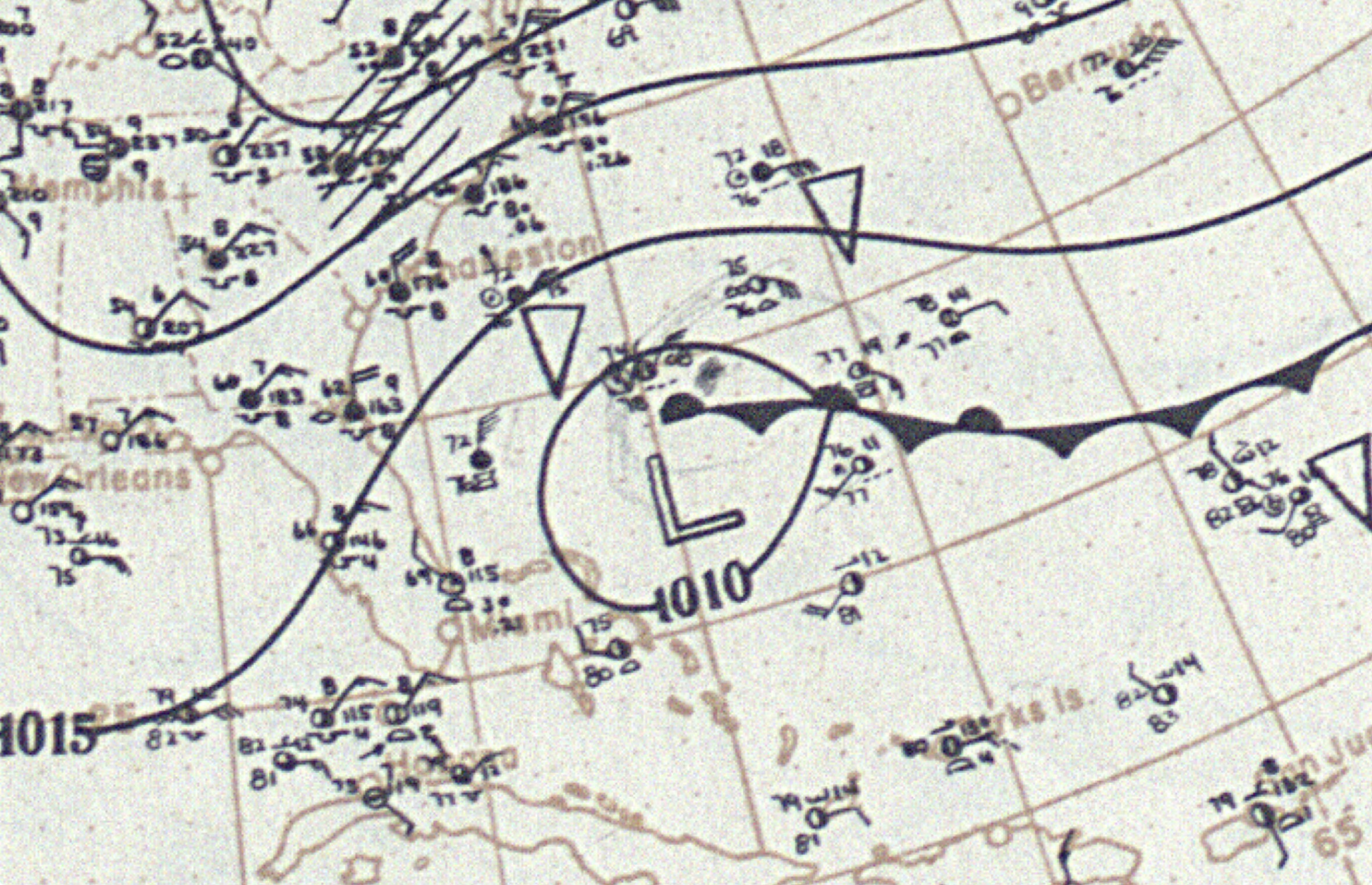
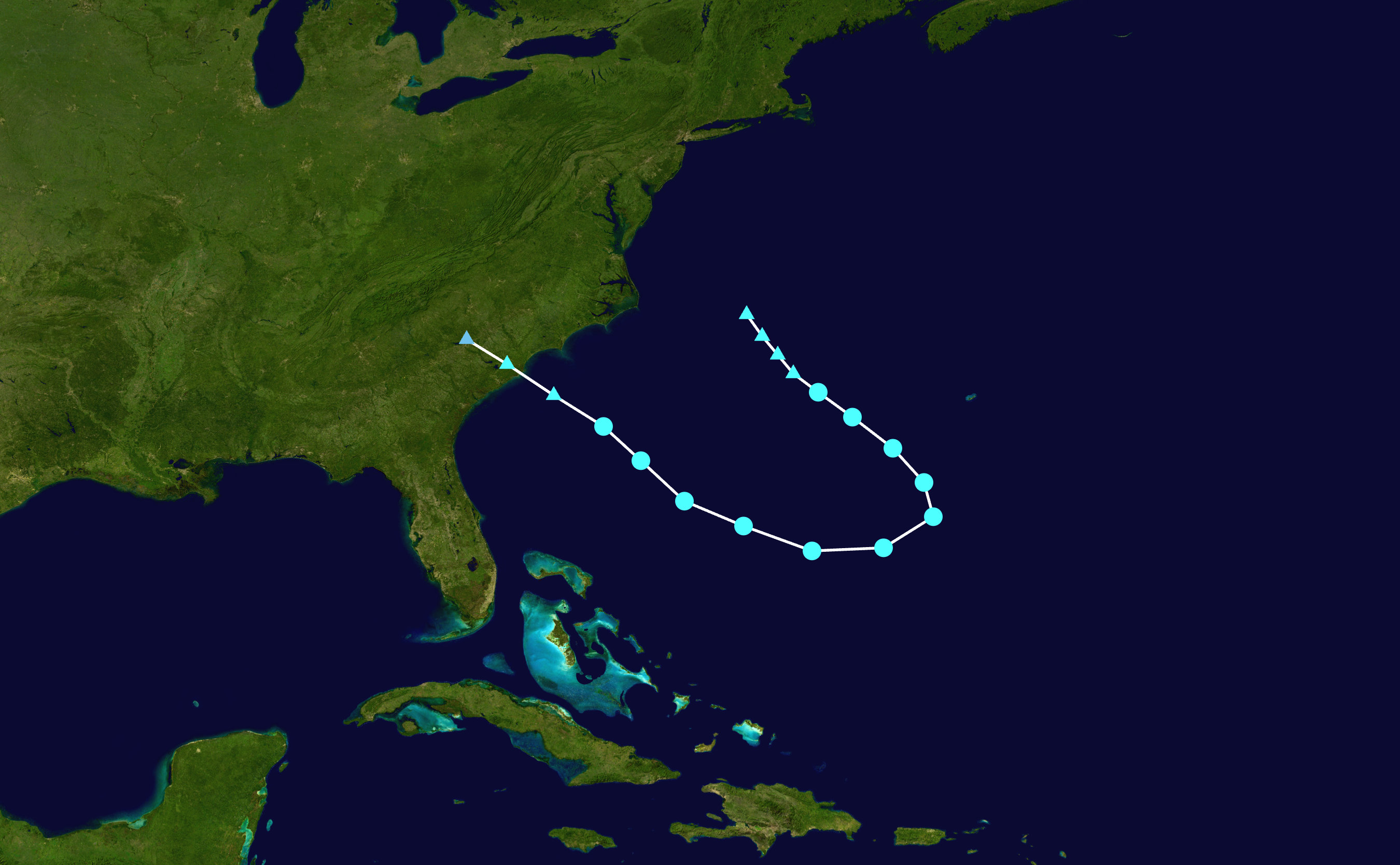
- Duration: October 20 – October 23
- Peak intensity: 40 mph (65 km/h) (1-min);

An extratropical low-pressure area became a tropical storm about 280 mi (450 km) west of Bermuda at 12:00 UTC on October 20. The cyclone moved southeastward and failed to strengthen beyond maximum sustained winds of 40 mph (64 km/h). Late on October 21, the storm curved southwestward and then northwestward early the next day. Due to colder sea surface temperatures, the system gradually lost tropical characteristics and transitioned into an extratropical cyclone about 100 mi (160 km) east-southeast of Charleston, South Carolina, early on October 23. The extratropical low moved ashore South Carolina near McClellanville before dissipating several hours later. Light rainfall was observed in South Carolina, with up to 2.86 in (73 mm) of precipitation recorded in Conway on October 23.

=== Other systems ===
In addition to the ten tropical cyclones reaching at least tropical storm intensity, three others remained tropical depressions. On August 3, a tropical depression formed about 360 mi (580 km) southeast of Bermuda. The depression moved northeastward and later southeastward, before dissipating on August 5. Another tropical depression developed on September 12 about 100 mi (160 km) west-northwest of Nouakchott, Mauritania. The depression moved southwestward and passed through the Cape Verde islands before dissipating on September 15. A trough developed into a tropical depression on September 21 about 600 mi (965 km) northeast of French Guiana. The depression moved east-northeastward and may have intensified into a tropical storm. However, the depression was last noted on the following day.

== See also ==
- 1900–1940 South Pacific cyclone seasons
- 1900–1950 South-West Indian Ocean cyclone seasons
- 1900s Australian region cyclone seasons
