= Cacocum =

- Municipality
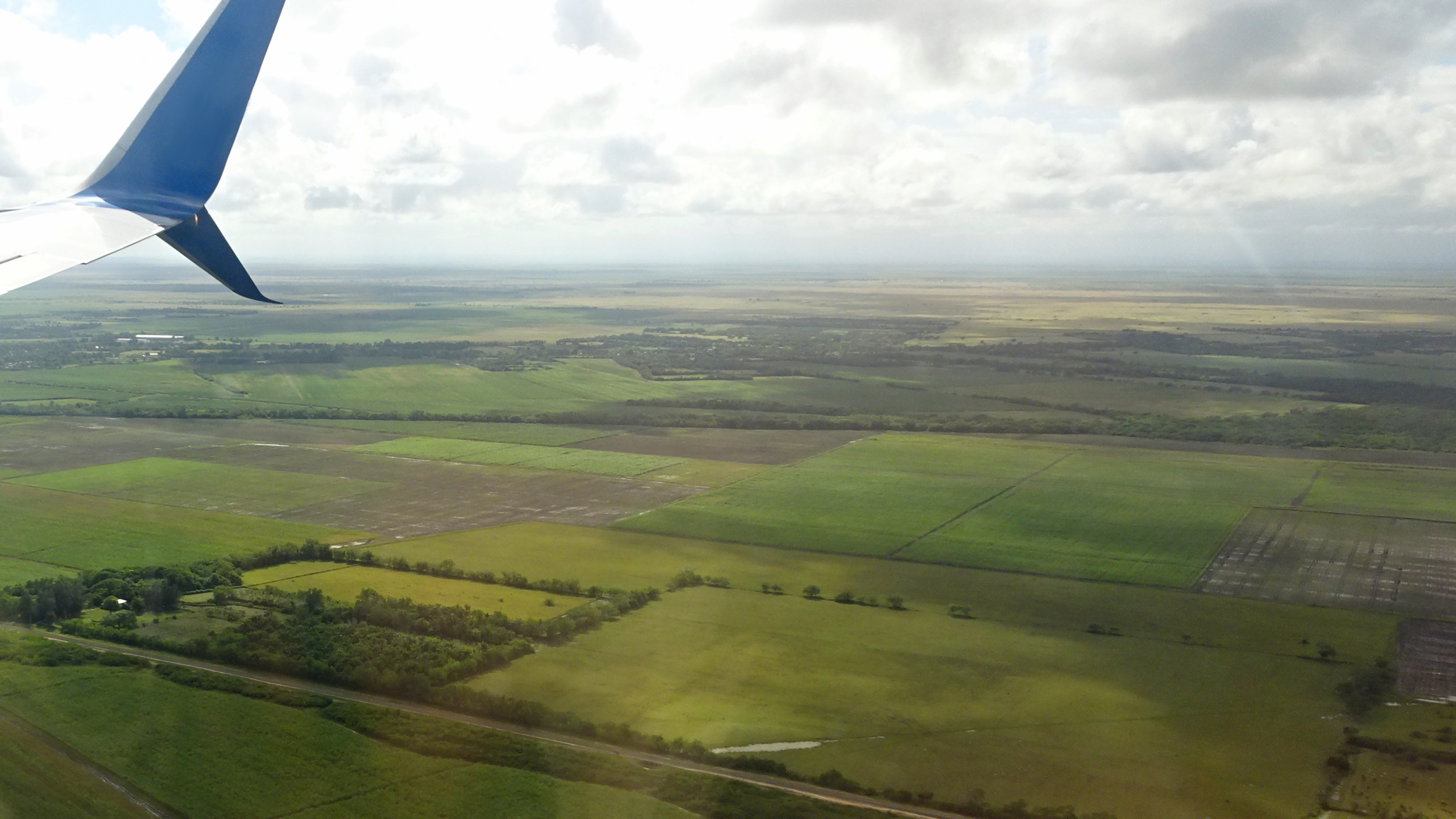
- Aerial view of Cacocum on approach to Frank País Airport

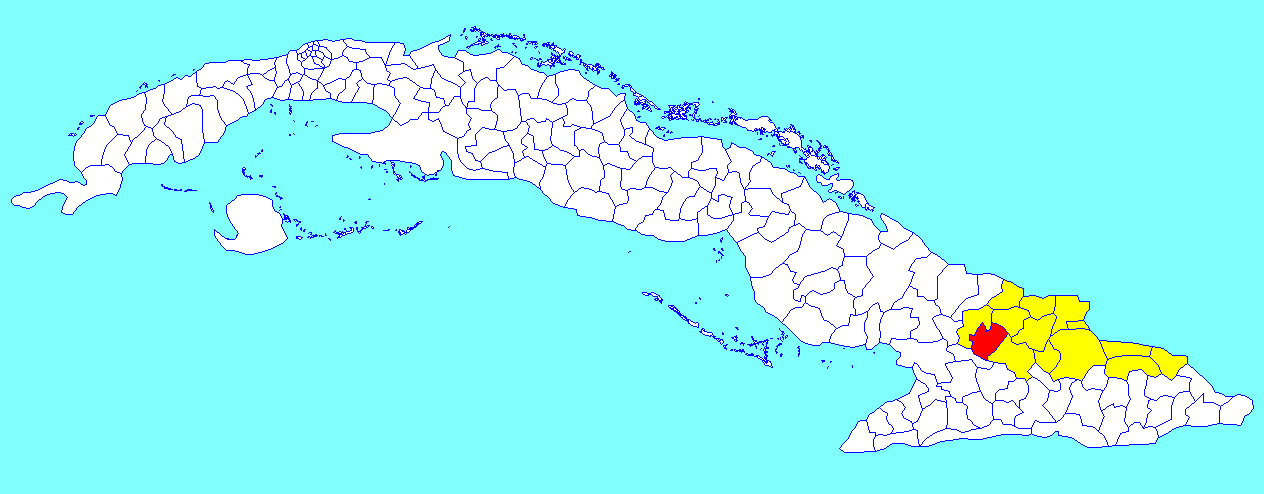
- Cacocum municipality (red) within Holguín Province (yellow) and Cuba
- Coordinates: 20°44′38″N 76°19′27″W
- Country: Cuba
- Province: Holguín

Government
  - President: Mariela Cruz Herrera

Area
  - Total: 661 km^{2} (255 sq mi)
- Elevation: 75 m (246 ft)

Population (2022)
  - Total: 39,153
  - Density: 59.2/km^{2} (153/sq mi)
- Time zone: UTC-5 (EST)
- Area code: +53-24

Cacocum is a municipality and town in the Holguín Province of Cuba.

== Overview ==
It is located south of the city of Holguín and east of the Frank País International Airport towards the city of Bayamo on the Carretera Central Highway. The area includes extremely flat ground stretching south to the municipality's boundaries with Granma Province. Its territory is bounded on the west by Las Tunas Province, and on the east with the Báguanos municipality, its nearest neighbor.

Carretera Central and the Central Railroad pass near the Cacocum townsite, the most populated settlement of this municipality. Two local sugar mills, called Antonio Maceo and Cristino Naranjo represent Cacocum's main economic activity.

== Demographics ==
In 2022, the municipality of Cacocum had a population of 39,153. With a total area of 661 km^{2} (255 sq mi), it has a population density of 59/km^{2} (150/sq mi).

== See also ==
- List of cities in Cuba
- Municipalities of Cuba
