= El Salvador, Cuba =

Municipality and town in Guantánamo, Cuba

El Salvador
- Municipality
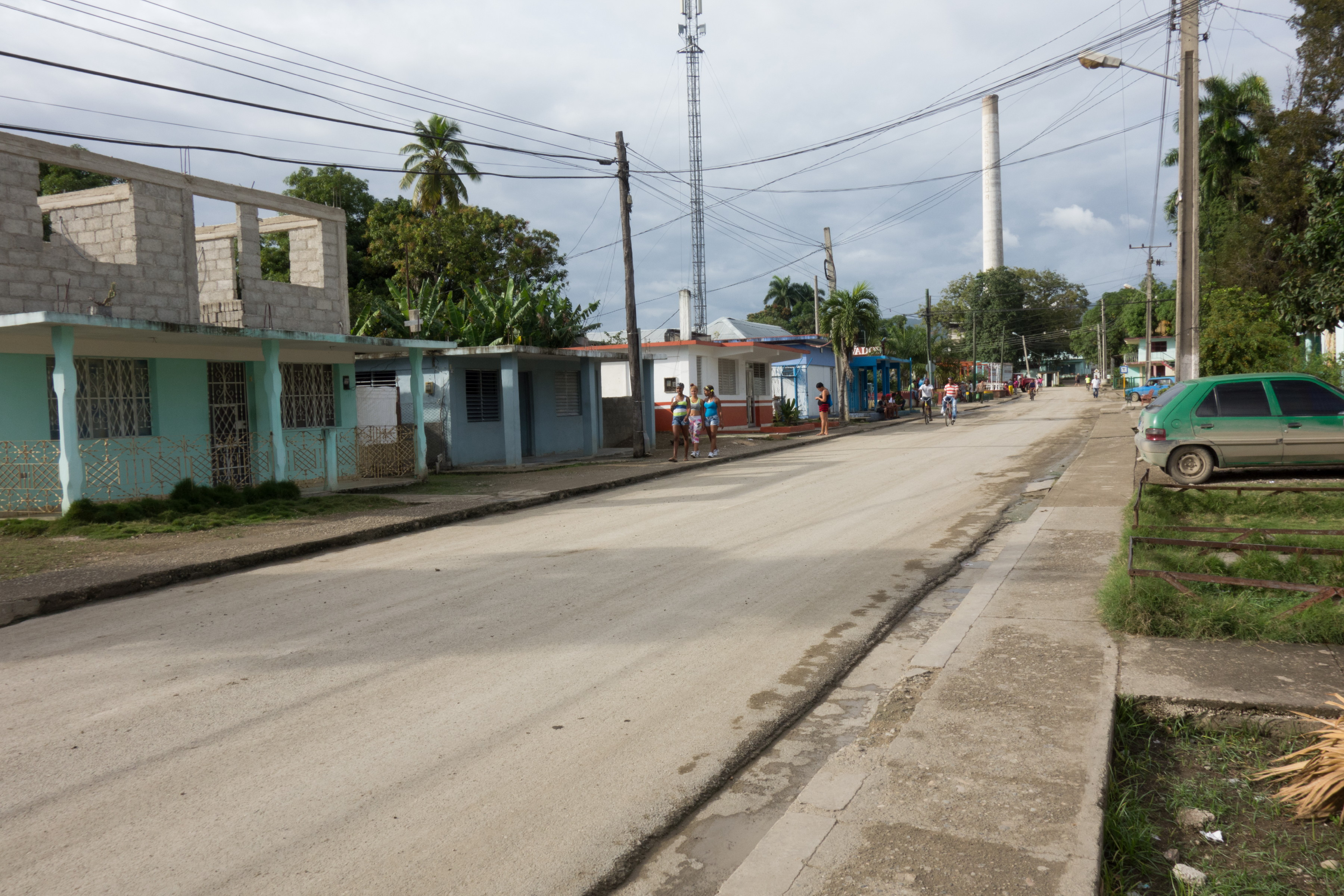

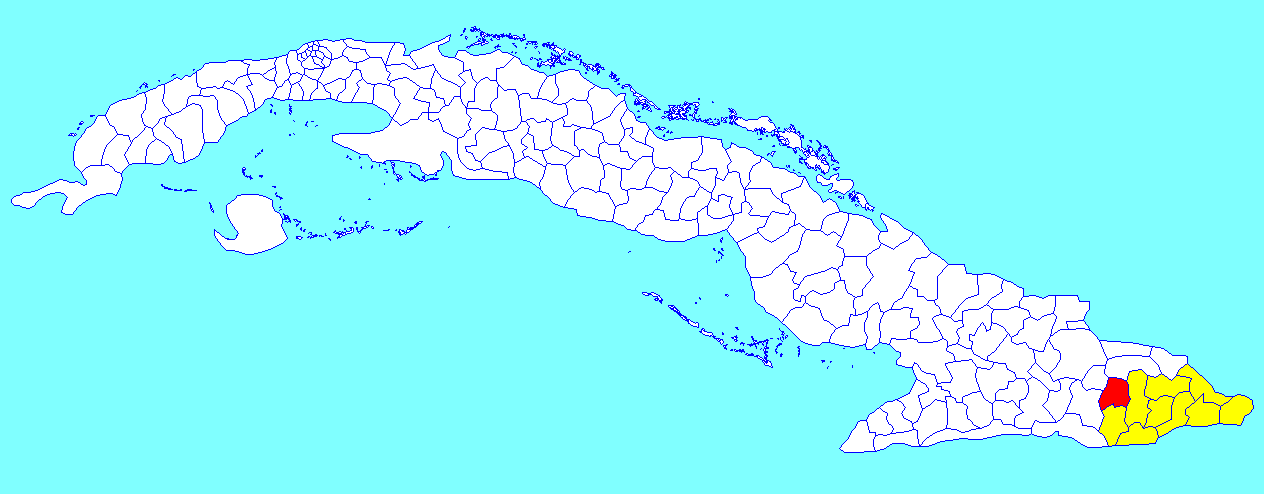
- El Salvador municipality (red) within Guantánamo Province (yellow) and Cuba
- Coordinates: 20°12′34″N 75°13′23″W
- Country: Cuba
- Province: Guantánamo

Area
  - Municipality: 637 km^{2} (246 sq mi)
- Elevation: 85 m (279 ft)

Population (2022)
  - Municipality: 41,420
  - Density: 65.0/km^{2} (168/sq mi)
  - Urban: 9,087
  - Rural: 32,333
- Time zone: UTC-5 (EST)
- Area code: +53-21
- Website: https://www.elsalvador.gob.cu/es/

El Salvador is a municipality and town in the Guantánamo Province of Cuba. It is located immediately north of the provincial capital, Guantánamo.

== Demographics ==
In 2022, the municipality of El Salvador had a population of 41,420. With a total area of 637 km^{2} (246 sq mi), it has a population density of 65/km^{2} (170/sq mi). The urban population was 9,087.

== See also ==
- List of cities in Cuba
- Municipalities of Cuba
