= Imías =

- Municipality
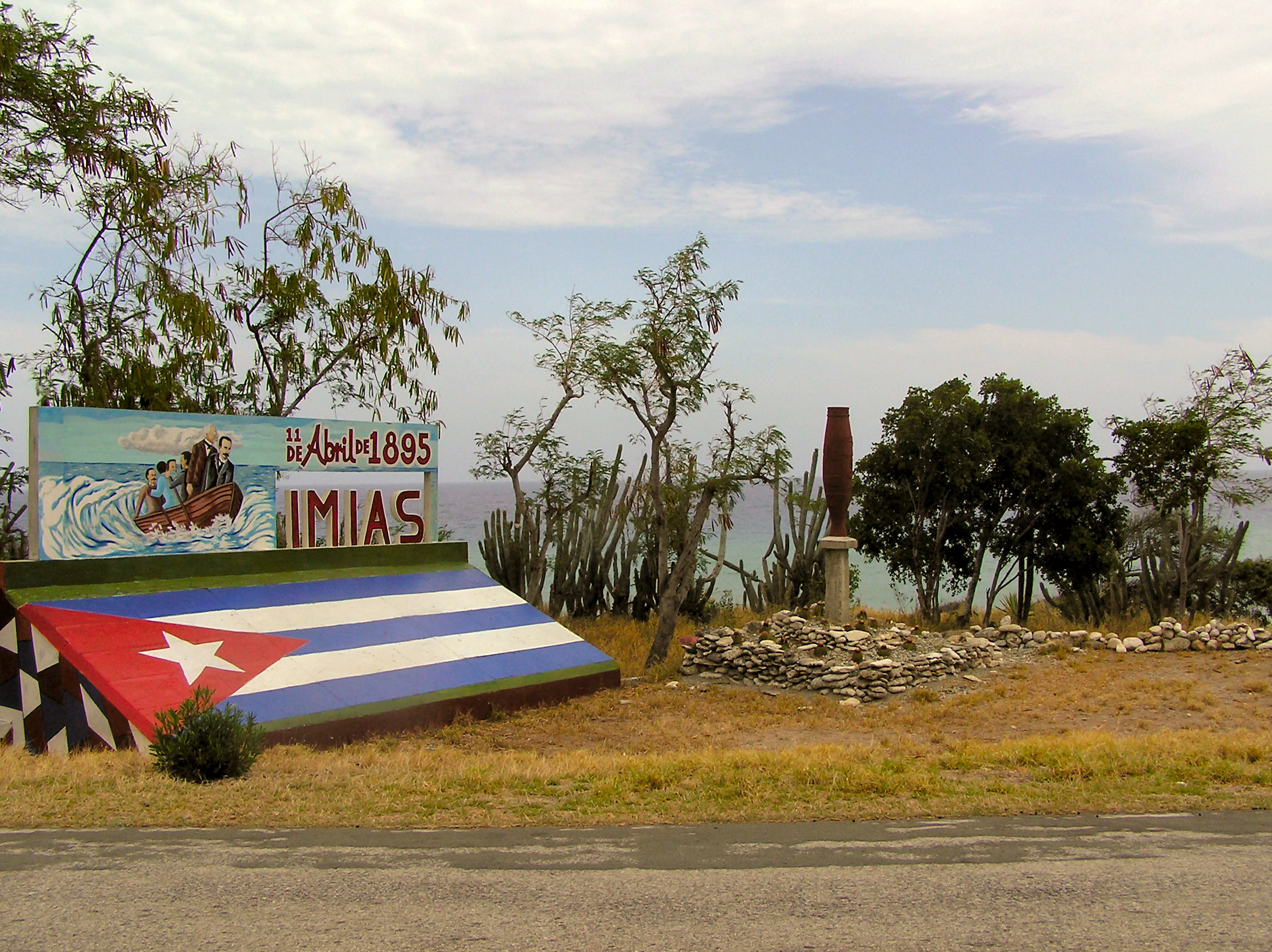
- Memorial of José Martí landing of 11 April 1895

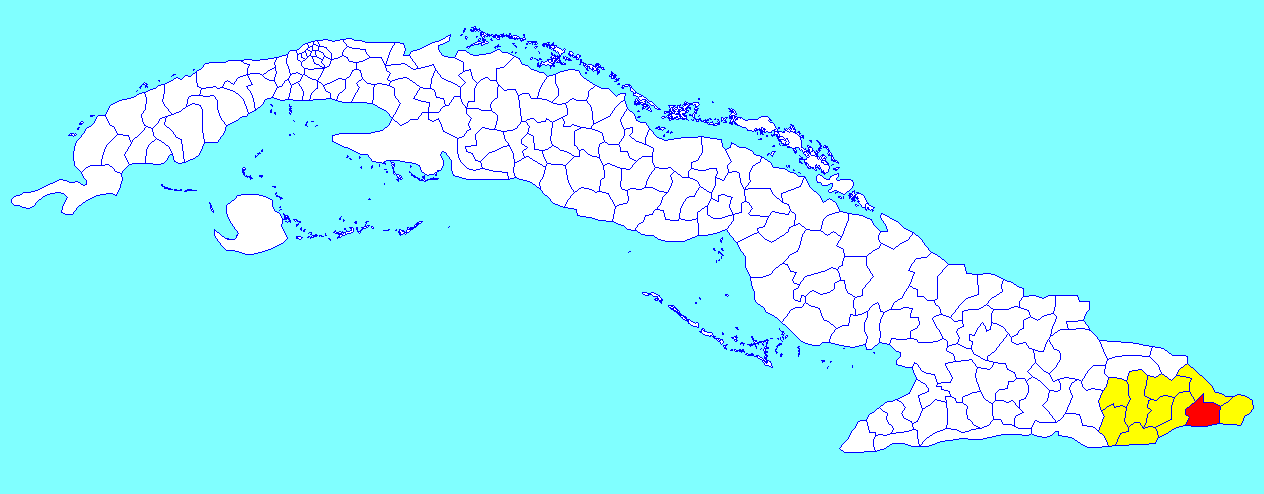
- Imías municipality (red) within Guantánamo Province (yellow) and Cuba
- Coordinates: 20°04′36″N 74°39′7″W
- Country: Cuba
- Province: Guantánamo

Area
  - Total: 524 km^{2} (202 sq mi)
- Elevation: 30 m (98 ft)

Population (2022)
  - Total: 21,005
  - Density: 40.1/km^{2} (104/sq mi)
- Time zone: UTC-5 (EST)
- Area code: +53-21
- Website: https://www.imias.gob.cu/es/

Imías is a municipality and town in the Guantánamo Province of Cuba. It is located on the southern coast of Cuba, bordering the Caribbean Sea to the south.

== Geography ==
The municipality of Imías borders with San Antonio del Sur, Baracoa and Maisí. The town is crossed by the Carretera Central, a west–east highway spanning the length of Cuba, and counts a little airport.

== Demographics ==
In 2022, the municipality of Imías had a population of 21,005. With a total area of 524 km^{2} (202 sq mi), it has a population density of 40.0/km^{2} (104/sq mi).

== See also ==
- Municipalities of Cuba
- List of cities in Cuba
