= La Farola =

Copper mining project in Chile

La Farola mine
- Location within Atacama Region Location within Chile
- Location: Tierra Amarilla, Atacama Region, Chile; 27°35′40″S 70°21′09″W
- Products: Copper, gold
- Company: Minera Altair

La Farola is a copper and gold mining project in Chile's Atacama Region. The project is located in the commune of Tierra Amarilla 25 km south of the regional capital Copiapó and about 11 km southwest of Candelaria mine. The project is located in the basin of Copiapó River near the headwaters of one of its tributaries in an area that is arid and mountainous. It is expected to become a new major source of employment in the region with 1,200 jobs associated to its construction and 600 to its operation. Most empoyment will be local. After failing twice to obtain a favourable approval of its environmental impact assessment in 2023 it was approved in April 2025. The mine is planned to be of open-pit type and the produce leaving the mine area will be ore concentrate. The mine's ancillary facilities are designed to be able to process up to 15,000 tons of ore per day.

Despite being in an inland location the mine is planned to operate using desalinated water from the ocean. The mine plans to dispose its tailings using a dry tailings technique.

The indigenous Qulla community Tata Inti, based in Pueblo de Los Loros, has objected to the approval of the environmental aspects of the project in addition to claiming there was an improper consultation of with indigenous peoples. As of April 2026 the case is under consideration in the First Environmental Court of Chile.
