= Manuel Tames =

- Municipality
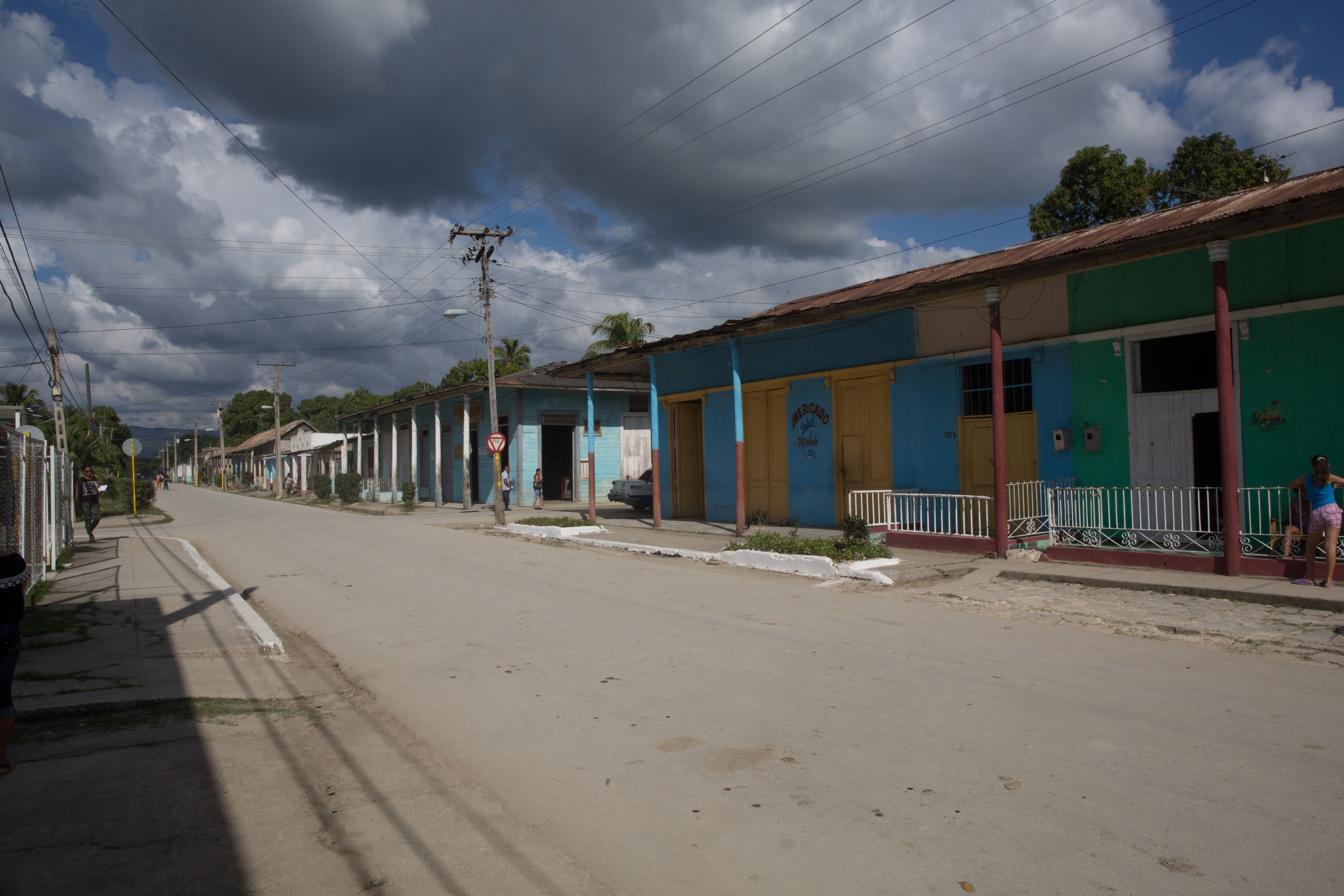
- Jamaica

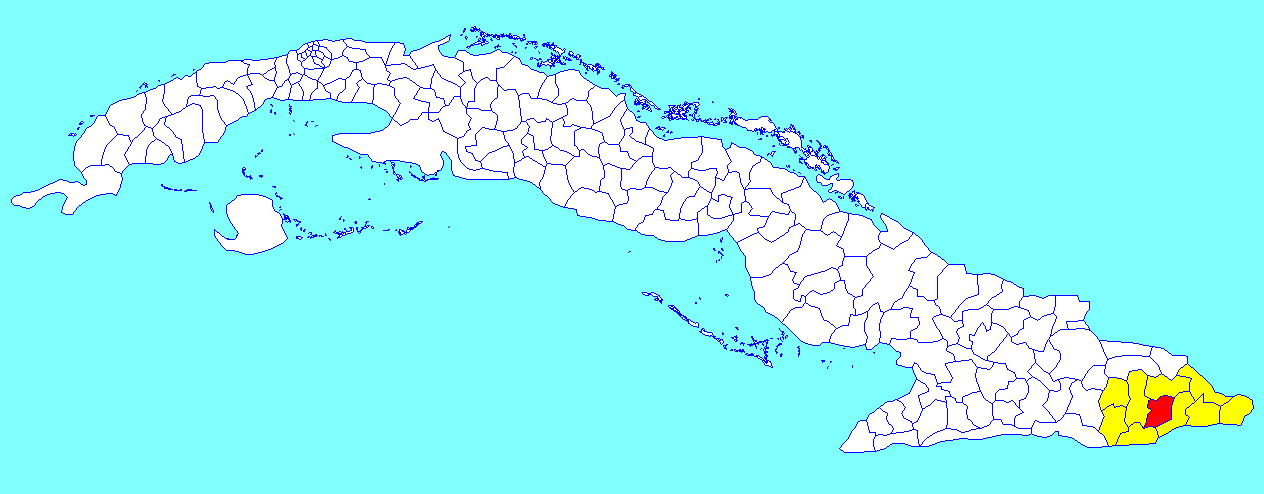
- Manuel Tames municipality (red) within Guantánamo Province (yellow) and Cuba
- Coordinates: 20°10′49″N 75°03′5″W
- Country: Cuba
- Province: Guantánamo
- Seat: Jamaica

Area
  - Total: 526 km^{2} (203 sq mi)
- Elevation: 175 m (574 ft)

Population (2022)
  - Total: 36,067
  - Density: 68.6/km^{2} (178/sq mi)
- Time zone: UTC-5 (EST)
- Area code: +53-21
- Website: https://www.manueltames.gob.cu/

Manuel Tames is a municipality and town in the Guantánamo Province of Cuba. Its administrative seat is located in the town of Jamaica.

== Geography ==
The town is located 15 kilometres (9.3 mi) east of the provincial capital, Guantánamo.

== Demographics ==
In 2022, the municipality of Manuel Tames had a population of 36,067. With a total area of 526 km^{2} (203 sq mi), it has a population density of 69/km^{2} (180/sq mi). The urban population was 19,790.

== See also ==
- List of cities in Cuba
- Municipalities of Cuba
