= Guantánamo Province =

Province of Cuba

Province of Guantanamo Provincia de Guantánamo
- Province
- Location in Cuba

- Coat of arms
- Interactive map of Province of Guantanamo
- Country: Cuba
- Capital: Guantánamo

Area
  - Total: 6,164.47 km^{2} (2,380.12 sq mi)

Population (2021)
  - Total: 533,839
  - Density: 86.5993/km^{2} (224.291/sq mi)
- Time zone: UTC−5 (EST)
- HDI (2019): 0.788 high · 6th of 16
- Website: https://www.guantanamo.gob.cu/es/

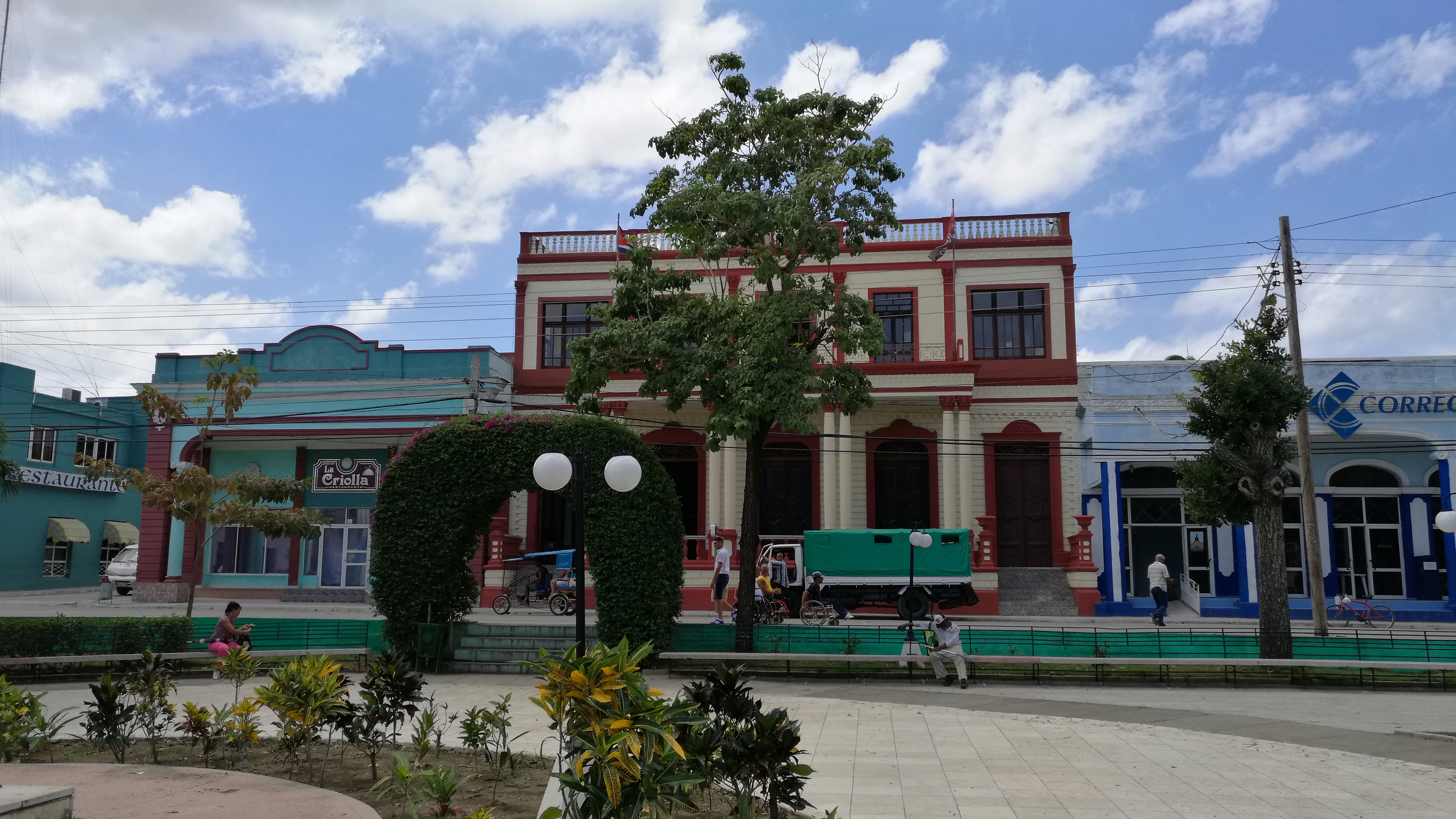
Casa de la Cultura

Guantánamo is the easternmost province of Cuba. Its capital is also called Guantánamo. Other towns include Baracoa. The province has the only land border of the United States Navy base at Guantánamo Bay.

== Overview ==
Guantánamo's architecture and culture is unlike the rest of Cuba. The province is only 80 kilometres (50 mi) away from Haiti at its closest point, across the Windward Passage (close enough to see lights on Haiti on a clear night). Guantánamo also has a high number of immigrants from Jamaica. Many buildings are comparable to those of the French Quarter of New Orleans in the United States state of Louisiana.

The Nipe-Sagua-Baracoa mountains dominate the province, dividing both climate and landscape. The northern coast, battered by prevailing winds, is the wettest part of the country, while the south, sheltered and dry, is the hottest. The north is characterized by rainforests, while the south is arid and has many cacti.

== Municipalities ==
1. Baracoa
2. Caimanera
3. El Salvador
4. Guantánamo
5. Imías
6. Maisí (La Máquina)
7. Manuel Tames
8. Niceto Pérez
9. San Antonio del Sur
10. Yateras (Palenque)

== See also ==
- Guantanamera
- Parque Nacional Alejandro de Humboldt
