= San Antonio del Sur =

- Municipality
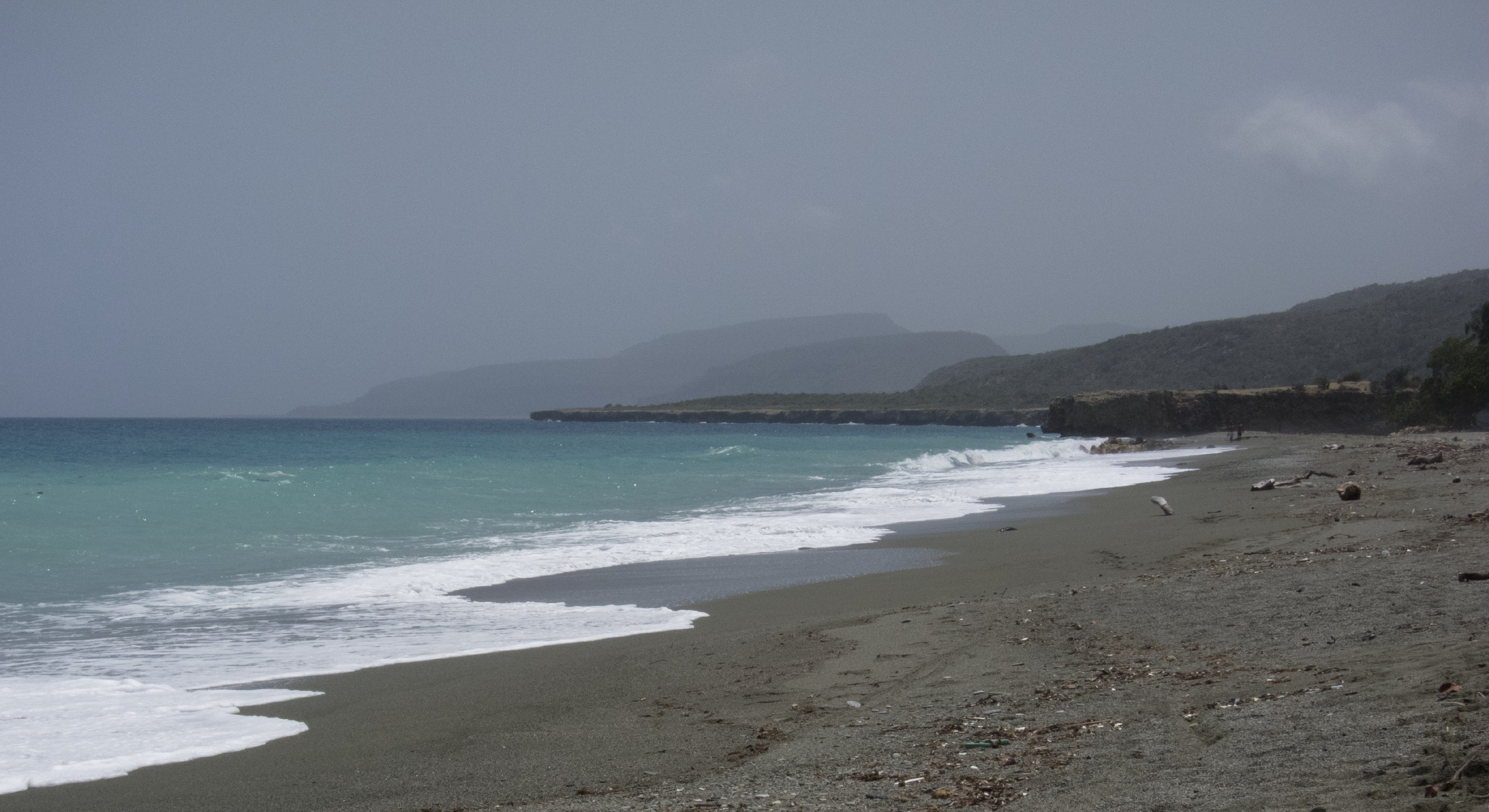
- The beach Sabanalamar near San Antonio del Sur

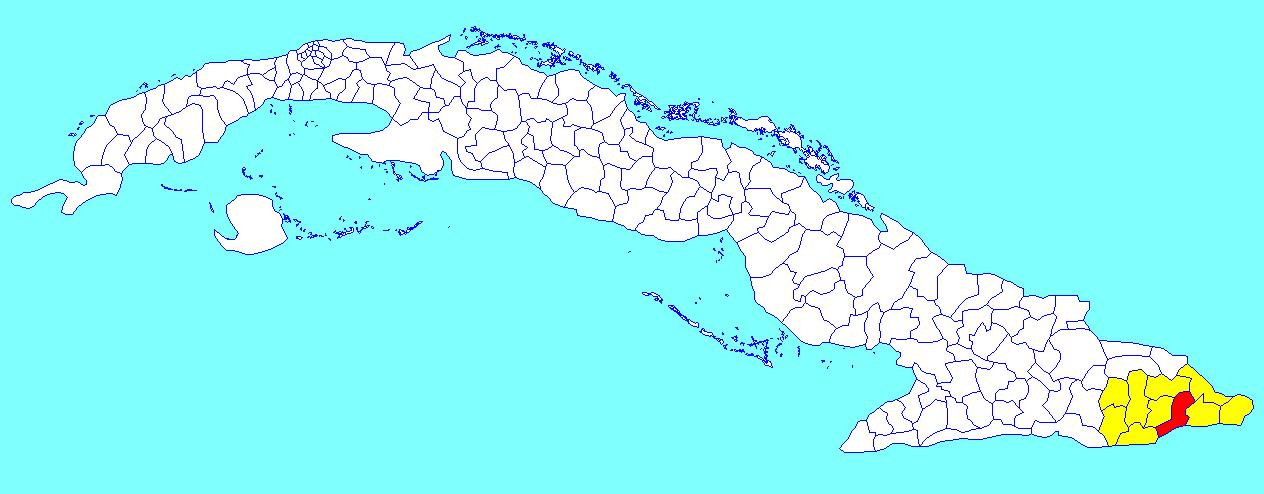
- San Antonio del Sur municipality (red) within Guantánamo Province (yellow) and Cuba
- Coordinates: 20°03′25″N 74°48′28″W
- Country: Cuba
- Province: Guantánamo

Area
  - Total: 585 km^{2} (226 sq mi)
- Elevation: 5 m (16 ft)

Population (2022)
  - Total: 25,752
  - Density: 44.0/km^{2} (114/sq mi)
- Time zone: UTC-5 (EST)
- Area code: +53-21
- Website: https://sanantonio.gob.cu/es/

San Antonio del Sur is a municipality and town in the Guantánamo Province of Cuba. It is located on the southern coast of Cuba, bordering the Windward Passage to the south.

== Demographics ==
In 2022, the municipality of San Antonio del Sur had a population of 25,752. With a total area of 585 km^{2} (226 sq mi), it has a population density of 44/km^{2} (110/sq mi).

== See also ==
- List of cities in Cuba
- Municipalities of Cuba
