= Preston Airport =

Defunct airport in Cuba

- IATA: ~~PST~~; ICAO: none

Summary
- Airport type: Defunct
- Serves: Guatemala, Holguín Province, Cuba
- Elevation AMSL: 8 m (26 ft)
- Coordinates: 20°44′03″N 075°39′26″W

Map
- Location in Cuba

Runways
Direction	Length		Surface
Direction	m	ft	Surface
07/25	1,800	5,906	Asphalt
- Sources: GCM, ASN, STV

Preston Airport (IATA: ~~PST~~) was an airport serving Guatemala, a village of the municipality of Mayarí in the Holguín Province of Cuba.
