= Guatemala, Cuba =

Guatemala Preston
- Village
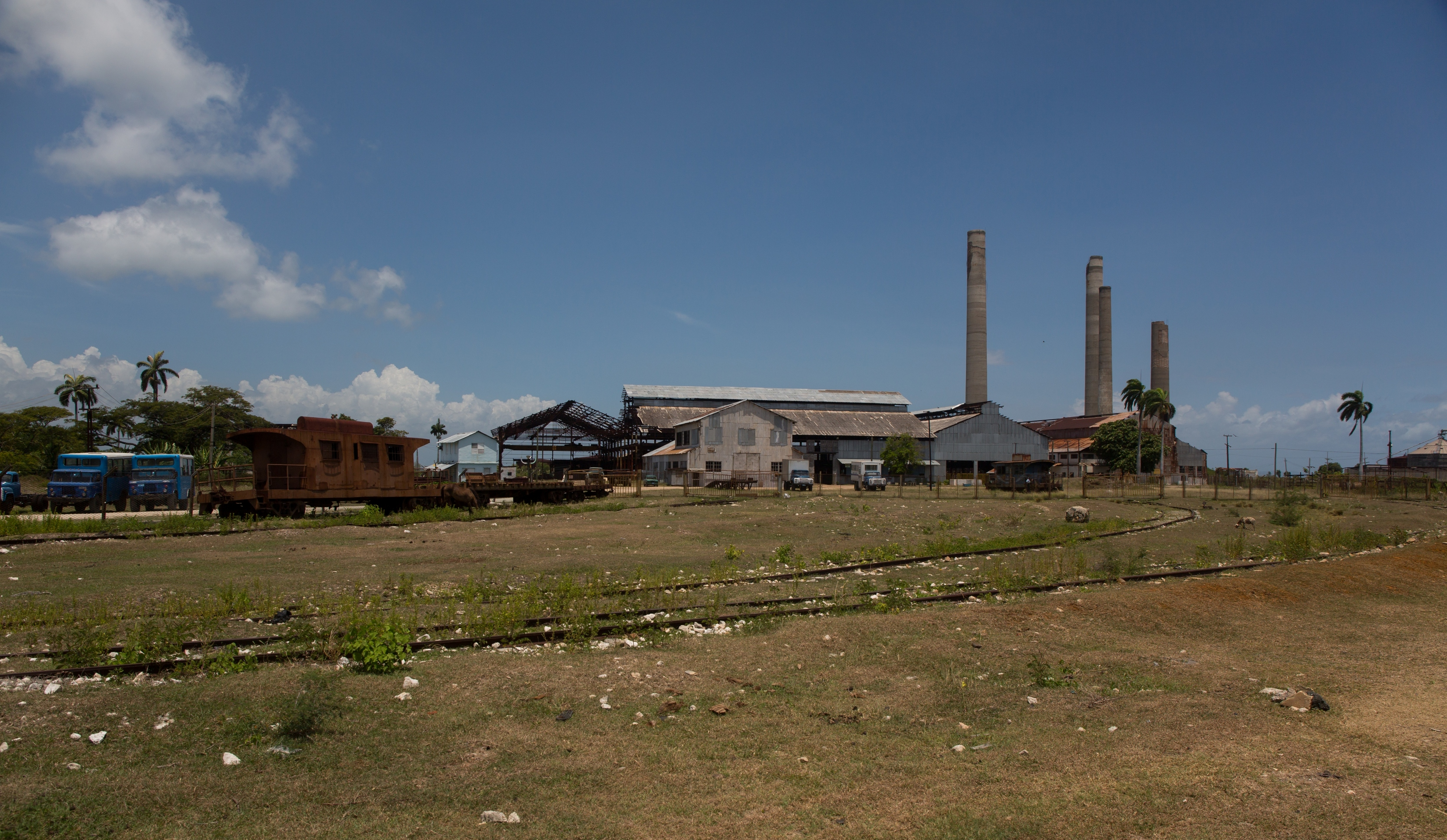
- Guatemala, old central sugar refinery

- Location of Guatemala in Cuba
- Coordinates: 20°45′12″N 075°39′02″W
- Country: Cuba
- Province: Holguín
- Municipality: Mayarí
- Elevation: 8 m (26 ft)
- Time zone: UTC-5 (EST)
- Area code: +53-24

Guatemala, also known as Preston, is a Cuban village and consejo popular ("people's council", i.e. hamlet) of the municipality of Mayarí, in Holguín Province.

== History ==
In the first half of the 20th century, the village was a sugar cane processing center owned and operated by the United Fruit Company and named in honor of one of the company's founders, Andrew W. Preston. In the Caribbean, processing centers for cane sugar are referred to by the Spanish term "central". Following the Cuban Revolution of 1958, United Fruit was forced to withdraw and the Cuban government renamed the town Guatemala to symbolize solidarity with the Central American nation. Due to decades of neglect and failure to modernize the mill - not to mention declining global prices for sugar - the mill/central was closed around 1990 and the village went into decline.

== Geography ==
The village is located in Nipe Bay, 14 km north of Mayarí. It is 27 km from Nicaro-Levisa, 34 from Cayo Saetía, and 98 from Holguín.

== Transportation ==
Guatemala was served by the Preston Airport (IATA: PST).

== See also ==
- Birán
- Municipalities of Cuba
- List of cities in Cuba
