= Juanita Castro =

Cuban dissident (1933–2023)

- Portrait of Castro
- Born: Juana de la Caridad Castro Ruz; 6 May 1933; Birán, Oriente, Republic of Cuba
- Died: 4 December 2023 (aged 90); Miami, Florida, U.S.
- Citizenship: Cuba; United States (from 1984)
- Occupations: Activist; writer
- Parents: Ángel Castro y Argiz (father); Lina Ruz González (mother)
- Relatives: Ramón Castro Ruz (brother); Fidel Castro (brother); Raúl Castro (brother); Fidel Castro Díaz-Balart (nephew); Alina Fernández (niece); Mariela Castro (niece); Alejandro Castro Espín (nephew); Raúl Guillermo Rodríguez Castro (great nephew)

Juana de la Caridad "Juanita" Castro Ruz (Note: English: /ˈkæstroʊ/ KASS-troh, Latin American Spanish: [ˈxwana ðe la kaɾiˈða(ð) xwaˈnita ˈkastɾo ˈrus].) (6 May 1933 – 4 December 2023) was a Cuban-American activist and writer, as well as the sister of Fidel and Raúl, both former presidents of Cuba, and Ramón, a key figure of the Cuban Revolution. Ideologically opposed to her brothers, she collaborated with the Central Intelligence Agency in Cuba from 1961 to 1964, after which she lived in exile in the United States until her death.

== Early life ==
Juana de la Caridad Castro Ruz was born in Birán, near Mayarí, in what was then Oriente Province (now Holguín) on 6 May 1933. She was the fourth child of Ángel Castro y Argiz and Lina Ruz González and had three brothers – Ramón, Fidel, and Raúl – and three sisters – Angelita, Emma, and Agustina. Lina Ruz González was Ángel Castro's cook; he was married to another woman when Juanita and her older brothers were born.

Castro also had five half-siblings: Lidia, Pedro Emilio, Manuel, Antonia, and Georgina, who were raised by Ángel Castro's first wife Maria Luisa Argota, as well as another half-brother, Martín, from her father's relationship with a farmhand.

== Politics ==
Juanita Castro was active in the Cuban revolution, buying weapons for the 26th of July movement during their campaign against Fulgencio Batista. In 1958, she traveled to the US to raise funds to support the insurgent movement. After the revolution, Juanita felt betrayed by the growing influence of Cuban communists in the Cuban government as well as Fidel's violent suppression of political opponents.

Fidel and Raúl's government policies clashed with family business interests. When the two revolutionaries insisted on including the family plantation in their agrarian reform program to limit private land ownership, their older brother Ramón, who had been maintaining the property, angrily exploded, "Raúl is a dirty little Communist. Some day I am going to kill him."

Juanita Castro started collaborating with the Central Intelligence Agency (CIA) in 1961 after being recruited by someone close to her brother Fidel. She later reported that the CIA "wanted to talk to me because they had interesting things to tell me, and interesting things to ask me, such as if I was willing to take the risk". For three years she helped political opponents escape detention and flee the island. Time magazine reported that "after the mother Lina Ruz died in 1963, there was a violent episode when Fidel decided to expropriate the family land once and for all. Juanita started selling the cattle; Fidel flew into a rage, denounced her as a 'counterrevolutionary worm,' and rushed to the [family's] farm."

== Emigration ==
In September 1964, Castro left Cuba for Mexico, staying with her sister Emma, who had married a Mexican man in Cuba and emigrated there. Upon her arrival, she called a press conference and announced that she had defected from Cuba. "I cannot longer remain indifferent to what is happening in my country," she said. "My brothers Fidel and Raúl have made it an enormous prison surrounded by water. The people are nailed to a cross of torment imposed by international Communism." In January 1965 she made a speech at a meeting of the anti-Castro Information Council of the Americas (INCA). Here she received a trophy presented to her by their president Alton Ochsner. She began to be featured on INCA's radio broadcasts of what it called "truth tapes", with Ochsner crediting them as having helped defeat the socialist Salvador Allende in the 1964 Chilean presidential election.

In 1998, she filed a lawsuit in Spain against her niece Alina Fernández, the illegitimate daughter of her brother Fidel Castro, claiming that she had been libeled in some passages in Fernández's autobiography, Castro's Daughter: An Exile's Memoir of Cuba (1998). She claimed the book defamed her family: "People who were eating off Fidel's plate yesterday come here and want money and power, so they say whatever they want, even if it's not true." A Spanish court ordered Fernández and her publisher, Plaza & Janes, a Barcelona-based division of Random House, to pay Castro the equivalent of US$45,000.

On 25 October 2009, Juanita Castro told Univision's WLTV-23 that she had initially supported her brother's 1959 overthrow of the Batista dictatorship but quickly became disillusioned. Her home became a sanctuary for anti-Communists before she fled the island.

== Later life and death ==
After settling in Miami in 1964, Castro opened a pharmacy called Mini Price in 1973. She became a naturalized US citizen in 1984. In December 2006, she sold her pharmacy business to CVS Pharmacy.

Castro published her autobiography in Spanish in 2009 as Fidel y Raúl, mis hermanos. La historia secreta ("Fidel and Raúl, My Brothers: The Secret History"). It was co-written with Mexican journalist María Antonieta Collins.

Castro died at a hospital in Miami, Florida, on 4 December 2023, aged 90.
