= Birán =

- Village
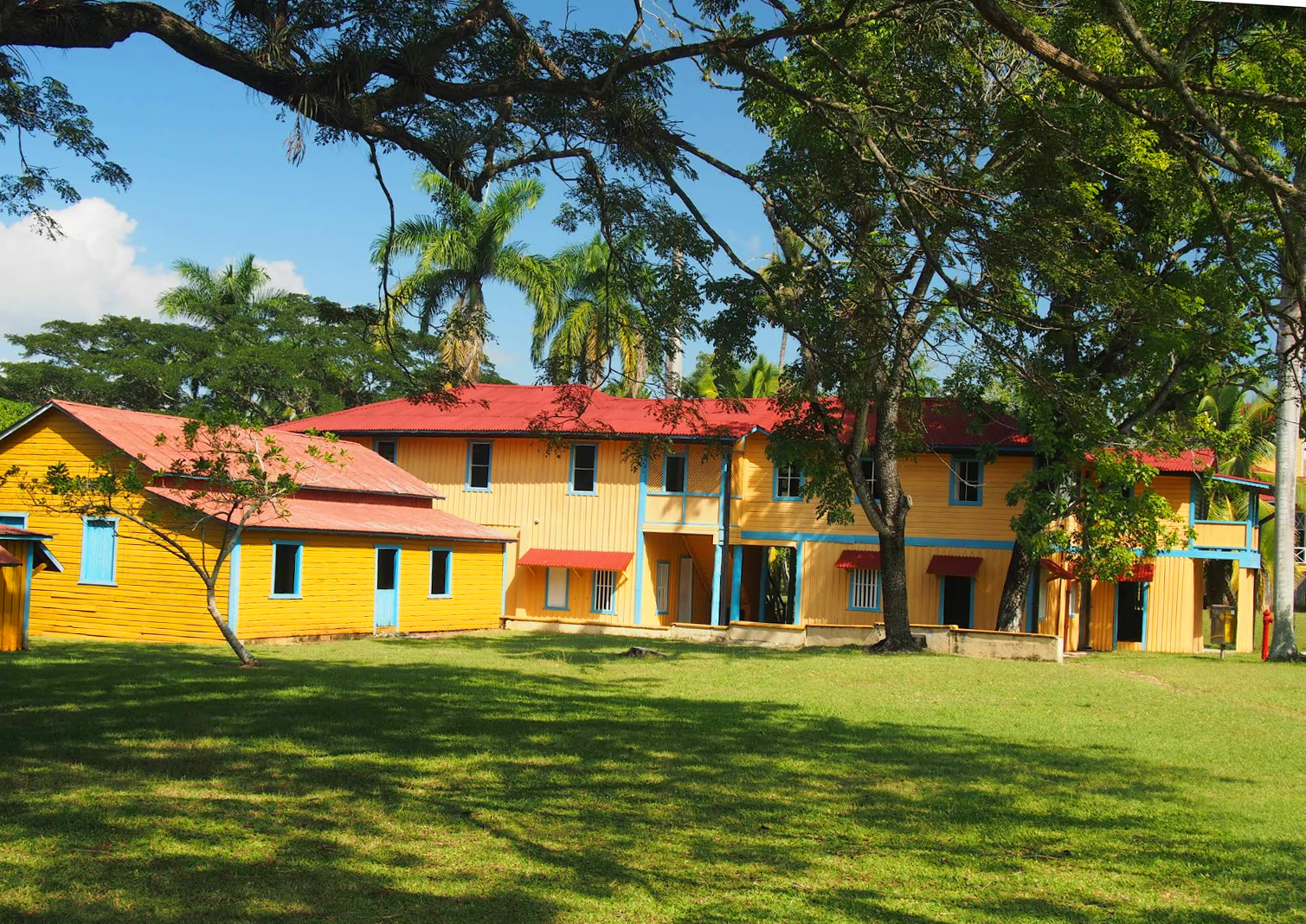
- Birán, Cueto

- Location of Birán in Cuba
- Coordinates: 20°31′48″N 75°53′44″W
- Country: Cuba
- Province: Holguín
- Municipality: Cueto
- Elevation: 66 m (217 ft)

Population (2012)
  - Total: 1,788
- Time zone: UTC-5 (EST)
- Area code: +53-24

Birán is a village in Holguín Province of Cuba, hamlet and consejo popular of Cueto, best known as the birthplace of Ramón, Fidel, Raúl and Juanita Castro. Their father Ángel Castro y Argiz owned a 93-square-kilometre (36 sq mi) plantation there.

== History ==
Until the 1976 municipal reform, the village was part of the neighboring municipality of Mayarí.

A farm in Birán was the birthplace of former Cuban revolutionary leaders Ramón Castro Ruz, Fidel Castro, Raúl Castro and their sister Juanita Castro.

== Geography ==
It is located 30 kilometers (19 mi) south-west of Mayarí and 9 kilometers (5.6 mi) south of Cueto, in the foothills of the Nipe Mountains (Sierra de Nipe).

== See also ==
- Nicaro-Levisa
- Guatemala (village)
