= Ramón Castro Ruz =

Cuban revolutionary (1924–2016)

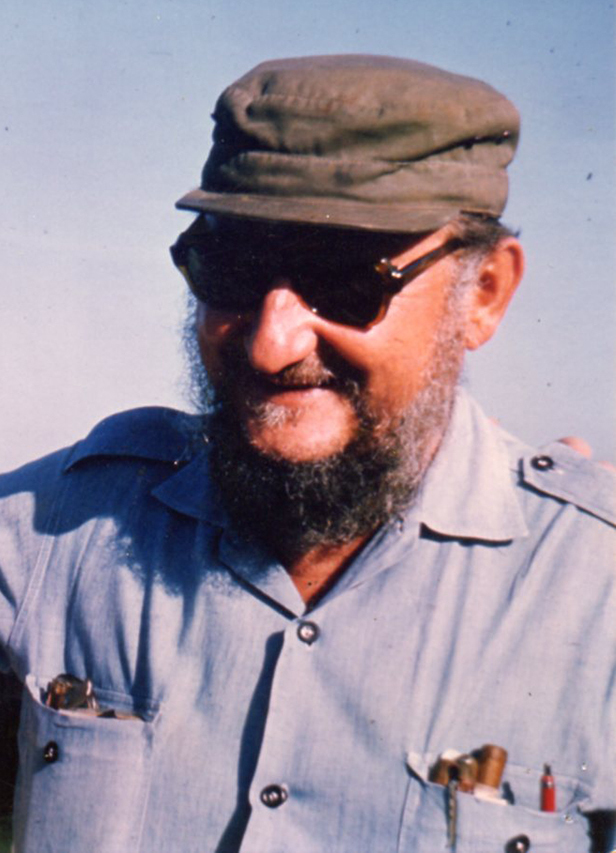
- Born: Ramón Eusebio Castro Ruz; 14 October 1924; Birán, Oriente, Republic of Cuba
- Died: 23 February 2016 (aged 91); Havana, Cuba
- Spouse: Janice Castro
- Children: 3
- Parents: Ángel Castro y Argiz (father); Lina Ruz González (mother)
- Relatives: Fidel Castro (brother); Raúl Castro (brother); Juanita Castro (sister); Fidel Castro Díaz-Balart (nephew); Alina Fernández (niece); Mariela Castro (niece); Alejandro Castro Espín (nephew)

Ramón Eusebio Castro Ruz (Note: In this Spanish name, the first or paternal surname is Castro and the second or maternal family name is Ruz.) (Note: English: /ˈkæstroʊ/ KASS-troh, Latin American Spanish: [raˈmon ewˈseβjo ˈkastɾo ˈrus].) (14 October 1924 – 23 February 2016) was a Cuban revolutionary, activist and farmer. He was the eldest brother of Fidel and Raúl Castro and a key figure of the early days of the Cuban Revolution. He kept a much lower profile than his brothers throughout his life, focusing on agriculture.

== Biography ==
Ramón, the eldest of the Castro brothers, the son of Ángel Castro, a Spanish-born rancher, and his second wife, Lina Ruz, grew up on his family's large farm in Birán, Holguin province, in eastern Cuba. Ramon Castro, who studied agricultural engineering, spent his life tending crops and livestock. He oversaw Cuba's sugar production in the 1960s to help increase output, and he founded several state companies handling production and transport of food crops. He also participated in agricultural research. "Physically, he is stunningly like his brother Fidel, an enormous, heavy-set, gruff bear of a man, with a scraggly beard, a red face, a blustery manner, a ready teasing smile and bright dancing eyes," wrote American journalist, Sally Quinn, who in 1977 was rare in being offered a unique opportunity to do an interview in Cuba. Habaneros and tourists alike would confuse Ramón for his brother Fidel, as they passed in the streets of Havana. He would declare "No, soy Mongo" using a childhood nickname that only his friends and family would know.

Although not active in the armed rebellion like his brothers, Ramón Castro aided in the revolution as the quartermaster for the troops of Fidel and Raúl, sending them weapons and supplies. He also established and maintained pipelines from the cities to the troops in the field. He also manufactured an alcohol-based fuel for Cuba during a gasoline shortage. He later said he led a network of 1,200 men: "All of them were thieves. We stole things for the war."

After the revolution, the 87.6 km^{2} (33.8 mi^{2}) family farm that employed 400 people and produced sugar cane, oranges, cattle and lumber, along with its core 26 buildings became legal property of the state. He was allowed to retain 4 km^{2} (1.5 mi^{2}). He was occasionally at odds with the new government. In November 1959, after Fidel denounced the newspaper Prensa Libre for opposing the revolution, Ramón came to the newspaper's defense. The government's official newspaper then denounced Ramón in an editorial on its front page that said he had not joined the insurgents alongside his brothers in the 1950s because of his "lack of courage and the permanent desire to make money". A year later he was attacked for his role in the Cuba Cane Growers Association, an organization that had been dissolved for its association with U.S. interests before the revolution and a lack of enthusiasm for the revolution after it succeeded. Before that season's harvest concluded, he called for raising wage rates for 200,000 laborers on private sugar cane farms to match those paid on cooperative farms.

He worked as a consultant to government ministries and founded the state-owned companies that managed the production of oranges and the transportation of sugarcane. He was one of the founders of the Communist Party of Cuba in 1965 and served as a deputy in the National Assembly, the Cuban legislature. He studied and implemented improved production techniques in sugarcane and dairy farming. In the 1990s, he helped facilitate the importation of cattle from Florida, which led to the creation of a new breed of cattle. Of his brother's fame he said: "Fidel has one ambition. I have another. His thing is political. Mine is the street. I am free, and he's in a kind of a prison." Unlike Fidel, he continued to smoke cigars until the day he died.

In 2007, when Fidel was recovering from surgery, Ramón told an interviewer that he "is doing very well, protected by the socialist saints. [...] All of us brothers are very resilient."

He and his wife Janice had three children, Ramón Omar, Lina, and Ángel Castro. Castro died on 23 February 2016. His death was announced in Granma, the official newspaper of the Cuban Communist Party. His brother Fidel died 9 months later on 25 November 2016.
