= Raúl Castro =

First Secretary of the Communist Party of Cuba from 2011 to 2021

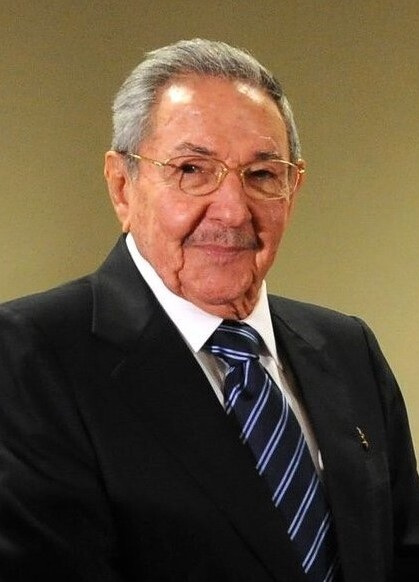
- Castro in 2015

First Secretary of the Communist Party of Cuba
- In office 19 April 2011 – 19 April 2021
- President: Himself; Miguel Díaz-Canel
- Prime Minister: Manuel Marrero Cruz (2019–2021)
- Deputy: José Ramón Machado Ventura
- Preceded by: Fidel Castro
- Succeeded by: Miguel Díaz-Canel

16th President of the Council of State and Ministers of Cuba
- In office 31 July 2006 (Note: Acting: 31 July 2006 – 24 February 2008) – 19 April 2018
- Vice President: José Ramón Machado Ventura; Miguel Díaz-Canel
- Preceded by: Fidel Castro
- Succeeded by: Miguel Díaz-Canel

Second Secretary of the Communist Party of Cuba
- In office 3 October 1965 – 19 April 2011
- First secretary: Fidel Castro
- Preceded by: Position established
- Succeeded by: José Ramón Machado Ventura

First Vice President of Cuba
- In office 2 December 1976 – 24 February 2008
- President: Fidel Castro
- Preceded by: Position established
- Succeeded by: José Ramón Machado Ventura

Minister of Defence
- In office 16 February 1959 – 24 February 2008
- Prime Minister: Fidel Castro
- Preceded by: Position established
- Succeeded by: Julio Casas Regueiro

Secretary-General of the Non-Aligned Movement
- In office 16 September 2006 (Note: Acting: 16 September 2006 – 24 February 2008) – 16 July 2009
- Preceded by: Fidel Castro
- Succeeded by: Hosni Mubarak

President pro tempore of CELAC
- In office 28 January 2013 – 28 January 2014
- Preceded by: Sebastián Piñera
- Succeeded by: Laura Chinchilla

Personal details
- Born: Raúl Modesto Castro Ruz; 3 June 1931 (age 95) Birán, Oriente, Cuba
- Party: 26th of July Movement (1953–1962); United Party of the Socialist Revolution (1962–1965); Communist Party (1965–present)
- Spouse: Vilma Espín (m. 1959; died 2007)
- Children: 4, including Mariela and Alejandro
- Parents: Ángel Castro y Argiz (father); Lina Ruz González (mother)
- Relatives: Fidel Castro (brother); Ramón Castro Ruz (brother); Juanita Castro (sister); Fidel Castro Díaz-Balart (nephew); Alina Fernández (niece)

Military service
- Allegiance: Republic of Cuba
- Branch/service: Revolutionary Armed Forces
- Years of service: 1953–1959
- Rank: Comandante en Jefe (as President); General de Ejército
- Unit: 26th of July Movement
- Battles/wars: Attack on the Moncada Barracks; Cuban Revolution; Bay of Pigs Invasion; Cuban Missile Crisis
- Awards: Hero of the Republic of Cuba; Order of Prince Yaroslav the Wise; National Order of Mali; Order Prince Daniel of Good Faith First Degree

Raúl Modesto Castro Ruz (Note: English: /ˈkæstroʊ/ KASS-troh, Latin American Spanish: [raˈul moˈðesto ˈkastɾo ˈrus].) (born 3 June 1931) is a Cuban politician, general, and revolutionary who served as the leader of Cuba from 2008 to 2021. He served as the first secretary of the Communist Party of Cuba, the most senior position in the one-party communist state, from 2011 to 2021, and President of Cuba between 2008 and 2018, (Note: Acting between 2006 and 2008.) succeeding his brother Fidel Castro. He is still considered the de facto leader of the country by some commentators.

One of the military leaders of the Cuban Revolution, Castro served as the minister of the Armed Forces from 1959 to 2008. His ministerial tenure made him the longest-serving minister of the armed forces. Castro was also a member of the Politburo of the Communist Party of Cuba, the highest decision-making body, from 1965 until 2021.

Because of his brother's illness, Castro became the acting president of the Council of State in a temporary transfer of power from 31 July 2006. Castro was officially made president by the National Assembly on 24 February 2008, after his brother, who was still ailing, announced on 19 February 2008 that he would not stand again. He was re-elected president on 24 February 2013. Shortly thereafter, Castro announced that his second term would be his final term, and that he would not seek re-election in 2018. He stepped down from the presidency on 19 April 2018 after his successor, Miguel Díaz-Canel, was elected by the National Assembly following parliamentary elections. Castro remained the first secretary of the Communist Party. Castro announced at the Eighth Congress of the Communist Party of Cuba, which began on 16 April 2021, that he was retiring. His successor, Miguel Díaz-Canel, was voted in on 19 April.

Castro was also the head of the constitutional reform commission, and continues to have a seat representing Santiago de Cuba's Segundo Frente municipality in the National Assembly. Castro is currently the oldest living politician in Cuba and one of the oldest living state leaders.

== Early life ==
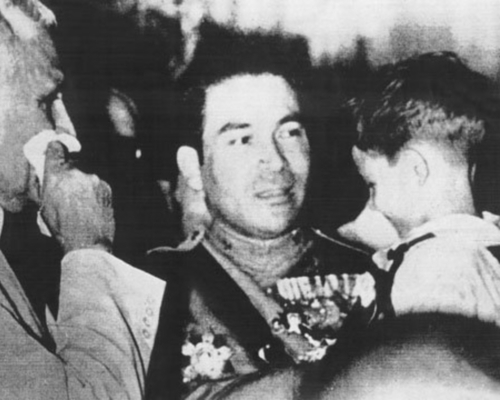
Castro carried by Fulgencio Batista in 1938. In 1959, Castro and his brother would topple Batista from power.

Raúl Modesto Castro Ruz was born in Birán (at that time in Oriente Province), Cuba, the son of a Spanish immigrant father, Ángel Castro, who was 55 at the time of his birth, and a Cuban-born mother of Canarian parentage, Lina Ruz. Raúl has two elder brothers – Ramón and Fidel – and four sisters: Angela, Juanita, Emma, and Agustina. Ángel Castro's first wife, Maria Argota, also raised five half-siblings of Raúl: Pedro Emilio, Maria Lidia, Manuel, Antonia, and Georgina.

As children, the Castro brothers were expelled from the first school they attended (Colegio La Salle) in Santiago de Cuba. Like Fidel, Raúl later attended the Jesuit School of Colegio Dolores in Santiago de Cuba and Belen Jesuit Preparatory School in Havana. Raúl, as an undergraduate, studied Public Administration at the University of Havana starting in 1950, but he did not graduate. Whereas Fidel was an excellent student, Raúl turned in mostly mediocre performances. Raúl became a committed socialist and joined the Socialist Youth, an affiliate of the Soviet-oriented Popular Socialist Party, the island's Communist party. The brothers participated actively in sometimes violent student actions.

In 1953, Raúl served as a member of the 26th of July Movement group that attacked the Moncada Barracks; he received a 13-year prison sentence and spent 22 months in prison as a result of this action. During his subsequent exile in Mexico, he participated in the preparations for the expedition of the boat Granma to Cuba.

== Commander in the Cuban Revolution ==
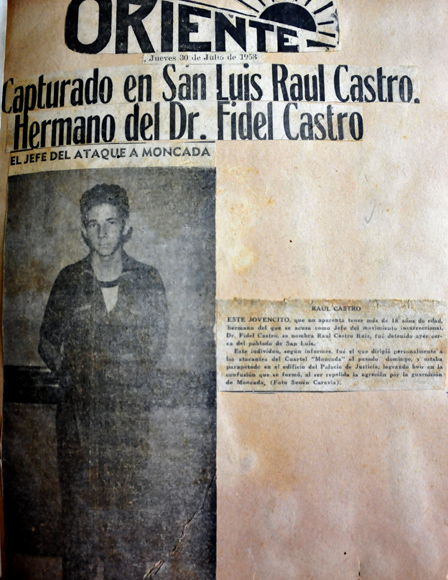
Image from Oriente newspaper from 30 July 1953 after the capture of Castro

When the Granma landing failed, and the 82 expeditionaries were detected by government troops soon after, Raúl was one of only 12 fighters who managed to reach a safe haven in the Sierra Maestra mountains, forming the core of the nascent rebel army (see Cuban Revolution). As Fidel's brother and trusted right-hand man, and given his proven leadership abilities during and after the Moncada attack, he was given progressively bigger commands. On 27 February 1958, Raúl was made comandante and assigned the mission to cross the old province of Oriente, leading a column of guerrillas to open, to the northeast of that territory, the "Frank País Eastern Front."

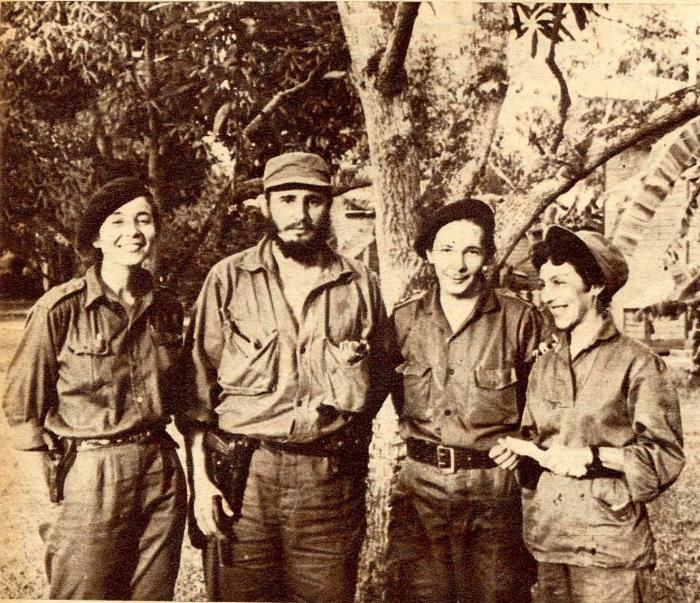
Raúl Castro (third from left) with his wife Vilma Espín, brother Fidel Castro, and Celia Sánchez on the Second Eastern Front, 1958

As a result of Raúl's "Eastern Front" operations, he was not involved in the pivotal Operation Verano (which came close to destroying the main body of fighters but ended up a spectacular victory for Fidel), but Raúl's forces remained active and grew over time.

On 26 June 1958, Raúl Castro's rebels kidnapped ten Americans and two Canadians from the property of Moa Bay Mining Company (an American company) on the north coast of Oriente Province. The next day, rebels took hostage 24 U.S. servicemen on leave from the United States naval base at Guantanamo Bay. This incident brought the total kidnapped hostages to 36 (34 U.S. and 2 Canadian citizens).

U.S. Ambassador Earl E. T. Smith and his staff determined the kidnappings had the following objectives: Obtain worldwide publicity, regain M-26-7 prestige lost by the failure of the call for a general strike, force Batista's Air Force to stop bombing rebel holds, and gain public recognition from the U.S. Two tactical objectives the kidnapping achieved for Castro forces can be discerned from contemporaneous reporting in Time: Batista declaring a ceasefire for negotiations, forcing a reduction in Operation Verano air raids; the rebels using the lulls to regroup and fly in arms.

The hostage-taking caused significant U.S. backlash, including unfavorable public reaction, and the U.S. considered re-establishing military support to Batista and deploying U.S. forces to free the hostages. Ultimately, the hostages were released in very small groups, extracting the maximum press attention. After their release, the hostages said they were treated well with some even claiming to support the rebel cause.

Regarding the captured Batista government soldiers, Raúl Castro notes in his war diaries: "All three were brought food and told that they would be released and only their weapons would be kept. They had money and watches we needed, but according to our principles, we didn't touch them." In the territories under guerrilla control, it created an autonomous structure by establishing hospitals, schools and several material manufacturing plants. In 1958, he was also at the origin of the M-26 intelligence services.

By October 1958, after reinforcement by Fidel, the brothers had about 2,000 fighters and were operating freely throughout Oriente province. In December, while Che Guevara and Camilo Cienfuegos were operating in Santa Clara, Fidel and Raúl's army laid siege to Maffo, capturing it on 30 December. Their victorious army then headed to Santiago de Cuba, capital of Oriente province.

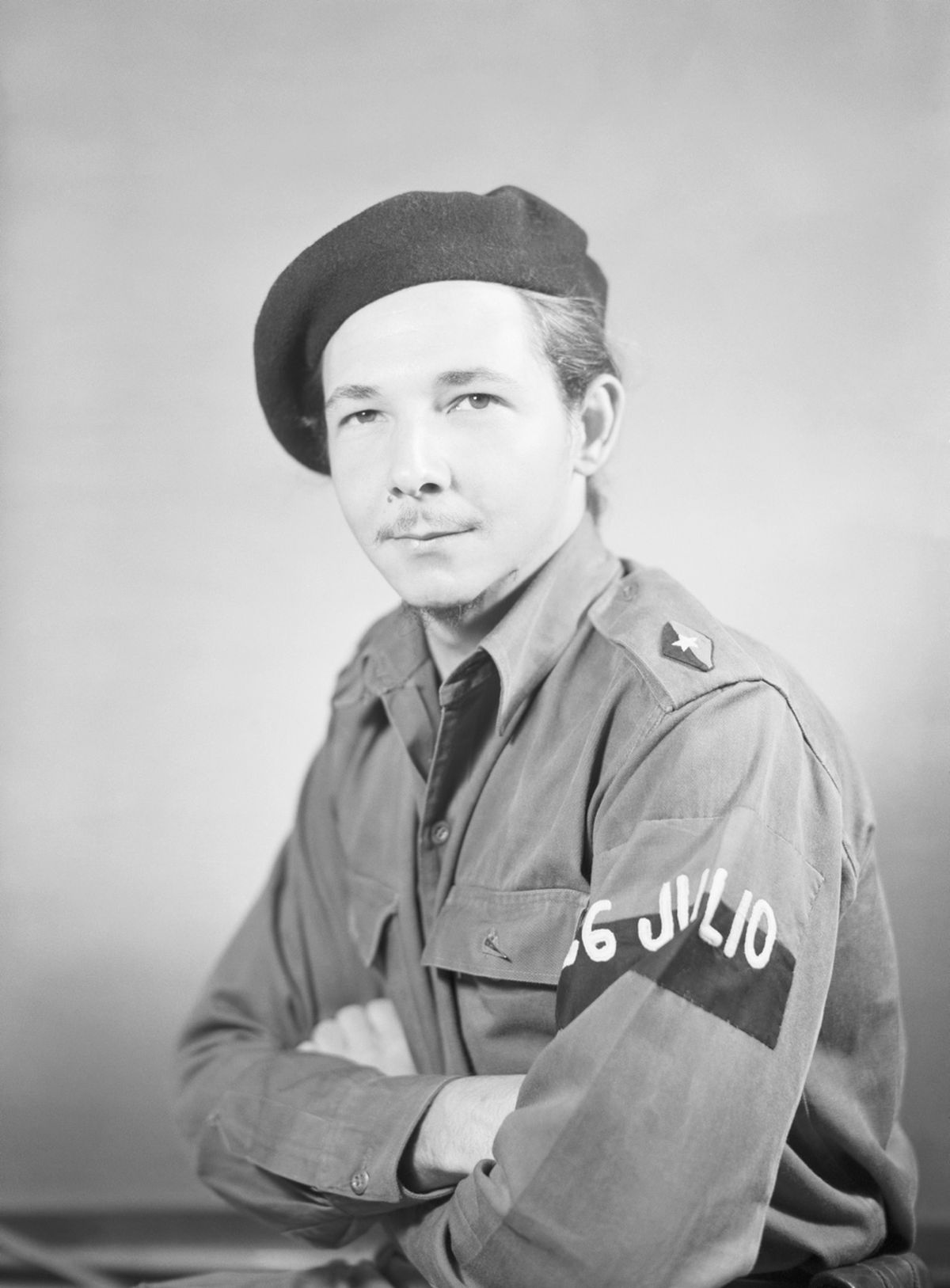
Castro in 1959

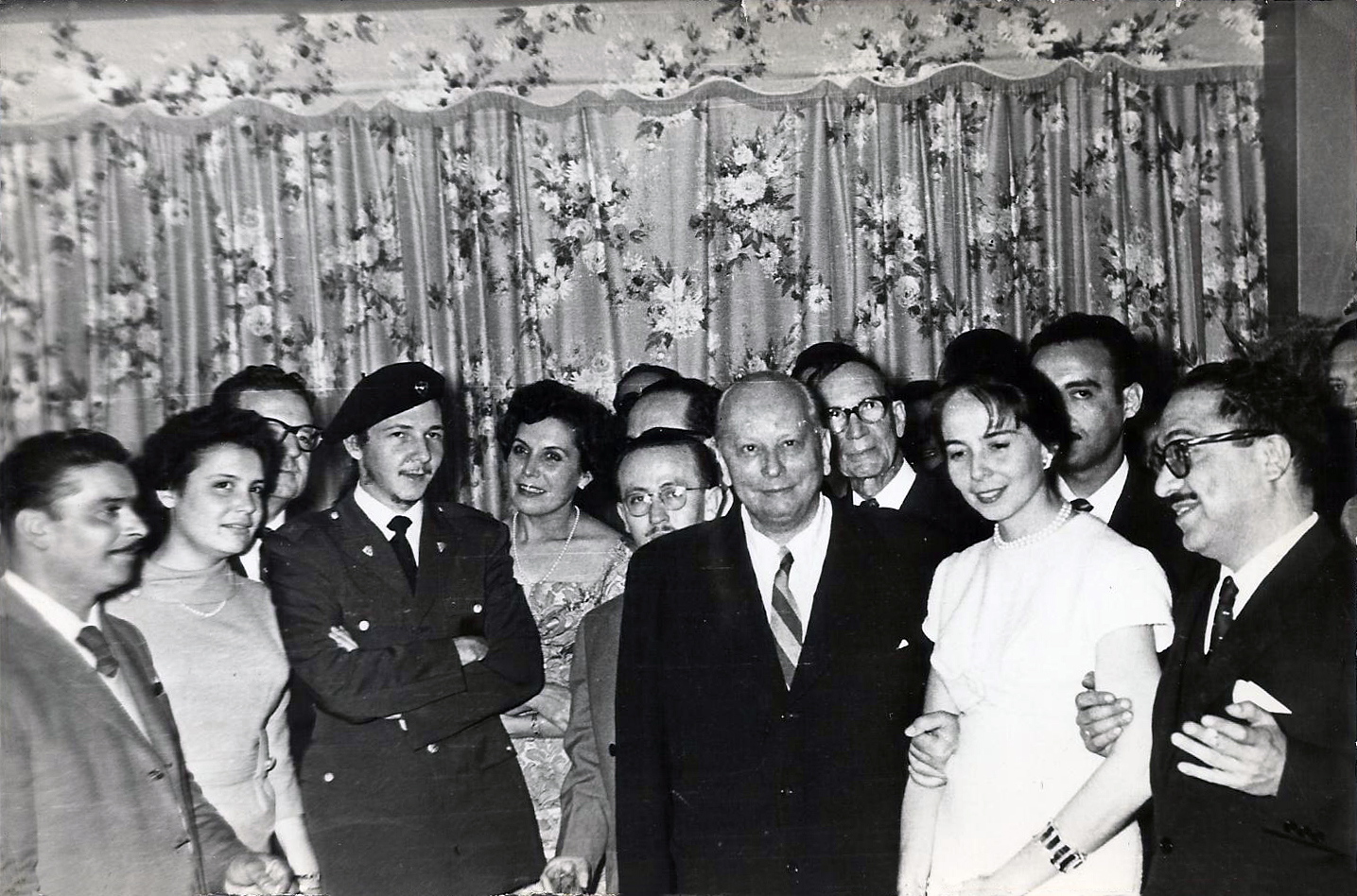
Raúl Castro as a military officer standing behind Cipriano Pontigo (first on the left) with Senator Salvador Allende and Hortensia Bussi, August 1959

In response to the victory by Che Guevara at the Battle of Santa Clara, the U.S.-backed President Fulgencio Batista fled Cuba in the early morning of 1 January 1959. The two Castro brothers with their army arrived on the outskirts of Santiago de Cuba and said their forces would storm the city at 6 P.M. on 1 January if it did not first surrender. The commander (Colonel Rego Rubido) surrendered Santiago de Cuba without a fight. The war was over, and Fidel was able to take power in Havana when he arrived on 8 January 1959.

Raúl's abilities as a military leader during the revolution are hard to see clearly. Unlike Che Guevara or Cienfuegos, Raúl had no significant victories he could claim credit for on his own. After Batista's fall, Raúl had the task of overseeing trials and execution of between 30 and 70 soldiers loyal to deposed President Batista who had been convicted of war crimes.

== Political career ==
=== Early political career ===
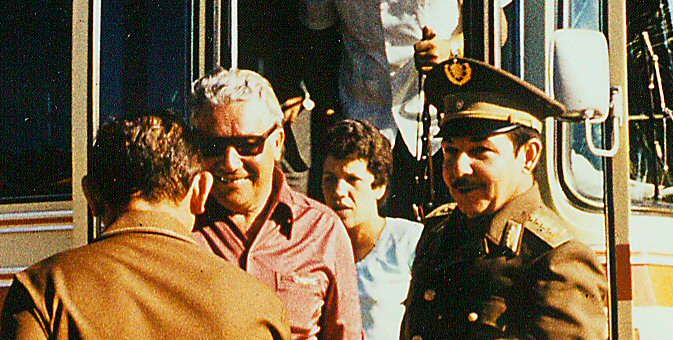
East German Minister of National Defense Heinz Hoffmann and Raúl Castro near Havana, Cuba, 1977

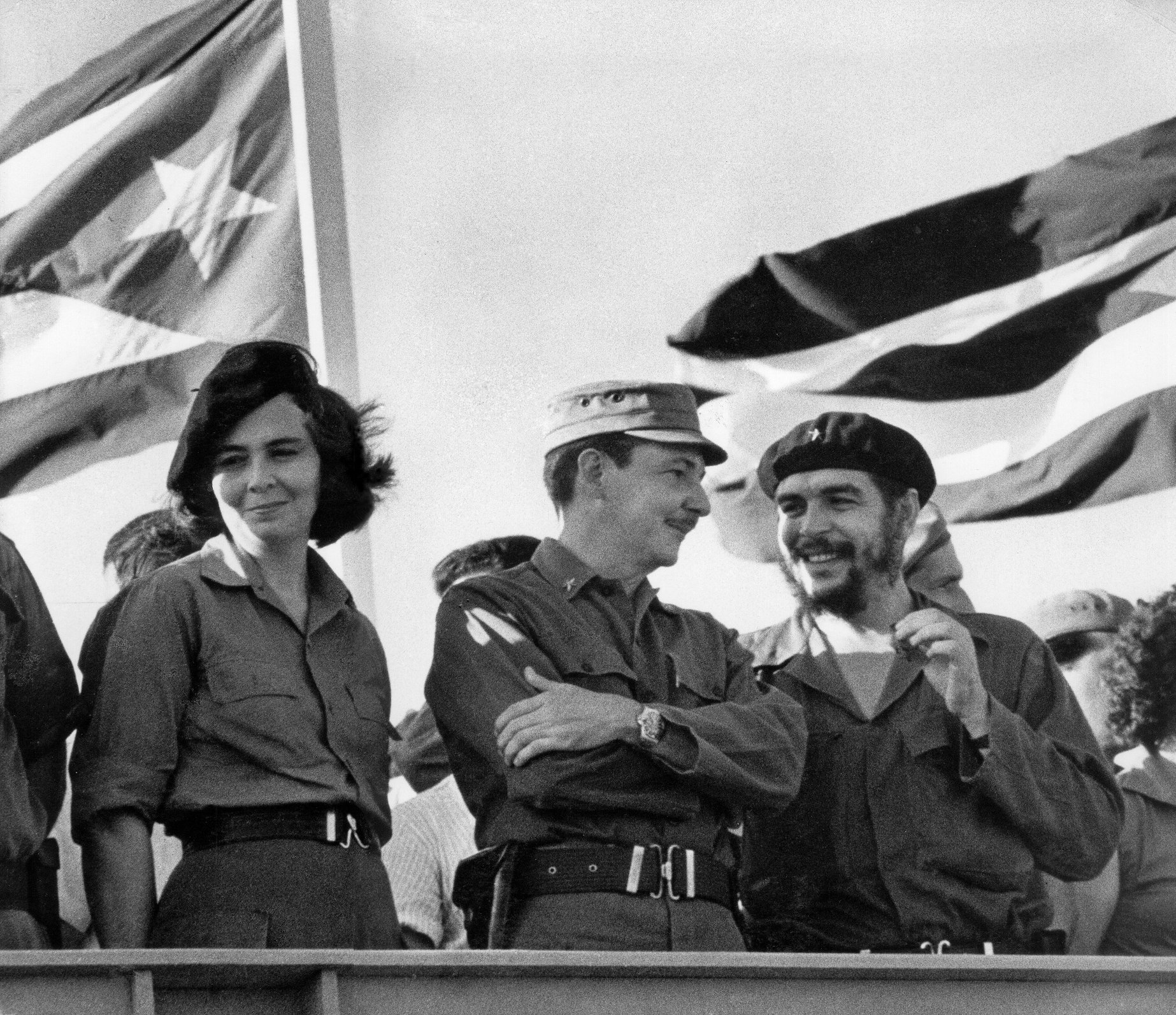
Vilma Espín, Raúl Castro and Che Guevara, on 26 July 1964

Raúl Castro Ruz was a member of the national leadership of the Integrated Revolutionary PO Organizations (established July 1961; dissolved March 1962) and of the United Party of the Socialist Revolution of Cuba (established March 1962; dissolved October 1965). He is also credited with helping shoot down a Lockheed U2 and killing Major Rudolf Anderson.

He served as a member of the Central Committee of the Communist Party of Cuba and Second Secretary of its Politburo from the Party's formation in October 1965; also, as First Vice President of the Cuban Council of State of the National Assembly of People's Power and Council of Ministers when these were established in 1976.

=== Assumption of presidential duties ===
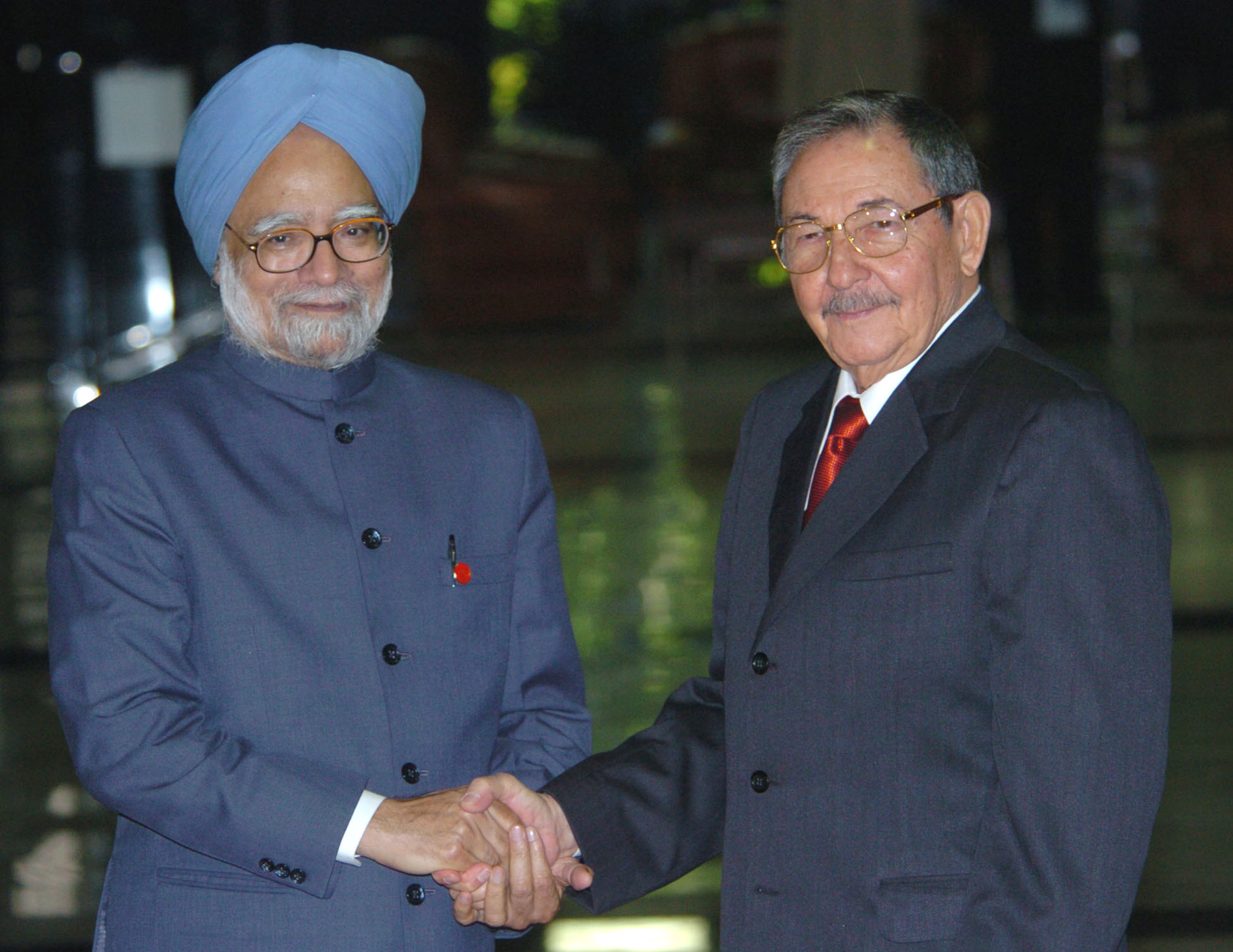
Manmohan Singh with Castro on sidelines the 14th Non-Aligned Movement Summit at Havana, Cuba on 15 September 2006

On 31 July 2006, Fidel Castro's personal secretary, Carlos Valenciaga, announced on state-run television that Fidel Castro would provisionally hand over the duties of First Secretary of the Communist Party of Cuba (party chief), President of the Council of State of Cuba (head of state), President of the Council of Ministers of Cuba (prime minister), and Commander-in-Chief of the Armed Forces to Raúl Castro while Fidel underwent and recovered from intestinal surgery to repair gastrointestinal bleeding.

Many commentators regarded Raúl Castro as a political hardliner who would maintain the Communist Party of Cuba's influence in the country. However, others believed that he was more pragmatic than his older brother and willing to institute some market-oriented economic policies. It was speculated that he favored a variant of the current Chinese and Vietnamese political and economic model for Cuba in the hopes of preserving some elements of the socialist system.

Raúl is considered by some to be less charismatic than his brother Fidel Castro, who remained largely out of public view during the transfer-of-duty period. His few public appearances included hosting a gathering of leaders of the Non-Aligned nations in September 2006, and leading the national commemoration of the 50th anniversary of the landing of the boat Granma, which also became Fidel's belated 80th-birthday celebrations.

In a speech to university students, Raúl stated that a communist system in Cuba would remain, and that "Fidel is irreplaceable, unless we all replace him together."

On 1 May 2007, Raúl presided over the May Day celebrations in Havana. According to Granma, the crowd reached over one million participants, with delegations from over 225 organizations and 52 countries.

Raúl has a reputation for his businesslike, unanimated delivery of speeches.

=== Communist leader ===
After assuming what was originally announced as a temporary control over the presidency in 2006, on 24 February 2008 Raúl Castro won election as the new President of the Council of State and President of the Council of Ministers during a legislative session held at Cuba's Palace of Conventions in Havana. His administration subsequently announced several economic reforms. In March 2008 the government removed restrictions on the purchase of numerous products not available under Fidel Castro's administration – including DVD-players, computers, rice cookers, and microwaves. In an effort to boost food production, the government allowed private farmers and cooperatives to lease idle state-owned land and moved much of the decision-making process regarding land use from the national level to the municipal level.

All death sentences (about 30) were commuted between 2008 and 2010, although none had been executed since 2003.

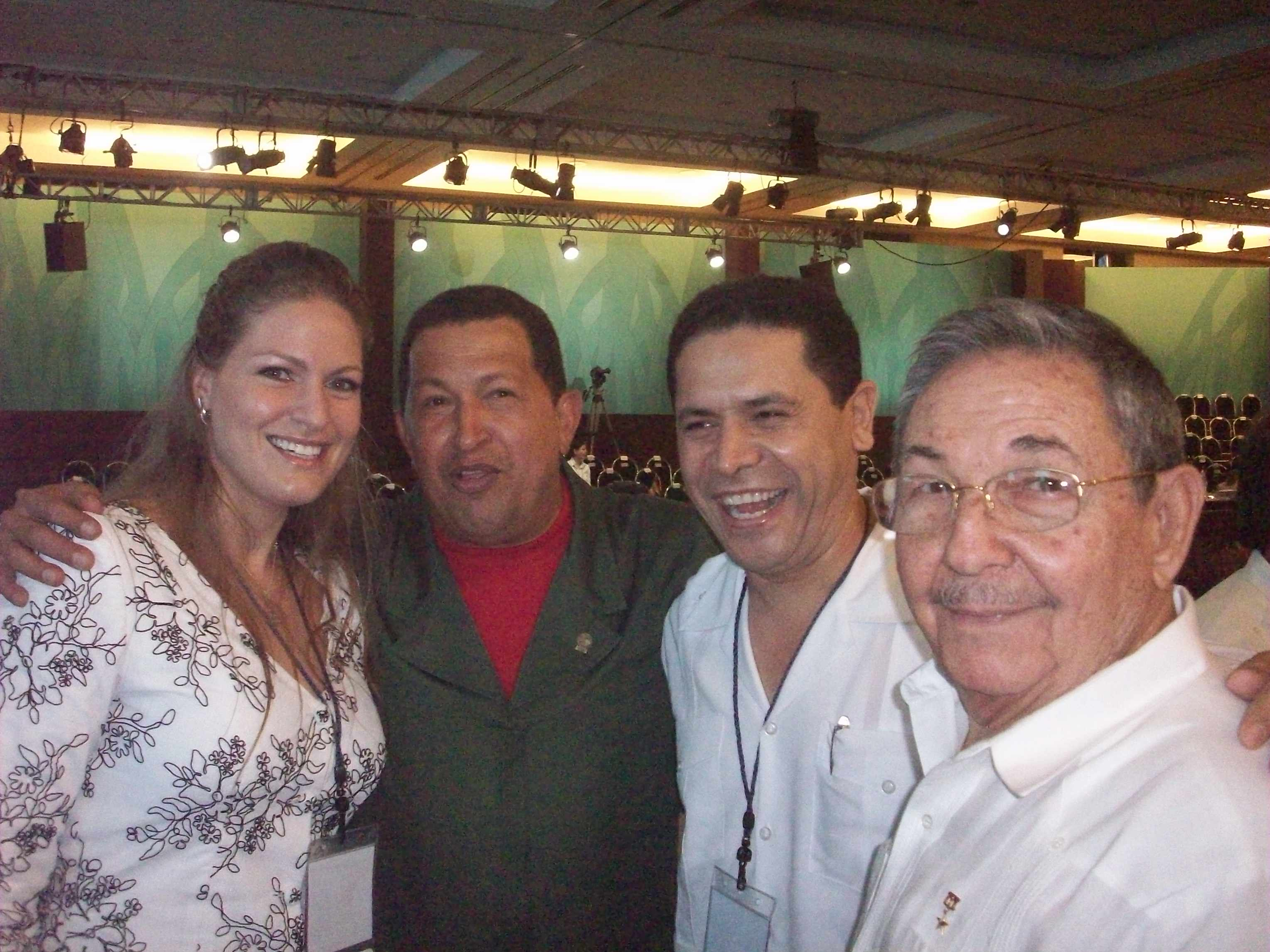
Raúl Castro with Hugo Chávez, 2010

In mid-2008, the government overhauled the salary structure of all state-run companies so that harder-working employees could earn higher wages. In addition, the government removed restrictions against the use of cell phones and investigated the removal of travel restrictions on Cubans.

In March 2009, Raúl Castro dismissed some officials.

In April 2011, Raúl announced a plan of 300 economic reforms encouraging private initiative, reducing state spending, encouraging foreign investment and agrarian reforms. He also announced a limitation on presidential terms, including his own.

On 24 February 2013, Cuba's parliament named Raúl Castro to a new five-year term as president and appointed Miguel Díaz-Canel as his first vice president. Castro announced that day that he would step down from power after his second term as president ended in 2018.

In 2018, he was selected as a candidate for the National Assembly of People's Power by the Segundo Frente municipality in Santiago de Cuba, regarded as the cradle of the Cuban Revolution.

Miguel Díaz-Canel took over as President of Cuba (President of the Council of State) on 19 April 2018. However, Raúl Castro remained First Secretary of the Central Committee of the Communist Party, and hence the de facto leader of Cuba, until he resigned on 19 April 2021.

=== Normalization of relations with the United States ===
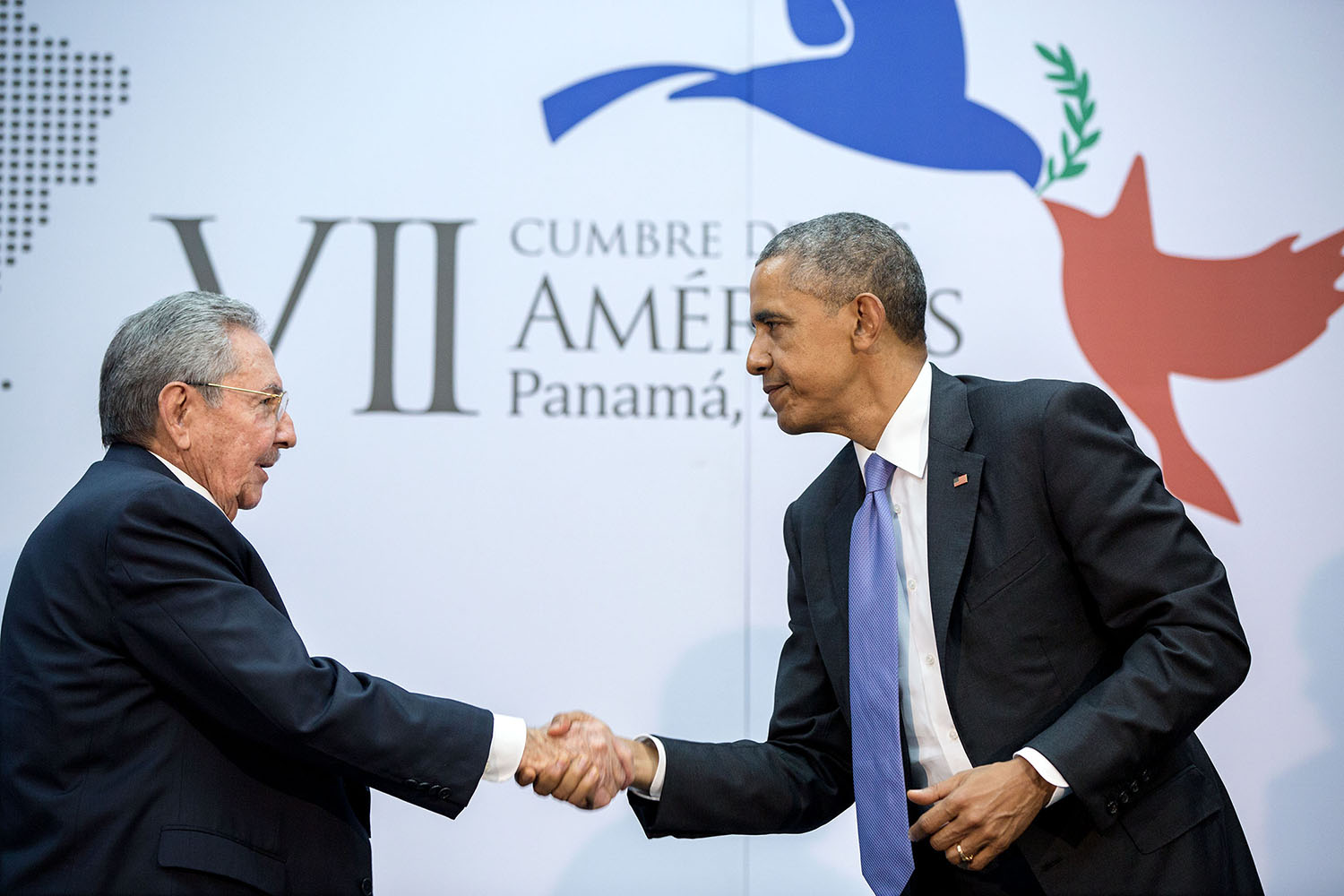
Castro shaking hands with U.S. President Barack Obama in Panama during the Summit of the Americas on 11 April 2015

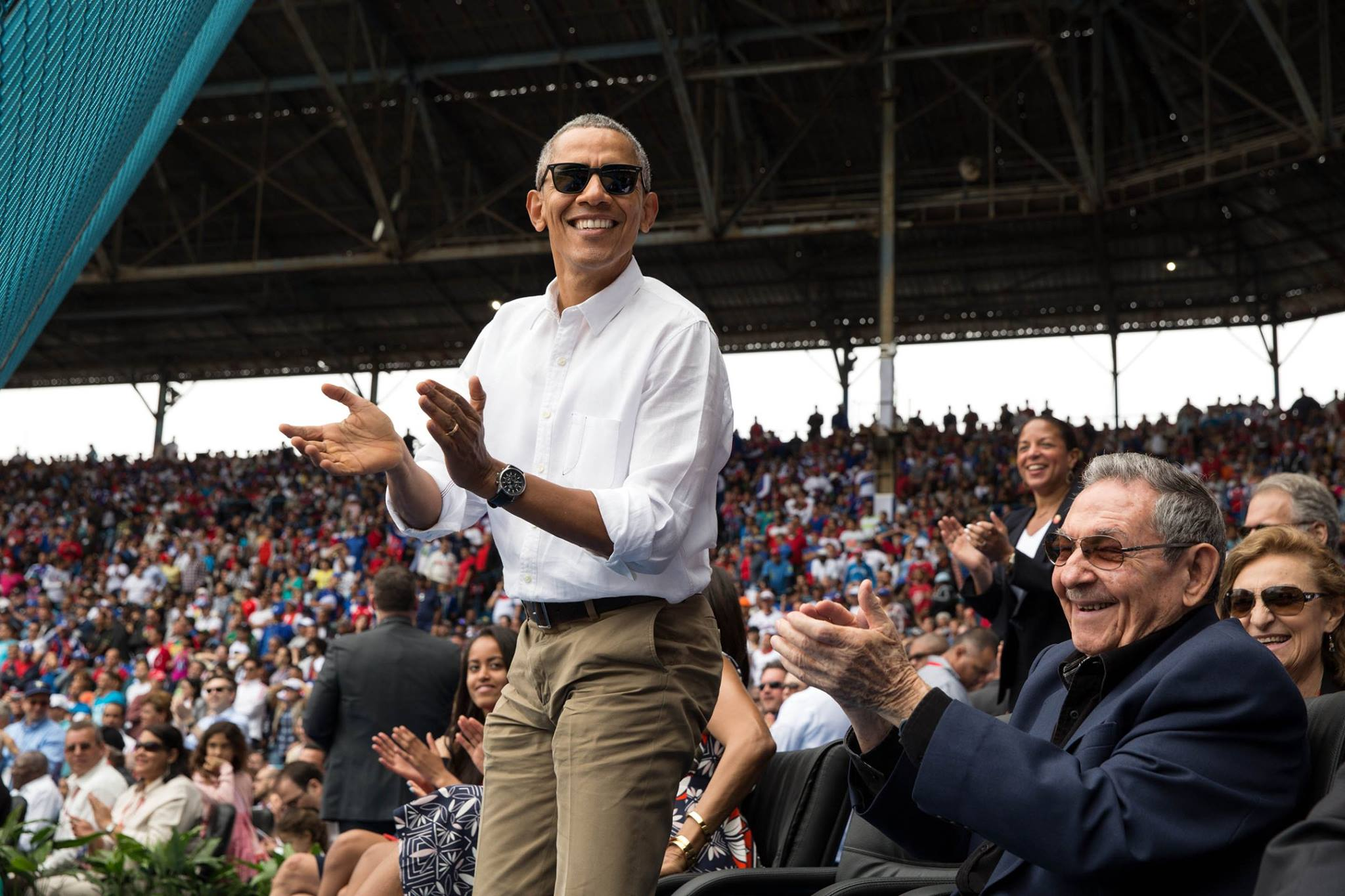
President Barack Obama and President Raúl Castro during an exhibition baseball game between the Tampa Bay Rays and the Cuban National Team at the Estadio Latinoamericano in Havana on March 22, 2016

Raúl Castro said in a 2008 interview: "The American people are among our closest neighbors. We should respect each other. We have never held anything against the American people. Good relations would be mutually advantageous. Perhaps we cannot solve all of our problems, but we can solve a good many of them."

On 10 December 2013, Castro, in a significant move, shook hands with and greeted American President Barack Obama at the Nelson Mandela memorial service in Johannesburg.

On 17 December 2014, Castro and Obama made separate announcements to the effect that efforts to normalize relations between the two nations would begin with the re-establishment of embassies in Havana and Washington. Direct diplomatic relations had previously ceased in 1961 after Cuba became closely allied with the USSR.

Argentine-born Pope Francis facilitated the rapprochement between the U.S. and Cuba, allowing the Vatican to be used for secret negotiations. Castro and Obama made simultaneous public announcements about the progress toward normalization.

On 20 July 2015, Cuba and the United States officially resumed full diplomatic relations with the sections of "Cuban interests" in Washington, D.C., and "U.S. interests" in Havana upgraded to embassies.

On 20 March 2016, Obama made a visit to Cuba to meet with Castro – the first visit of a sitting U.S. president to Cuba in 88 years.

Speaking in 2017, Castro criticized U.S. President Donald Trump's proposition of the Mexican wall and restrictive trade policy. Castro called Trump's plans egotistical and – for the border – irrational. "You can't contain poverty, catastrophes, and migrants with walls, but with cooperation, understanding, and peace," Castro said. In November 2016 Trump (as U.S. President-elect) targeted Raúl in a tweet, saying, "If Cuba is unwilling to make a better deal for the Cuban people, the Cuban/American people and the U.S. as a whole, I will terminate deal."

Castro surprised a top American envoy in September 2017 while discussing alleged sonic attacks on American diplomatic staff. He denied involvement but allowed the FBI access to investigate the incident that allegedly left 21 people with hearing loss and brain damage.

In September 2019, the United States sanctioned Castro and barred him from entering the U.S. due to Cuba's support of the Nicolás Maduro government in Venezuela during the presidential crisis and alleged human-rights abuses caused by the government.

=== Retirement ===
On 16 April 2021, the 8th Congress of the Communist Party of Cuba assembled for a four-day meeting, marking the start of Castro's final transfer of leadership and retirement from politics. Miguel Díaz-Canel was elected Castro's successor as First Secretary of the Communist Party on 19 April 2021.

Castro makes occasional public appearances and speeches, for instance at the celebration of the 65th anniversary of the Cuban Revolution on 1 January 2024. Though officially retired, Raúl Castro still retains a seat in the National Assembly and the title of Army General. He is also considered to wield great influence on affairs of state from behind the scenes.

On 15 January 2026, 94-year-old Castro was present, alongside President Miguel Díaz-Canel, in a ceremony in Havana to pay tribute to 32 Cuban soldiers killed in the 2026 United States intervention in Venezuela.

On 23 April 2026, Castro and five others were indicted (sealed indictment) by a U.S. grand jury in Miami, Florida, in connection with the 1996 shootdown of Brothers to the Rescue aircraft when a Cuban Air Force Mikoyan MiG-29UB shot down two unarmed Cessna 337 Skymaster aircraft operated by Brothers to the Rescue, an organization opposed to the Cuban government, killing four men on 24 February 1996. The indictment was unsealed and announced by Acting U.S. Attorney General Todd Blanche on 20 May 2026.

== Public and personal life ==
Castro married Vilma Espín, a former Massachusetts Institute of Technology chemical engineering student and the daughter of a wealthy lawyer for the Bacardi rum company, on 26 January 1959. Vilma became president of the Cuban Federation of Women. They have three daughters (Déborah, Mariela, and Nilsa) and one son (Alejandro) Castro Espín. Vilma Espín died on 18 June 2007.

Alejandro is a Colonel in the Ministry of the Interior, as director of the office of Intelligence Coordination between MININT and MINFAR, with full oversight and access to all of the activities of the Intelligence services. Most foreign analysts consider him to be the "czar" of Cuban Intelligence and Raul's link to maintaining control over MININT, balancing it with his own control of MINFAR. He is widely viewed as Raul's most trusted advisor and is likely being prepared for a future leadership role. Their daughter Mariela Castro currently heads the National Center for Sex Education, while Déborah was married to Colonel Luis Alberto Rodríguez, head of GAESA, the Armed Forces' economic division. He is widely regarded as one of the most powerful figures in the Cuban Economy due to the Military's hold on most of the lucrative business sectors. Deborah's son, Raul Guillermo, nicknamed El Cangrejo (The Crab) due to a malformed finger, is Raul's current chief bodyguard.

In an interview in 2006, following his assumption of presidential duties, Raúl Castro commented on his public profile stating: "I am not used to making frequent appearances in public, except at times when it is required ... I have always been discreet, that is my way, and in passing I will clarify that I am thinking of continuing in that way."

In an interview with actor Sean Penn, Castro was described as "warm, open, energetic, and sharp of wit." However, Juan Reynaldo Sánchez, a defected bodyguard for Fidel who knew Raúl well, wrote later that his warm public exterior was a carefully maintained façade; in private, he found him to be "rough, curt, almost unpleasant" with a dubious sense of humor. Nevertheless, though, Sánchez considered Raúl the true "architect" of the Castroist system, despite having a polar opposite personality to Fidel. Whereas Fidel was "charismatic, energetic, visionary but extremely impulsive and totally disorganized," Raúl was described as a "natural, methodical, and uncompromising organizer."

After a meeting with Pope Francis in Vatican City on 10 May 2015, Castro said that he would conditionally consider returning to the Roman Catholic Church. He said in a televised news conference, "I read all the Pope's speeches, his commentaries, and if the Pope continues this way, I will go back to praying and go back to the [Roman Catholic] church. I am not joking." The pope visited Cuba before his September 2015 visit to the United States. Castro said: "I promise to go to all his Masses" when Pope Francis visited Cuba in 2015. Castro considered Christ a communist stating, "I think that's why they killed Jesus, for being a communist, for doing what Fidel defined as revolution... changing the situation."

== In popular culture ==
In the 1969 American film Che!, Castro was played by Paul Bertoya. In the 2002 film Fidel, he was played by Maurice Comte. In the 2008 American biographical film Che, he was played by Rodrigo Santoro.He is mentioned as "Fidel Castro's brother" in the Billy Bragg song, "Waiting for the Great Leap Forwards."

== Honours and awards ==
- Cuba
  - Hero of the Republic of Cuba
  - Order of Playa Girón
  - Order of Cienfuegos
- Angola
  - Order of Agostinho Neto (2019)
- China
  - Order of Friendship (18 September 2019)
- Czechoslovakia
  - Military Knight Grand Cross of the Order of the White Lion (13 July 1960)
- Mali
  - Grand Cross of the National Order of Mali
- North Korea
  - Order of the National Flag, 1st class
- Polish People's Republic
  - Order of the Cross of Grunwald, 1st class (1965)
- Russia
  - Order of Friendship (2001)
  - Order of the Holy Prince Daniel of Moscow, 1st class (Russian Orthodox Church)
- Soviet Union
  - Order of Lenin (1978)
  - Order of the October Revolution
  - Jubilee Medal "In Commemoration of the 100th Anniversary of the Birth of Vladimir Ilyich Lenin"
- Ukraine
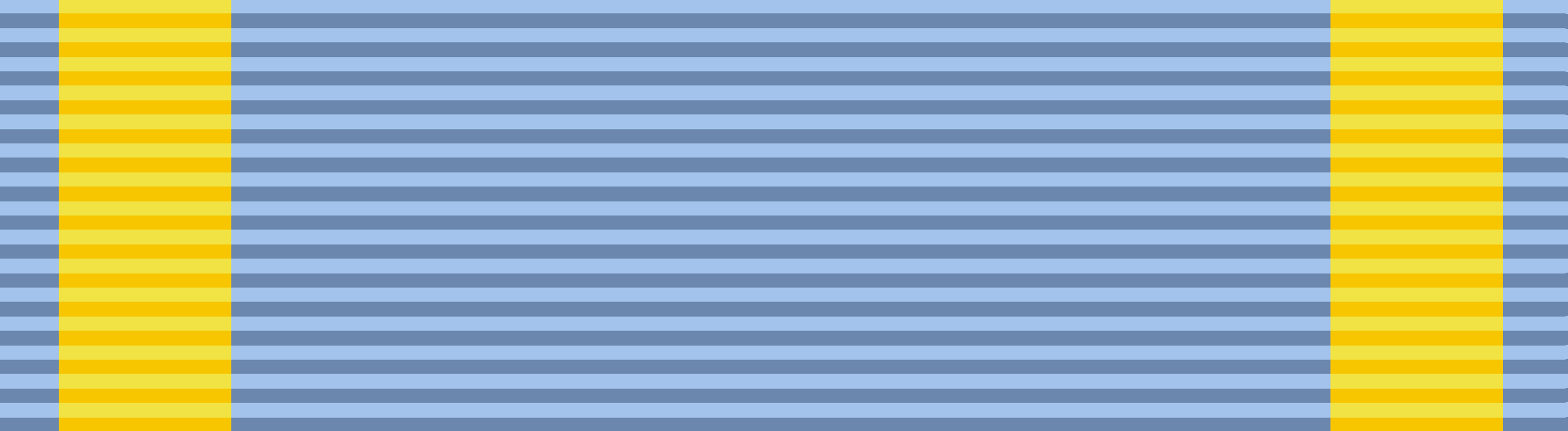
  - First Class of the Order of Prince Yaroslav the Wise (26 March 2010)
- Venezuela
  - Grand Cordon of the Order of the Liberator (2008)
- Vietnam
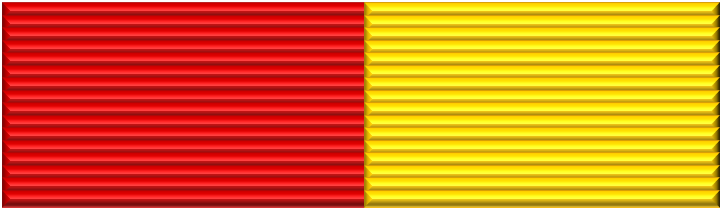
  - Gold Star Order (2018)

== Notes ==
Political offices
New office	Minister of Defence; 1959–2008	Succeeded by Julio Casas Regueiro
New office	First Vice President of Cuba; 1976–2008	Succeeded by José Ramón Machado Ventura
Preceded by Fidel Castro	President of Cuba; Acting: 2006–2008; 2008–2018	Succeeded by Miguel Díaz-Canel
Party political offices
New office	Second Secretary of the Communist Party; 1965–2011	Succeeded by José Ramón Machado Ventura
Preceded by Fidel Castro	First Secretary of the Communist Party; Acting: 2006–2011; 2011–2021	Succeeded by Miguel Díaz-Canel
Military offices
Preceded by Fidel Castro	Commander-in-Chief of the Cuban Revolutionary Armed Forces; Acting: 2006–2008; 2006–2021	Succeeded by Miguel Díaz-Canel
Diplomatic posts
Preceded by Fidel Castro	Secretary-General of the Non-Aligned Movement; 2006–2009	Succeeded by Hosni Mubarak
