= Nicaro Airport =

Former airport in Nicaro, Cuba

- IATA: ICR; ICAO: MUNC

Summary
- Airport type: Public
- Location: Nicaro, Cuba
- Elevation AMSL: 8 m (26 ft)
- Coordinates: 20°41′19″N 075°31′53″W

Map
- Location in Cuba

Runways
Direction	Length		Surface
Direction	m	ft	Surface
	1,800	5,906	dirt

Nicaro Airport (IATA: ICR, ICAO: MUNC) was an airfield serving Nicaro in Cuba.

== Facilities ==
The airport resides at an elevation of 26 ft (7.9 m) above mean sea level. It has one runway which measures 1,800 metres (5,906 ft) in length.

== Former Airbase ==
The airfield was once used by the Cuban Revolutionary Armed Forces, but no military aircraft or buildings exists on the site.

The abandoned airfield once had a single 4314 ft runway.
