= Alina Fernández =

Cuban political critic (born 1956)

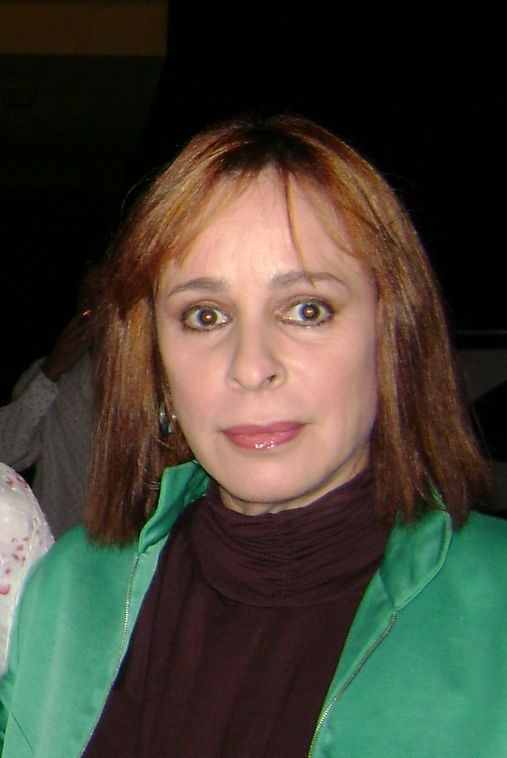
- Fernández in 2008
- Born: 19 March 1956 (age 70); Cuba
- Children: 1
- Parents: Fidel Castro (father); Natalia Revuelta Clews (mother)
- Relatives: Ángel Castro y Argiz (grandfather); Ramón Castro (uncle); Raúl Castro (uncle); Juanita Castro (aunt); Fidel Castro Díaz-Balart (half-brother); Mariela Castro (cousin); Alejandro Castro Espín (cousin)

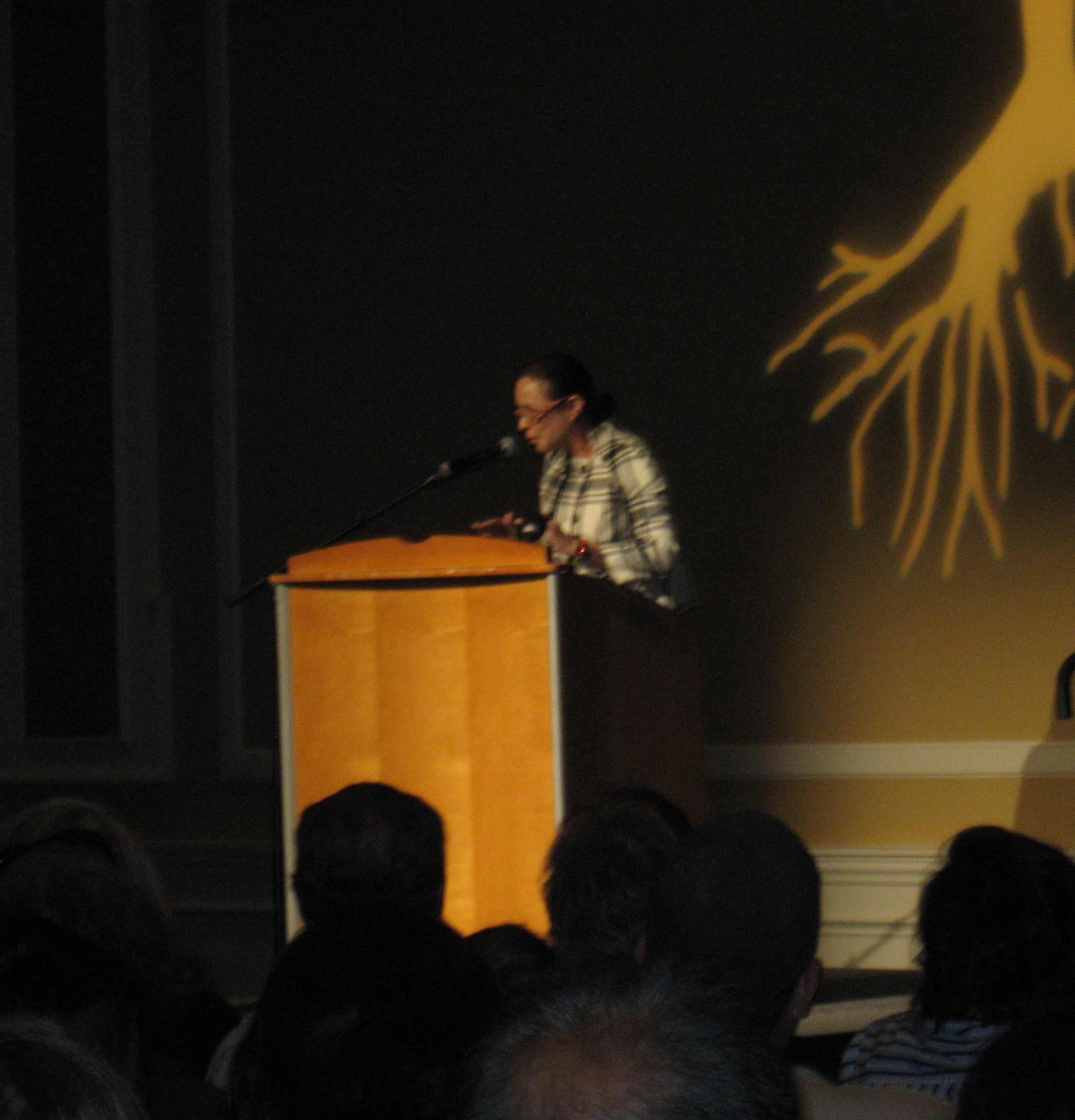
Fernández speaks at Ohio University (2009)

Alina Fernández Revuelta (born 19 March 1956) is a Cuban anti-communist activist. She is the daughter of Fidel Castro and Natalia Revuelta Clews. She is one of the best-known Cuban critics of the government of Cuba and of her father's and uncle's rule. She lived in Cuba until 1993.

== Biography ==
Fernández lived with her mother, Natalia "Naty" Revuelta Clews, who was born in Havana in 1925 and stepfather, Orlando Fernández. In Cuba, she worked as a model and public relations director for a Cuban fashion company, according to the University Program Board. She discovered Fidel Castro, who was considered a family friend, was her father when she was 10 years old when her mother confided to her. She described him as someone who didn’t really know “how to deal with a child” and would sometimes have outbursts. In 1993, at age 37, she left Cuba for Spain using false documents and a wig. Elena Díaz-Verson Amos, a Cuban immigrant, and wife to John Amos (an Aflac, Inc. founder) helped Fernández leave Cuba. Fernández lived in Columbus, Georgia, with Díaz-Verson for several years.

Fernández has one daughter. In an interview in 2008 with Foreign Policy magazine, she said she had been closer to her uncle, Raúl Castro, than she was to her father. She said Raúl Castro, who succeeded her father as the Cuban president, had helped her on several occasions. "He was the person to whom you could go to and ask for help every time you had a practical problem. I personally asked for his help a couple of times, and he always helped me immediately. In the family he was the only help you could find. On these kinds of issues, Fidel was totally unhelpful."

Fernández's aunt, Juanita Castro, sued Fernández for libel and defamation over passages in her autobiography about Juanita and Fidel's parents, Ángel Castro and Lina Ruz. In 2005, a Spanish court ordered Fernández and Plaza & Janes, the Barcelona Random House publisher, to pay US$45,000 to Juanita Castro. Juanita stated: "People who were eating off Fidel's plate yesterday [referring to Alina] come here and want money and power, so they say whatever they want, even if it's not true... Part of my family was responsible for a lot of suffering in Cuba — you can't change that," she said. "But nobody has the right to offend Fidel's family. Insult Fidel — there's plenty to say." An English version, published under the title Castro's Daughter: An Exile's Memoir of Cuba, omits the offending passages. Fernández was the subject of the 2026 documentary Revolution's Daughter, which interviewed her and other Cuban emigres.

== Bibliography ==
- Revuelta, Alina Fernández (1997). Alina: memorias de la hija rebelde de Fidel Castro (in Spanish). Plaza & Janés. ISBN 978-84-01-37585-9.
- Fernandez, Alina; Revuelta, Alina Fernández (October 2002). Una Hoja de Lechuga: Anorexia, una Enfermedad (in Spanish). Plaza & Janes Editories, S.A. ISBN 978-1-4000-0247-4.
