= Nicaro-Levisa =

Nicaro-Levisa (Nicaro / Levisa / Levisa-Nicaro)
- Village
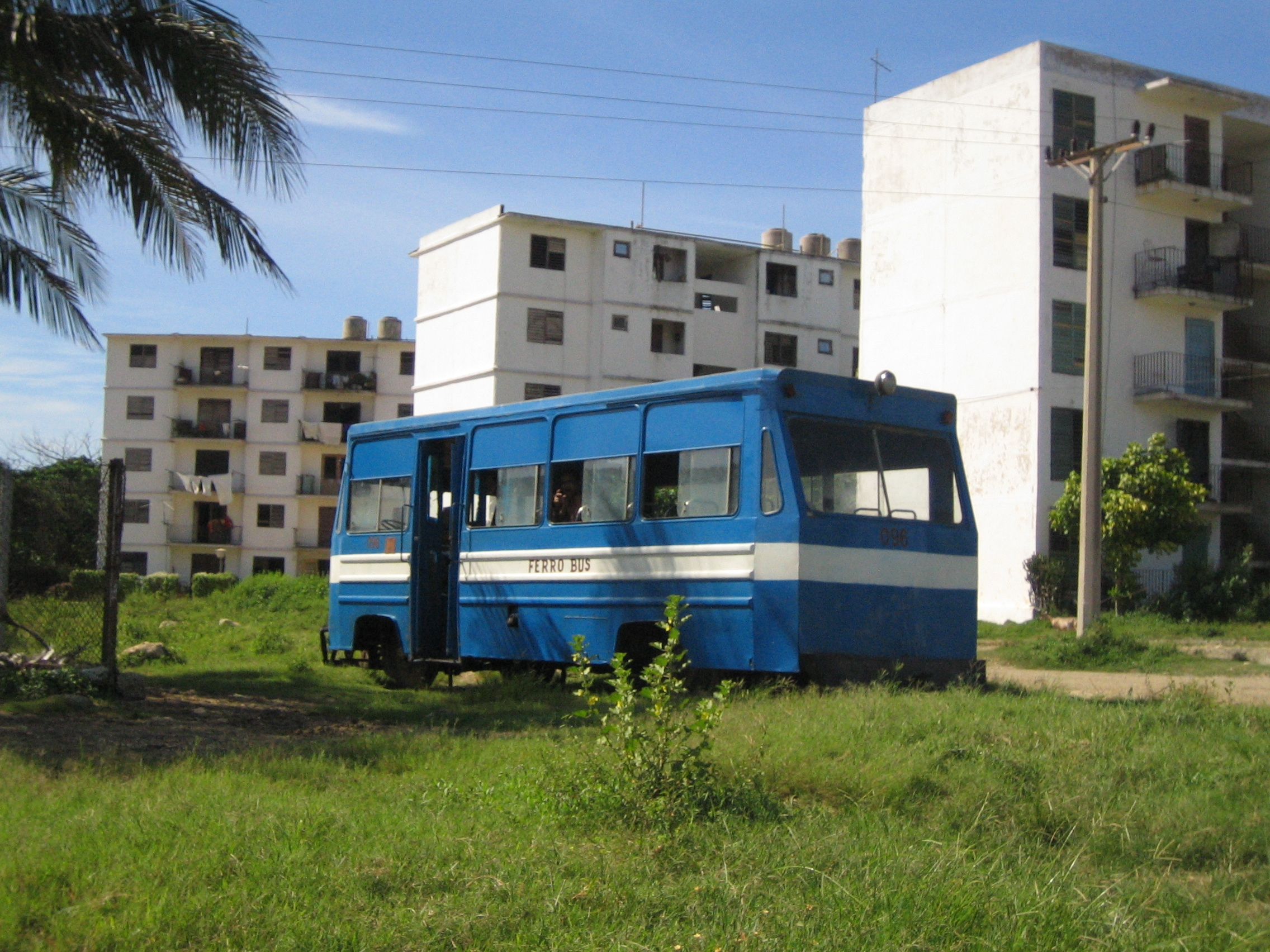

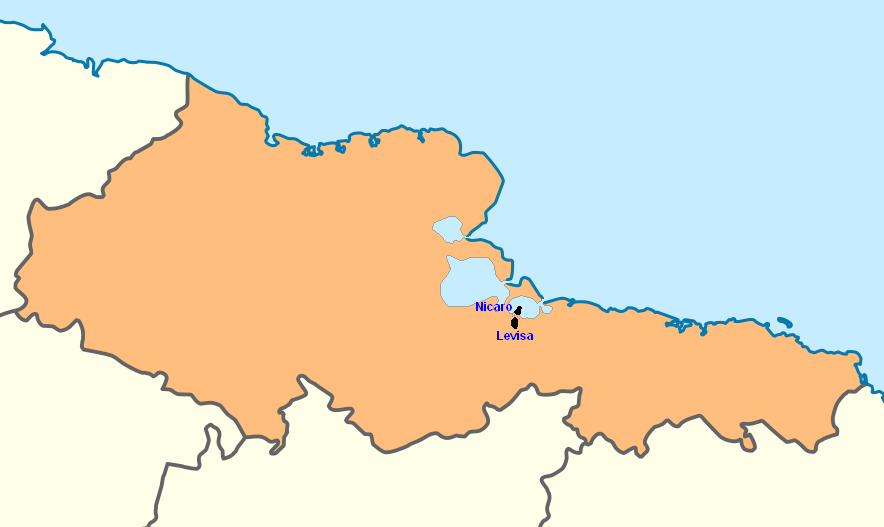
- Location of Nicaro and Levisa within Holguín Province

- Location of Nicaro-Levisa in Cuba
- Coordinates: 20°40′44.4″N 75°32′29.76″W
- Country: Cuba
- Province: Holguín
- Municipality: Mayarí
- Elevation: 8 m (26 ft)

Population (2011)
  - Total: 20,000
- Time zone: UTC-5 (EST)
- Area code: +53-24

Nicaro-Levisa, also Levisa-Nicaro, is a Cuban town and consejo popular ("people's council", i.e. hamlet) of the municipality of Mayarí, in Holguín Province, formed by the settlements of Nicaro and Levisa. With a population of about 20,000, it is the most populated village in the municipality after Mayarí.

== History ==
Nicaro was originally named Lengua de Pajaro, which translated into English means "bird's tongue", due to the shape of its peninsula, as viewed from an air ride.

== Geography ==
Located on Levisa Bay just below Cayo Saetía, and crossed by the River Levisa, Nicaro-Levisa is 10 km (6.2 mi) from Mayarí, 80 km (50 mi) from Moa and about 100 km (62 mi) from Holguín. The town is composed by the settlements of Nicaro (20.7043°N 75.5493°W) and Levisa (20.6650°N 75.5419°W). Nicaro lies on a peninsula in the middle of the bay and Levisa more in the inland, very close to the villages of La Italiana and El Purio. The town is surrounded by the Sierra Cristal mountains, part of the Nipe-Sagua-Baracoa range.

== Transport ==
The principal road serving the town is the national road 123 (Carretera de Mayarí) that links Cueto with Baracoa, at the eastern end of the Carretera Central. It counts a railway serving the open mine named "Mina Martí" (for nickel and cobalt exploitation), and the nickel plant "Comandante René Ramos Latour", located near the airport. Nicaro Airport is a minor airfield located in front of Levisa Bay and the Port of Nicaro lies in the northernmost point of the peninsula.

== See also ==
- Birán
- Guatemala (village)
- List of cities in Cuba
