= Segundo Frente =

- Municipality
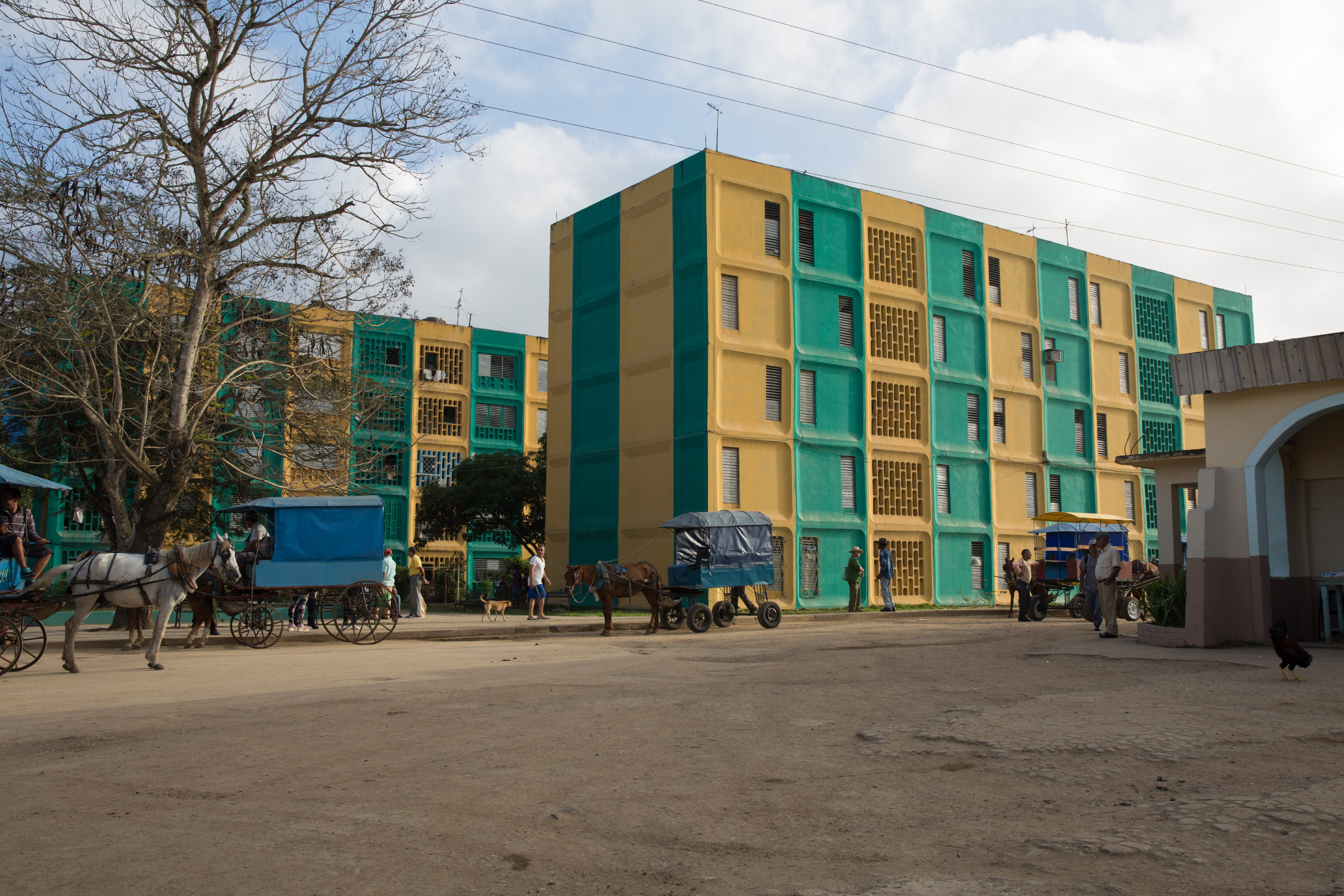
- Apartment buildings in Mayarí Arriba

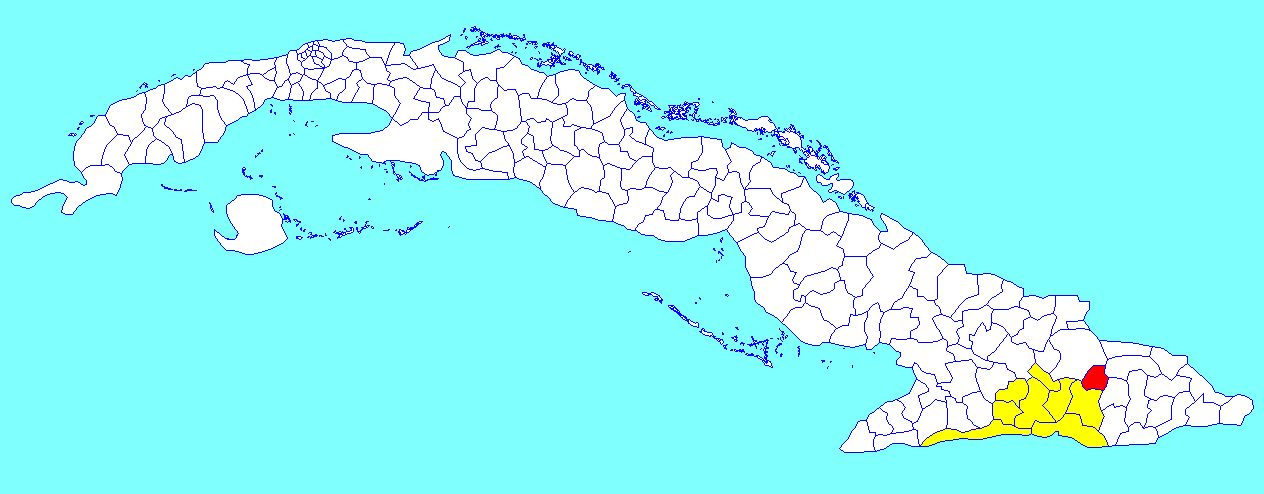
- Segundo Frente municipality (red) within Santiago Province (yellow) and Cuba
- Coordinates: 20°24′43″N 75°31′43″W
- Country: Cuba
- Province: Santiago de Cuba
- Seat: Mayarí Arriba

Area
  - Total: 540.2 km^{2} (208.6 sq mi)
- Elevation: 180 m (590 ft)

Population (2022)
  - Total: 40,196
  - Density: 74.41/km^{2} (192.7/sq mi)
- Time zone: UTC-5 (EST)
- Area code: +53-226
- Website: https://www.segundofrente.gob.cu/

Segundo Frente (Spanish for "Second Front") is a municipality in the Santiago de Cuba Province of Cuba. Located in the northern part of the province, it is centered on the town, and municipal seat, of Mayarí Arriba.

== Geography ==
The municipality is located north of the province, neighboring the provinces of Holguín and Guantánamo; and is partly included into Sierra Cristal National Park's territory. It borders with the municipalities of Mayarí, Frank País, Sagua de Tánamo, El Salvador, Songo-La Maya and San Luis.

It includes the town of Mayarí Arriba and the villages of Boca de Micara, Loma Blanca, Sabanilla, San Benito de Mayarí, Soledad and Tumba Siete.

== Demographics ==
In 2022, the municipality of Segundo Frente had a population of 40,885. With a total area of 540 km^{2} (210 sq mi), it has a population density of 74/km^{2} (190/sq mi).

== See also ==
- List of cities in Cuba
- Municipalities of Cuba
