= Ángel Castro y Argiz =

Spanish-Cuban Farmer, Father of Fidel Castro (1875–1956)

- Anxo Castro e Argiz
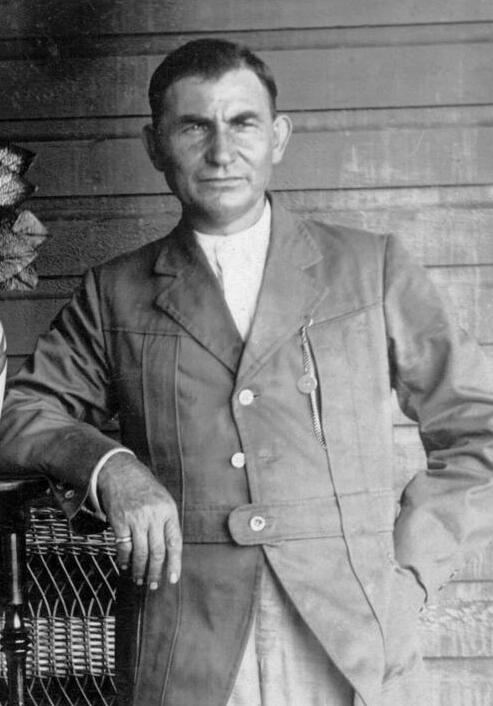
- Castro in 1925
- Born: Ángel María Bautista Castro y Argiz; 5 December 1875; Láncara, Galicia, Kingdom of Spain
- Died: 21 October 1956 (aged 80); Birán, Oriente, Republic of Cuba
- Occupations: Soldier; farmer
- Spouses: María Argota y Reyes (m. 1911, divorced) Lina Ruz González (m. 1943)
- Children: 13, including Ramón, Fidel, Raúl and Juanita
- Relatives: Fidel Castro Díaz-Balart (grandson); Alina Fernández (granddaughter); Mariela Castro (granddaughter); Alejandro Castro Espín (grandson)

Ángel María Bautista Castro y Argiz (Galician: Anxo María Bautista Castro e Argiz; 5 December 1875 – 21 October 1956) was a Galician-born Cuban farmer and businessman who was the father of Cuban revolutionary leaders Fidel, Raúl and Ramón Castro.

== Early life ==
Ángel Castro was born in Láncara, in a small fieldstone house typical of the poor Galician peasants of that time, to Manuel de Castro y Núñez (Láncara, c. 1853 – Láncara, 12 June 1903) and Antonia Argiz y Fernández (Láncara, 1857 – Láncara, 16 November 1887), who had married in Láncara on 16 August 1873. When he was sixteen or seventeen, he was conscripted into the Spanish military, and came to Cuba during the second War of Independence. He was stationed in the tract of land between Júcaro and Morón.

Following the Spanish defeat in 1898, Castro went with the army back to Spain and returned to Láncara. A cavalryman in the Spanish Army with no future he finally decided having fought for Spanish Cuba to emigrate to Cuba through the port of Havana in 1905, shortly after an uncle had done so. He arrived in 1906 with his brother Pedro "And without a cent he started to work, being infuriated of the American control of the former Spanish colony" Fidel remarked in one of many interviews later in life.

At first Castro went to work in the nickel mines near Santiago de Cuba, where a capacity for hard labour led him to become a labourer for the Nipe Bay Railway Company, which was building the Preston sugar mill. He made his way eastwards to Oriente province, where laborers worked in a hostile and mountainous region 500 miles from Havana. Working for a subsidiary of the American United Fruit Company directing the loading of sugar wagons had some compensations. At this time, American plantations in misiones were spreading throughout Cuba, and workers were being hired to cut down the hardwood forests and plant sugarcane. Castro organized a group of men and hired them out to United Fruit selling lemonade from a dealer's cart. Later he set up a shop in the town of Guaro selling equipment and supplies to the cane workers. The profits enabled him to leave the employ of United Fruits. He hired immigrant labour to load up wagons and fell timber. With the help of benefactor, Fidel Pino, he opened a restaurant in Guaro fittingly called Progress, but it was not a success, and at last was forced to close. In 1910 he became the joint owner of a mine called The Desire, just one of a number of capital deals in land, livestock and timber businesses that made Castro's name in Cuba.

== The businessman Don Ángel ==
In 1914 he started a business with immigrants employed as woodcutters, selling trees. With their experience he began to make contact with Americans with the intention of purchasing some land, initially just 200 acres. The farm purchased at Biran was small at first, so in the dead of night he would move the boundary posts nearer the road and railway lines. He farmed sheep and poultry, which he sheltered under a house he built on stilts like those in Galicia. It had a wide veranda and large rooms. The land was suitable for sugar cane, but he also planted maize, kept poultry, and later cattle. He soon came to preside over a finca called Manacas which had its own stores, slaughterhouse and bakery. There were a total of 27 buildings, among them: the school, the teacher's house, cockpit, movie theatre, store, bar, billiard, telegraph post office, workshop, Haitians’ house, and drugstore. Neighbors who failed to pay their debts might find themselves boxing for their lives in the Cockpit.

With a strong sense of business he was, despite no religious convictions, a strong-minded, but fair father. Still, he was sorely tried by his sons' bad behaviour at school. Because of this, he decided to send Fidel away to get an education at Dolores Primary school. Ángel had a strong sense of obligation, was taciturn and hard working, but had begun life illiterate. He was therefore determined to educate his children with the money he had earned. They were brought up in the countryside on a rough agricultural ranch, that gave his son Fidel a resilient outlook.

Ángel Castro once had 500 Haitians working for him, and at the time of his death 400 Haitians on the estate. Castro prospered and was eventually able to buy 1800 hectares and lease a further 10,000 hectares of land which yielded pine wood, livestock, and sugarcane. It is said that this prosperity was due in part to harsh treatment of his mostly Haitian workers, and various illegal exploits. Although perhaps slightly inaccurate in detail, there is a vivid description of late 1920s life, especially in reference to the plight of Haitian contract labour at Antilla and Banes in Bancroft in the northern part of what was then Oriente province. Later in life Fidel recalled his father's corruption, buying votes from the existing political classes, but by the standards of the day he was probably less harsh than many proprietors. During the winter he would hire redundant workers from neighbouring plantations to weed the ground. He was an obeisant man, kind to his children, spoiled them even, and rarely lost his temper, except at dominoes. By the 1950s Ángel was worth about $500,000 (equivalent to $6,000,000 in 2025). Despite being a successful capitalist, Castro hated the Americans for their conquest of Cuba's independence movement in 1898. From a sincerely conservative peasant family, Catholic by tradition, if not in practice, he harboured suspicions of extravagant luxury and American-style capitalism that he inculcated into his children.

== Family ==
Ángel Castro married María Argota y Reyes on 25 March 1911, with whom he had five children: Manuel Castro Argota (1913–1914), María Lila Perfidia (Lidia) Castro Argota (1913–1991), Pedro Emilio Castro Argota (1914–1992), Antonia María Dolores Castro Argota (1915–1920) and Georgina de la Caridad Castro Argota (born 1918). He and his wife had contrasting personalities. Dubbed "Maria the wealthy" by her family, she wanted to buy expensive clothes and gold jewellery and live in style in Santiago City. By contrast, Ángel preferred to go climbing in the hills and the outdoors looking for new land.

The Ruz González family arrived in 1917 from Pinar del Río in west Cuba. Ángel's friendship grew with Perfecto Ruz Vásquez who introduced him to his niece Lina Ruz González. She was 15 years old and employed as a maid in his household. She loved to go horse riding. He had seven more children, including Fidel, by Lina, whom he made his cook. Born in Catalina, Guane, Pinar del Río Province, Cuba on 23 September 1903, she was the daughter of Francisco Ruz Vázquez (1874–1961), a cart dealer transporting cane to the mills, and by Dominga González Ramos. They married in 1943, following the birth of their children: Ángela María Castro Ruz (1923–2012), Ramón Eusebio Castro Ruz (1924–2016), Fidel Alejandro Castro Ruz (1926–2016), Raúl Modesto Castro Ruz (born 1931), Juana de la Caridad "Juanita" Castro Ruz (1933–2023), Emma de la Concepción Castro Ruz (born 1935) and Agustina del Carmen Castro Ruz (1938–2017). Ángel Castro also had other son, Martin Castro (1930–2017), with the farmhand Generosa Mendoza. The eldest (Ramón) took on the ranch. The girls learned to play the guitar and dance. As children they learned to swim and celebrated New Year's Eve with a turkey dinner.

Castro y Argiz died in the village of Birán, 42 days before his son Fidel landed in Los Cayuelos on 2 December 1956. He died of an gastrointestinal hemorrhage at the age of 80. Fidel Castro is said to have received the news of his father's death in stoic silence. His wife, Lina, lies buried next to him at Birán.

== Sources ==
- Castro, Juanita (2009). Fidel y Raul – Mis Hermanos, La Historia Secreta. As told to María Antonieta Collins. Santillana USA Publishing Company, Inc. ISBN 978-1-60396-701-3.
