= Natalia Revuelta Clews =

Cuban socialite (1925-2015)

- Born: December 6, 1925
- Died: February 27, 2015 (aged 89); Havana, Cuba
- Spouse: Orlando Fernández (1948–1959)
- Partner: Fidel Castro (1955–1959)
- Children: Alina Fernández; Natalie “Nina” Fernández

Natalia Revuelta Clews (December 6, 1925 – February 27, 2015) was a Cuban socialite, mistress of Fidel Castro, and mother of his daughter Alina Fernández. Both Revuelta and Castro were married to other people.

== Biography ==
She was active in the Cuban opposition movement following Fulgencio Batista's coup in 1952 and, after being introduced to him, donated money and actively aided Castro and his movement.

Following the birth of her daughter in 1956 and Castro's return from exile in Mexico, Revuelta supported the Cuban revolution but did not continue a relationship with him.
