= Alejandro Castro Espín =

Cuban political and military figure

- Born: 29 July 1965 (age 60); Havana, Cuba
- Political party: Communist Party of Cuba
- Parents: Raúl Castro (father); Vilma Espín (mother)
- Relatives: Mariela Castro (sister); Ángel Castro y Argiz (grandfather); Fidel Castro (uncle); Ramón Castro (uncle); Juanita Castro (aunt); Alina Fernández (cousin); Fidel Castro Díaz-Balart (cousin)

Alejandro Castro Espín (born 29 July 1965) is a Cuban political and military figure. He holds the rank of Brigadier General in the Interior Ministry of Cuba. He is the only son of Raúl Castro, the former First Secretary of the Communist Party of Cuba, and Vilma Espín, one of the main leaders of the Cuban Revolution; he is a nephew of Fidel Castro.

== Biography ==
Alejandro was born on 29 July 1965. He is the only son of the marriage between Raúl Castro and Vilma Espín (1930–2007), and brother of Deborah, Mariela and Nilsa. His sister Mariela is one of the country's most prominent sexologists, and also director of the National Center for Sex Education in Cuba.

He participated in the Cuban contingent sent by his government to the Angolan Civil War, and although he did not fight on the front line, he had an accidental injury to an eye (no eye loss) during a military exercise in Luanda, Angola. This injury earned him the nickname "The One-Eyed" (Spanish: El Tuerto) among Cuban dissidents.

Alejandro Castro is an engineer and has a master's degree in international relations. He has also been highlighted as a researcher on issues related to defense and national security.

Since his father, Raúl Castro, came to power, Alejandro has become personal assistant to the president and been involved in various political events and official visits, which has increased speculation about the possibility that he is Castro's successor as head of the Cuban regime. He regularly writes articles in the Cuban press, and in 2009 he presented his first book, El Imperio del Terror (English: The Empire of Terror), published by the publishing house of the Cuban Interior Ministry, which explains his particular vision of the United States' interests of power in the nineteenth and twentieth centuries.
