= Cayo Saetía =

- Resort island and village
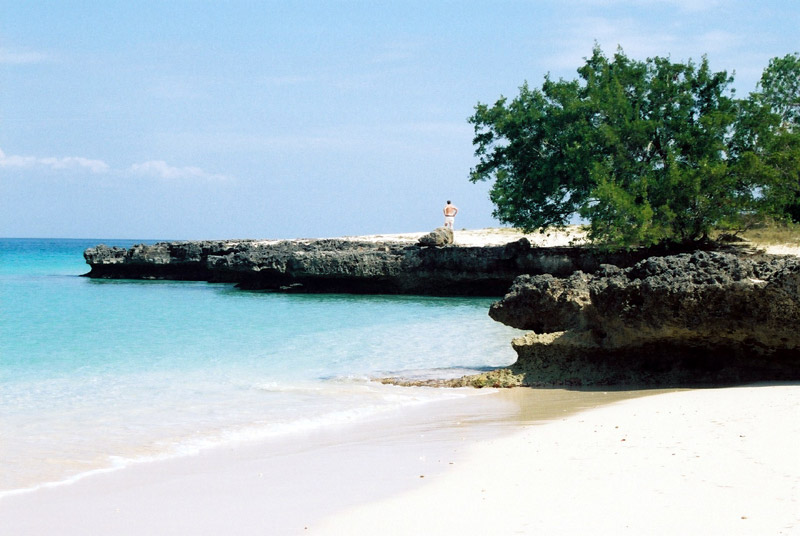
- Beach on Cayo Saetía

- Location of Cayo Saetía in Cuba
- Coordinates: 20°45′34″N 75°31′15″W
- Country: Cuba
- Province: Holguín
- Municipality: Mayarí
- Elevation: 4 m (13 ft)
- Time zone: UTC-5 (EST)
- Area code: +53-24

Cayo Saetía (also spelled Sae-Tía) is a 42 km^{2} (16 sq mi) cay (island) in Holguín Province, Cuba. It belongs to the municipality of Mayarí.

== Overview ==
It is located 120 km (75 mi) southeast of Holguín between the Bay of Nipe & the Atlantic Ocean. The landmass is connected to the mainland by an animal control bridge. Once a private government game reserve, it now houses a resort managed by the Grupo de Turismo Gaviota, S.A. and a Cuban Youth camp. The closest major town is Mayarí, located 20 km (12 mi) south-east. The environment is mixed open plains and forest with swamp in the northwest sector. It has been stocked with zebra, water buffalo, boar and various antelope and deer species which roam freely on the cay. Horses and cattle also share some of the grazing area. A camel, several ostriches and parrots live near the resort compound.

The resort is a Three Star rated premises with a restaurant. Self-exploration is prohibited but Jeep tours of the reserve are available. Resorts in the Guardalavaca tourist area offer helicopter and boat tours to the cayo for safaris and its white sand beaches. The island used to be the private holiday home of Fidel Castro and family, until 1994 when they stopped coming. The grass plain is still visible on the island from where the family would arrive and depart by helicopter.

== See also ==
- Nicaro-Levisa
