= Mayarí =

- Municipality
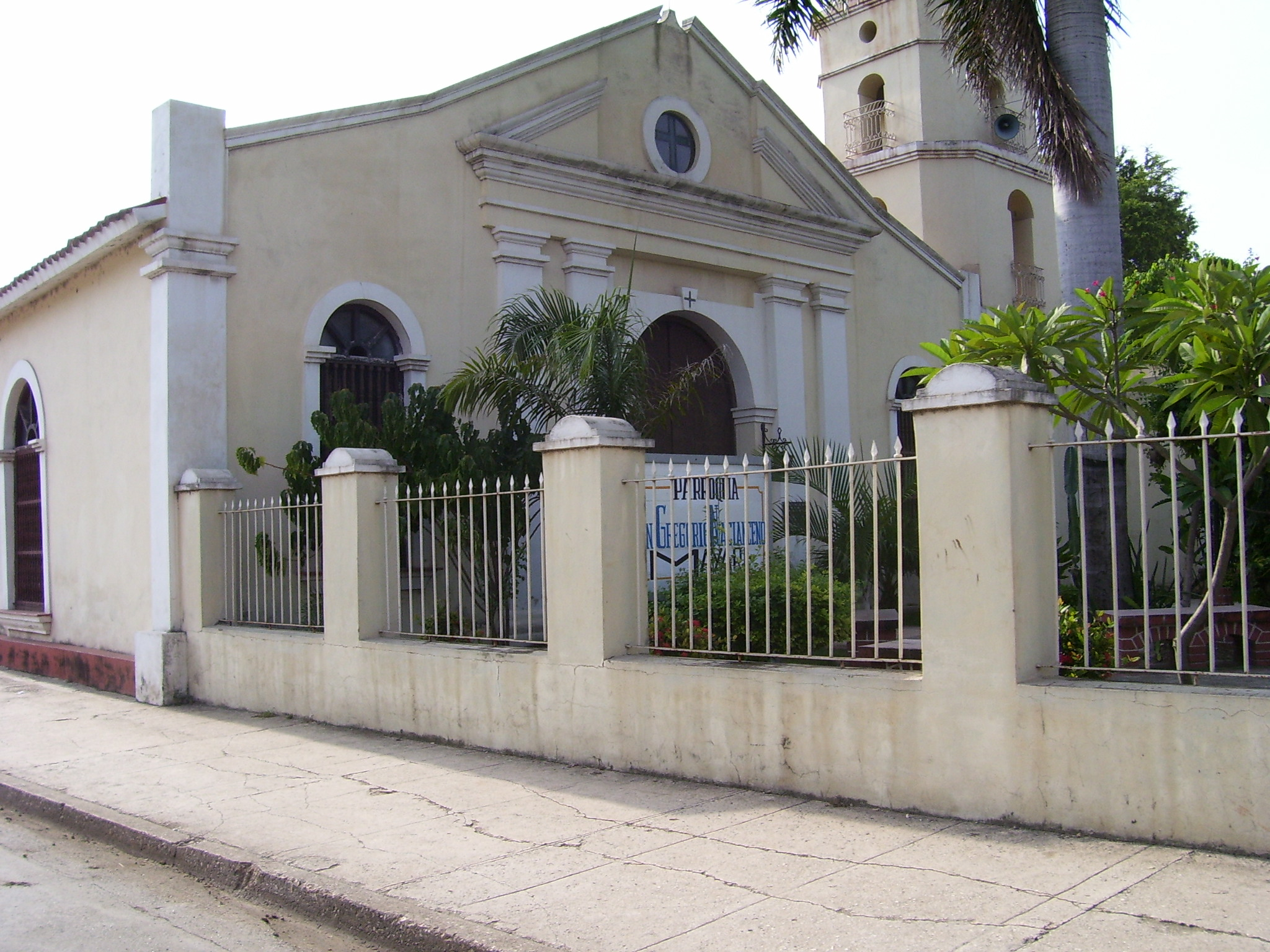
- San Gregorio Nacianceno church

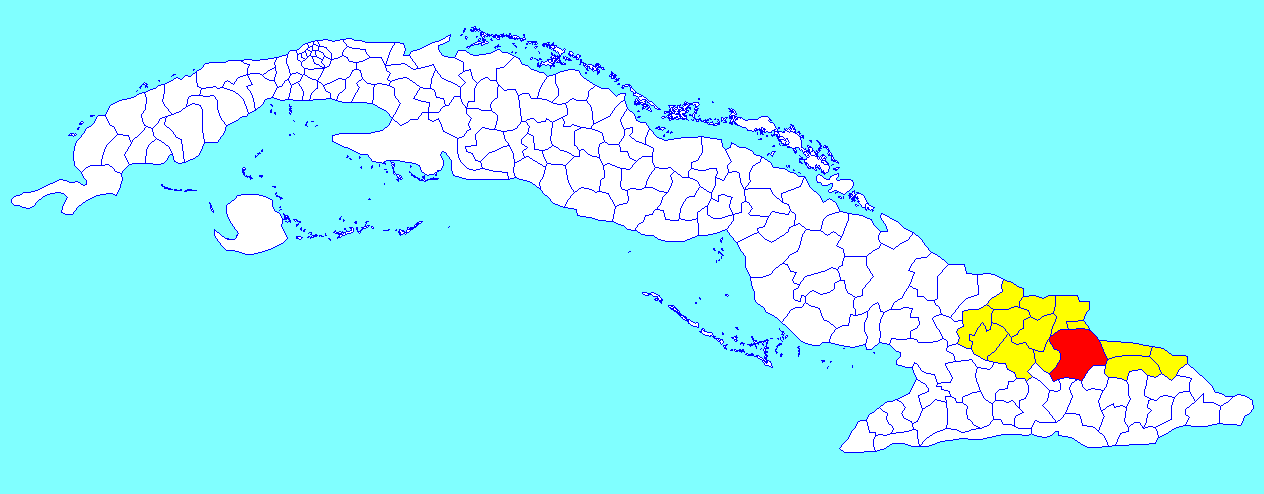
- Mayarí municipality (red) within Holguín Province (yellow) and Cuba
- Coordinates: 20°39′33″N 75°40′41″W
- Country: Cuba
- Province: Holguín
- Founded: 1757
- Established: January 19, 1879 (Municipality)

Area
  - Total: 1,307 km^{2} (505 sq mi)
- Elevation: 15 m (49 ft)

Population (2022)
  - Total: 92,792
  - Density: 71.00/km^{2} (183.9/sq mi)
- Time zone: UTC-5 (EST)
- Area code: +53-24

Mayarí is a municipality and town in the Holguín Province of Cuba.

== History ==
The origins of the city date back to 1757 in Spanish Cuba, when the first farms were established here by immigrant colonists. On 19 January 1879 the city became the seat of Mayarí Municipality.

== Geography ==
The municipality is divided into the barrios and hamlets of Barajagua, Cabonico, Cajimaya, Chavaleta Norte, Chavaleta Sur, Guayabo, Juan Vicente, Mateo Sánchez, Punta de Tabaco, Río Frío, Sae-Tía, San Gregario Norte, San Gregorio Sur and Santa Isabel. Birán, the birthplace of Fidel and Raúl Castro, was part of Mayarí until the 1976 reform, when it became part of the neighboring Cueto municipality.

Among other barrios or neighborhoods in this municipality are: Felton (on Cajimaya Bay, once the seaport for the Bethlehem Cuba Iron Mines Company -Bethlehem Steel-), Guaro, Guatemala (on Nipe Bay, previously named Preston and a central sugar mill operated by the United Fruit Company), Nicaro-Levisa (on Levisa Bay, originally named Lengua de Pajaro which translated into English means bird's tongue -as viewed from an air ride-), El Purio, Santa Rita, La Italiana, Mandinga. The last two being on the road to the open mines named Mina Martí where nickel and cobalt exploitation started in the beginnings of the twentieth century by Bethlehem Cuba Iron Mines Company (Bethlehem Steel) and Nicaro Nickel Company.

== Demographics ==
In 2022, the municipality of Mayarí had a population of 92,792. With a total area of 1,307 km^{2} (505 sq mi), it has a population density of 71/km^{2} (180/sq mi).

== Main sights ==
The Sierra Cristal National Park (Spanish: Parque Nacional Sierra Cristal) is partly located in the Mayarí Municipality and partly in neighboring Sagua de Tánamo Municipality. Other attractions include Cayo Saetía, a scenic cay with beaches located within the municipality on the Bay of Nipe, north of the Mayarí city.

== Popular culture ==
The city's name Mayarí is in the 1940s song "Voy para Mayarí" ("I'm going to Mayarí"), by Compay Segundo, and in his song "Chan Chan" on the Buena Vista Social Club album.

It also appears in the song “Las Mujeres de Mayarí” (“The women of Mayarí”) in the same album.

== See also ==
- Municipalities of Cuba
- List of cities in Cuba
