= Circuito Sur =

Highway in Cuba

Coordinates: 22°48′39.8″N 82°45′40.8″W

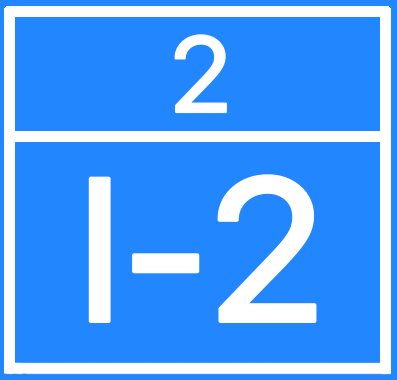
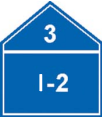
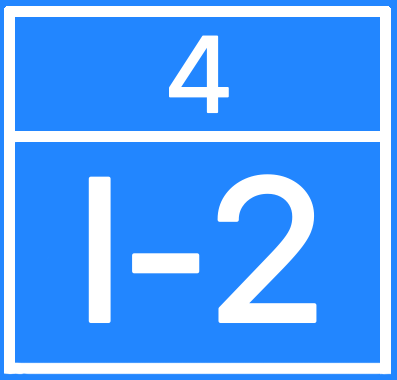
2–I–2 / 3–I–2 / 4–I–2 Circuito Sur (CS)
- Southern Circuit
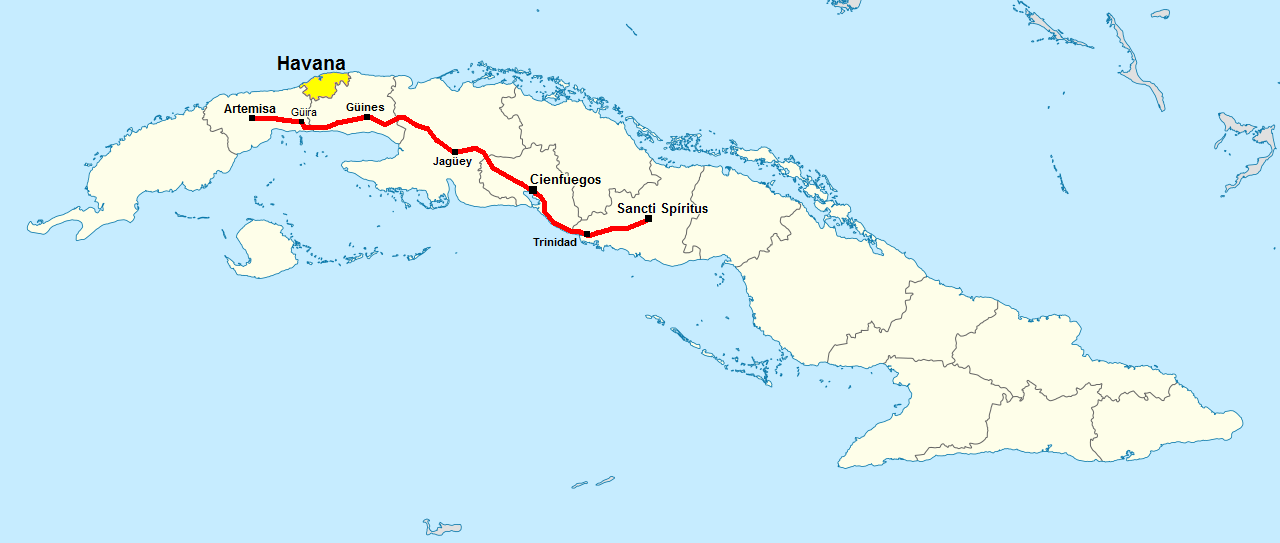

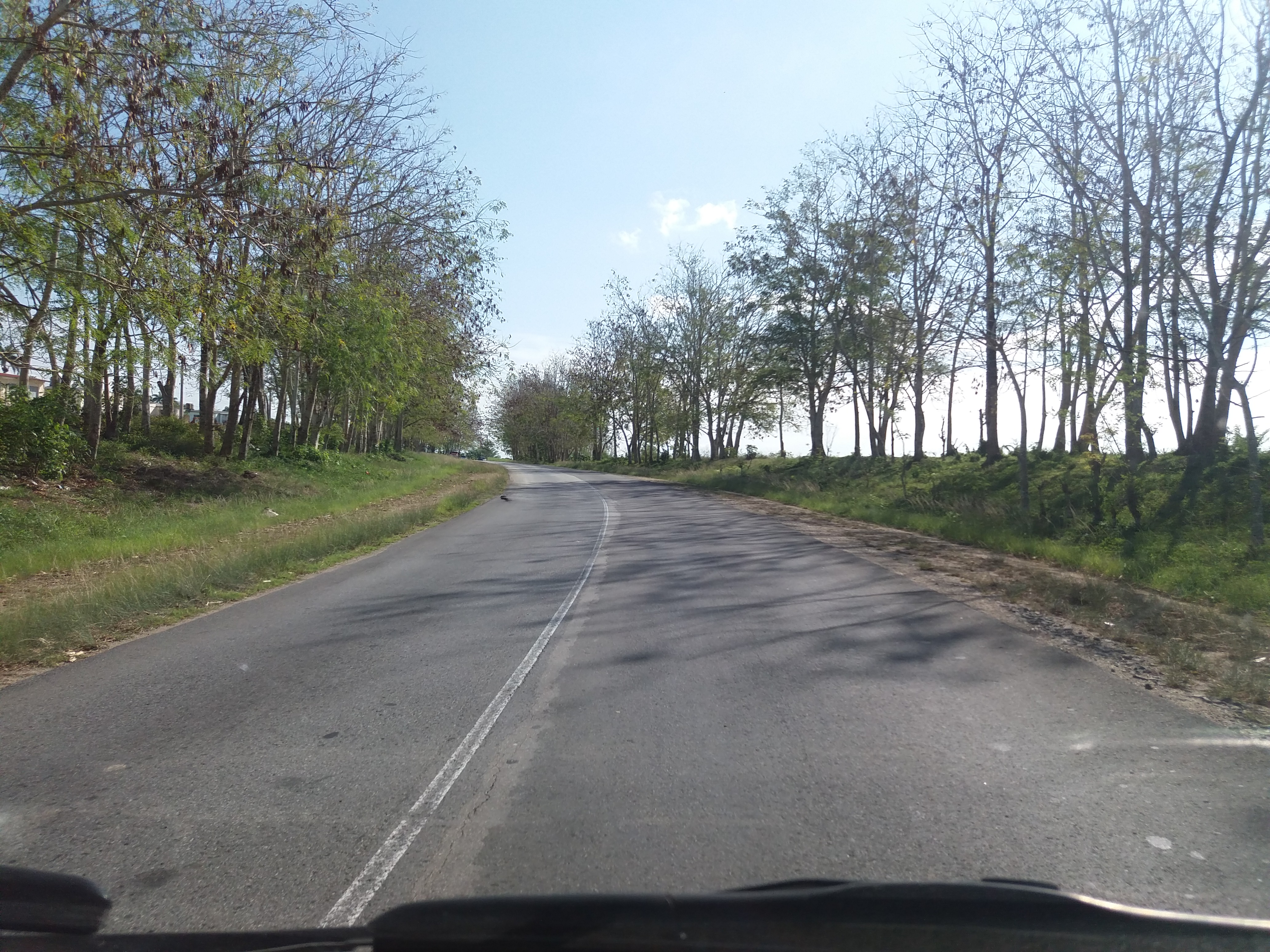
- The CS between Caunao and Lagunillas

Route information
- Length: 491 km (305 mi)

2–I–2
- East end: 2–720 near Melena del Sur
- Major intersections: 2–890 in Güines; A1 near Vegas
- West end: 3–I–2 near Cabezas

3–I–2
- East end: 2–I–2 near Cabezas
- Major intersections: 3–202 near Crimea; 3–I–16 in Jaguey Grande; 3–252 near Manguito
- West end: 4–I–2

4–I–2
- East end: 3–I–2 in Amarillas
- Major intersections: A1 near Aguada de Pasajeros; 4–I–16 in Real Campiña; 4–I–22 Yaguaramas; Circuito Sur Bypass near Yaguaramas; 4–112 in Cienfuegos; Carretera Nueva a La Sierpe near Sancti Spíritus
- West end: Road to Las Nuevas in Jíbaro

Location
- Country: Cuba
- Major cities: Artemisa, Güira de Melena, Batabanó, Güines, Jagüey Grande, Aguada de Pasajeros, Cienfuegos, Trinidad, Sancti Spíritus

Highway system
- Roads in Cuba

The Circuito Sur (CS), meaning "Southern Circuit", is a west–east highway connecting Artemisa to Sancti Spíritus, through the southern and coastal side of central-western Cuba. With a length of 491 km, it is the third-longest Cuban highway after the "Carretera Central" and the "Circuito Norte". The road is numbered I–2, with it being split into 2–I–2, 3–I–2, and 4–I–2 depending on the province.

== Route ==
=== General Description ===
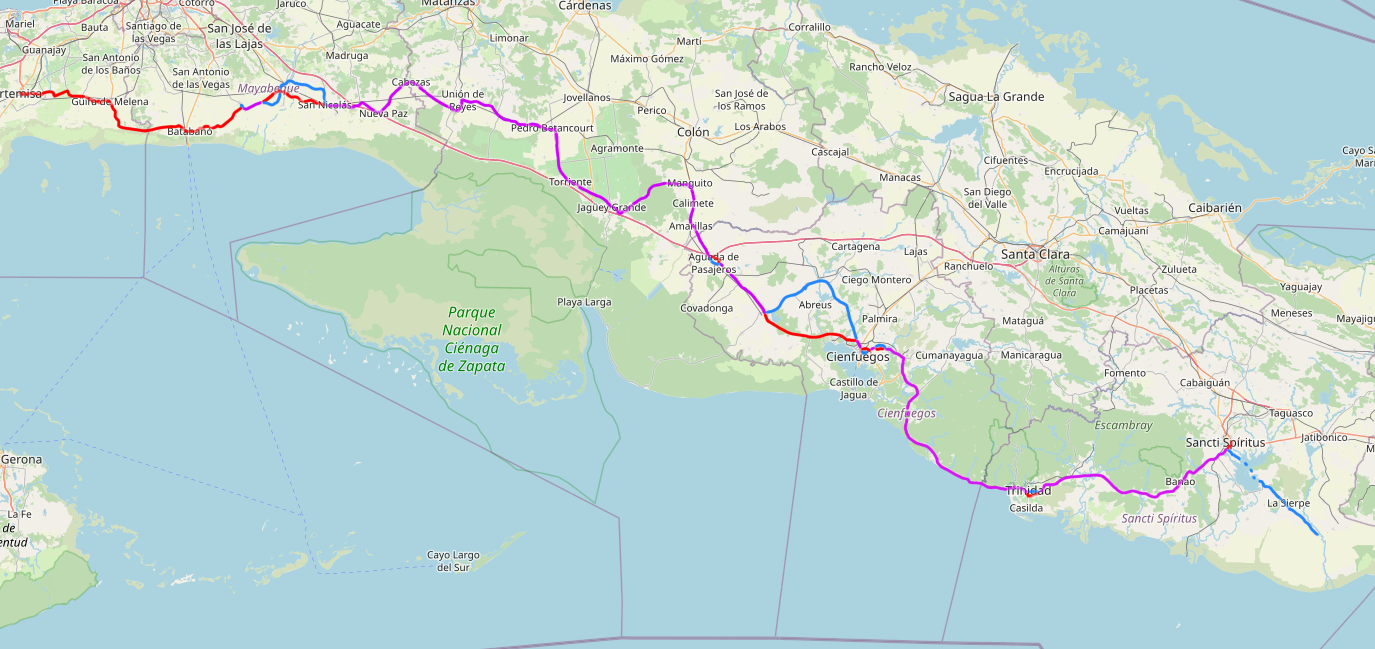
Highway I–2, the original road, seen in blue while the road commonly known as the Circuito Sur is seen in red, with shared sections in purple, and unusable sections are in a dotted line

The CS starts in Artemisa, capital of the homonym province, and crosses the provinces of Mayabeque, Matanzas, Cienfuegos and Sancti Spíritus, ending in the city of Sancti Spíritus. The highway goes along the Caribbean Coast in some areas and both endpoints cross the Carretera Central. The highway had gotten many bypasses that go around towns and that divert from the original I-2, which starts south of the town Melena del Sur in Mayabeque Province, and continues in the same general route until the city Sancti Spiritus, where it then goes southeast, through the now closed section in the Zaza Reservoir, and then continues until the town of Jibaro.

=== 2-I-2 ===
The beginning of the I-2 is just south of the town of Melena del Sur, on junction with Highway 2-720 and Calle 26, as the 2-I-2, where it goes east, passing just south of Güines and through the town of San Nicolás de Bari, until its interchange with the A1 motorway. After it enters the towns of Vegas, Nueva Paz, and Palos. After, it enters Matanzas Province and continues as 3-I-2.

=== 3-I-2 ===
The 3-I-2 starts from the 2-I-2 from Mayabeque Province to Matanzas Province. The road enters the towns of Cabezas, Alacranes, Unión de Reyes, Bolondron, Pedro Betancourt, Torriente, and Jagüey Grande. After, it has a two way exit to the A1 motorway westbound. After it goes to the town of Reynold García, and then goes south to the town of Amarillas, where it continues as the 4-I-2.

=== 4-I-2 ===
After the town of Amarillas in Matanzas Province, the 3-I-2 continues into the 4-I-2, which then goes southeast to the interchange with the A1 motorway and into the town of Aguada de Pasajeros. The original 4-I-2 passes through the center of the town as Calle Maximo Gomez, while there is a new bypass going around the northern side of the town considered to be the current Circuito Sur. It then continues southeast through the towns of Real Campina and Yaguaramas, where after the new Circuito Sur bypass and the 4-I-2 split again. The bypass goes directly to the city of Cienfuegos, while the 4-I-2 goes through several towns to get there. The 4-I-2 goes northeast to the town of Rodas, then back southeast through Ariza and back in Cienfuegos. The bypass route then takes the Cienfuegos Beltway, while the 4-I-2 goes through Calle 63 and Calzada de Dolores (Calle 64), where they then split again in Caunao, with the bypass going south of the community, and the 4-I-2 going through Avenida 64 in the middle of the community. Then the roads rejoin and continue into the towns of San Anton and Arimao, until it reaches Trinidad and the bypass route goes south of the town, while the 4-I-2 goes through Calle Santo Domingo (Camilo Cienfuegos) and Calle de las Chanzonetas, where they rejoin northeast to Sancti Spiritus, and the town of Banao. Reaching the city of Sancti Spiritus, the new route goes directly to end in the Carretera Central (4-N-1), while the 4-I-2 goes southeast towards the Zaza Reservoir, with part of it now submerged under the reservoir, after the reservoir, it continues into the towns of La Ferroiana and La Sierpe, where it ends in the town of Jibaro.

=== Table ===
The table below shows the route of the Circuito Sur. Note: Provincial seats are shown in bold; the names shown under brackets in the section "Municipality" indicate the municipal seats.

The numbered route shows the number of the section of the road in each town, with the number before representing the zone the section of road is located in.

Settlement	Municipality	Province	Numbered Route
**Artemisa**	(Artemisa)	Artemisa	2–12
Las Cañas	Artemisa	Artemisa	2–12
Dagame	Alquizar	Artemisa	2–12
Bajerano	Alquizar	Artemisa	2–12
Alquizar	(Alquizar)	Artemisa	2–12
Mallorquín	Alquizar	Artemisa	2–12
Güira de Melena	(Güira de Melena)	Artemisa	2–200
La Tinaja	Güira de Melena	Artemisa	2–200
Boca Cajío (to Playa Cajío)	Güira de Melena	Artemisa	2–200
Chafarina	Güira de Melena	Artemisa	2–200
Camacho	Batabanó	Mayabeque	2–200
Pedroso	Batabanó	Mayabeque	2–200
Batabanó (to Surgidero)	(Batabanó)	Mayabeque	2-200 / 2–720
Monte	Melena del Sur	Mayabeque	2–720
Melena del Sur	(Melena del Sur)	Mayabeque	2–720
Lechuga	Melena del Sur	Mayabeque	2-I-2
Güines	(Güines)	Mayabeque	2-I-2
Vizarrón	Güines	Mayabeque	2-I-2
Río Seco (crossroad)	Güines	Mayabeque	2-I-2
San Nicolás de Bari	(San Nicolás de Bari)	Mayabeque	2-I-2
Hector Molina	San Nicolás de Bari	Mayabeque	2-I-2
Vegas	Nueva Paz	Mayabeque	2-I-2
Nueva Paz	(Nueva Paz)	Mayabeque	2-I-2
Palos	Nueva Paz	Mayabeque	2-I-2
Manuel Isla	Nueva Paz	Mayabeque	2-I-2
La Esperanza	Nueva Paz	Mayabeque	2-I-2
Cabezas	Unión de Reyes	Matanzas	2-I-2
Bermeja	Unión de Reyes	Matanzas	3-I-2
Alacranes	Unión de Reyes	Matanzas	3-72 / 3-I-2
Unión de Reyes	(Unión de Reyes)	Matanzas	3-72 / 3-I-2
Bolondrón	Pedro Betancourt	Matanzas	3-I-2
Güira de Macurijes	Pedro Betancourt	Matanzas	3-I-2
Navajas	Pedro Betancourt	Matanzas	3-I-2
Pedro Betancourt	(Pedro Betancourt)	Matanzas	3-I-2
Camilo Cienfuegos	Pedro Betancourt	Matanzas	3-I-2
Torriente	Jagüey Grande	Matanzas	3-I-2
Crimea	Jagüey Grande	Matanzas	3-I-2
Jagüey Grande	(Jagüey Grande)	Matanzas	3-I-2
Raíz del Jobo	Jagüey Grande	Matanzas	3-I-2
Reynold García	Calimete	Matanzas	3-I-2
Manguito	Calimete	Matanzas	3-I-2
Calimete	(Calimete)	Matanzas	3-I-2
Amarillas	Calimete	Matanzas	3-I-2
Aguada de Pasajeros	(Aguada de Pasajeros)	Cienfuegos	4-I-2
Primero de Mayo (crossroad)	Aguada de Pasajeros	Cienfuegos	4-I-2
Real Campiña (to Covadonga)	Aguada de Pasajeros	Cienfuegos	4-I-2
Guayabales	Aguada de Pasajeros	Cienfuegos	4-I-2
Yaguaramas	Abreus	Cienfuegos	4-I-2
Constancia (crossroad)	Abreus	Cienfuegos	4-I-2
Paraíso	Cienfuegos	Cienfuegos	4-I-2
**Cienfuegos**	(Cienfuegos)	Cienfuegos	4-I-2
Guaos	Cienfuegos	Cienfuegos	4-I-2
Pepito Tey	Cienfuegos	Cienfuegos	4-I-2
San Antón	Cienfuegos	Cienfuegos	4-I-2
Arimao	Cienfuegos	Cienfuegos	4-I-2
La Sierrita (crossroad)	Cienfuegos	Cienfuegos	4-I-2
Gavilán	Cienfuegos	Cienfuegos	4-I-2
Guajimico	Cienfuegos	Cienfuegos	4-I-2
San Juan	Cienfuegos	Cienfuegos	4-I-2
Camilo Cienfuegos	Cienfuegos	Cienfuegos	4-I-2
Playa Yaguanabo	Cienfuegos	Cienfuegos	4-I-2
Caleta de Muñoz	Cienfuegos	Cienfuegos	4-I-2
La Boca	Trinidad	Sancti Spíritus	4-I-2
Piti Fajardo	Trinidad	Sancti Spíritus	4-I-2
Trinidad	(Trinidad)	Sancti Spíritus	4-I-2
El Vallecito	Trinidad	Sancti Spíritus	4-I-2
Manaca Iznaga (Valle de los Ingenios)	Trinidad	Sancti Spíritus	4-I-2
Crucero de Bandomo (to FNTA)	Trinidad	Sancti Spíritus	4-I-2
Paloma	Trinidad	Sancti Spíritus	4-I-2
Caracusey	Trinidad	Sancti Spíritus	4-I-2
La Pedrera	Trinidad	Sancti Spíritus	4-I-2
La Ermita	Trinidad	Sancti Spíritus	4-I-2
La Güira	Sancti Spíritus	Sancti Spíritus	4-I-2
Pozo Colorado	Sancti Spíritus	Sancti Spíritus	4-I-2
Banao	Sancti Spíritus	Sancti Spíritus	4-I-2
Entronque Guasimal (to Guasimal)	Sancti Spíritus	Sancti Spíritus	4-I-2
**Sancti Spíritus**	(Sancti Spíritus)	Sancti Spíritus	4-I-2

== See also ==
- Roads in Cuba
- Circuito Norte
- Circuito Sur de Oriente
