= Highway I–16 (Cuba) =

Road in Cuba

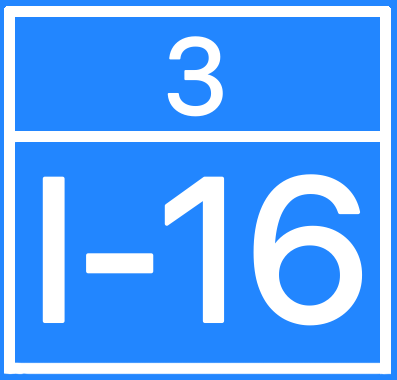
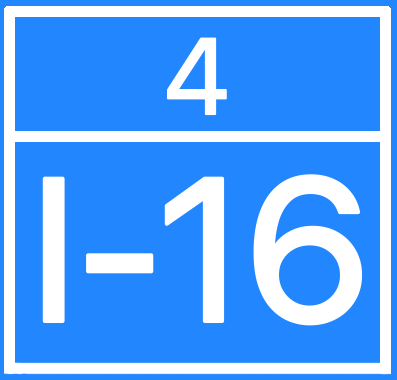
I–16
- Carretera Jagüey Grande–Playa Larga–Real Campiña
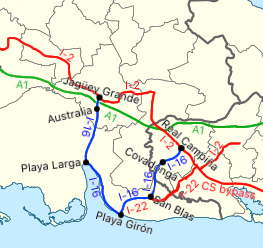
- The I–16 in blue, with 3 major roads it junctions, the I–2 (including the Circuito Sur bypass) and I–22 seen in red, along with the A1 motorway seen in green

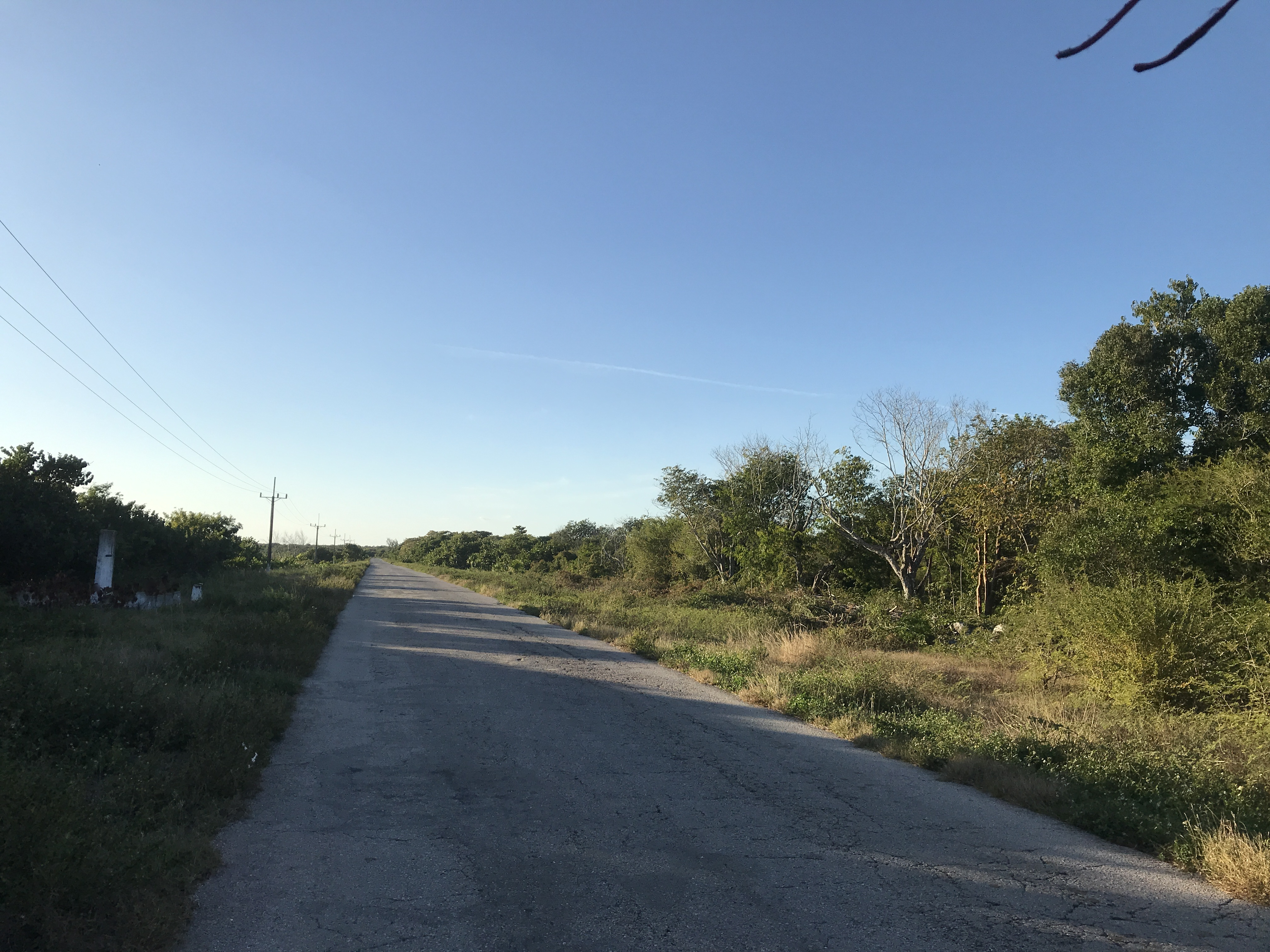
- 3–I–16 between Playa Larga and Playa Girón in Matanzas Province

Route information
- Length: 108.49 km (67.41 mi)

Major junctions
- West end: 3–I–2 in Jagüey Grande
- Jagüey Grande Beltway in Jagüey Grande; A1 in Jagüey Grande; Calle Caletón in Playa Larga; 3–I–22 in San Blas
- East end: 4–I–2 in Real Campiña

Location
- Country: Cuba
- Provinces: Matanzas Province, Cienfuegos Province
- Municipalities: Jagüey Grande, Ciénaga de Zapata, Aguada de Pasajeros
- Towns: Jagüey Grande, Playa Larga, Covadonga
- Villages: Australia, Pío Cuac, Los Alpes, San Isidro, Palpite, Playa Girón, Helechal, San Blas, Real Campiña

Highway system
- Roads in Cuba

Highway I–16, split into 3–I–16 and 4–I–16, is a bypass of the Circuito Sur (I–2), going from Jagüey Grande to Real Campiña in Cuba. It is the main road of the towns of Australia, Playa Larga, Playa Girón, and Covadonga.

== History ==
During the Bay of Pigs Invasion, American forces mostly had power and were mostly fighting on the road of Covadonga (4–I–16) and the road of Yaguaramas (4–I–22). After the Americans left, the road looked like a “dystopian film”, with a bus seen on fire while heading into the town of Covadonga.

In March 2022, the migration of the Red land crab in the region led to a dangerous hazard on the road and anyone driving on it, with the 30 kilometer stretch between the towns of Playa Larga and Playa Girón being the worst, said by an alert by the Municipal Assembly of People's Power of Ciénaga de Zapata.

== Route ==
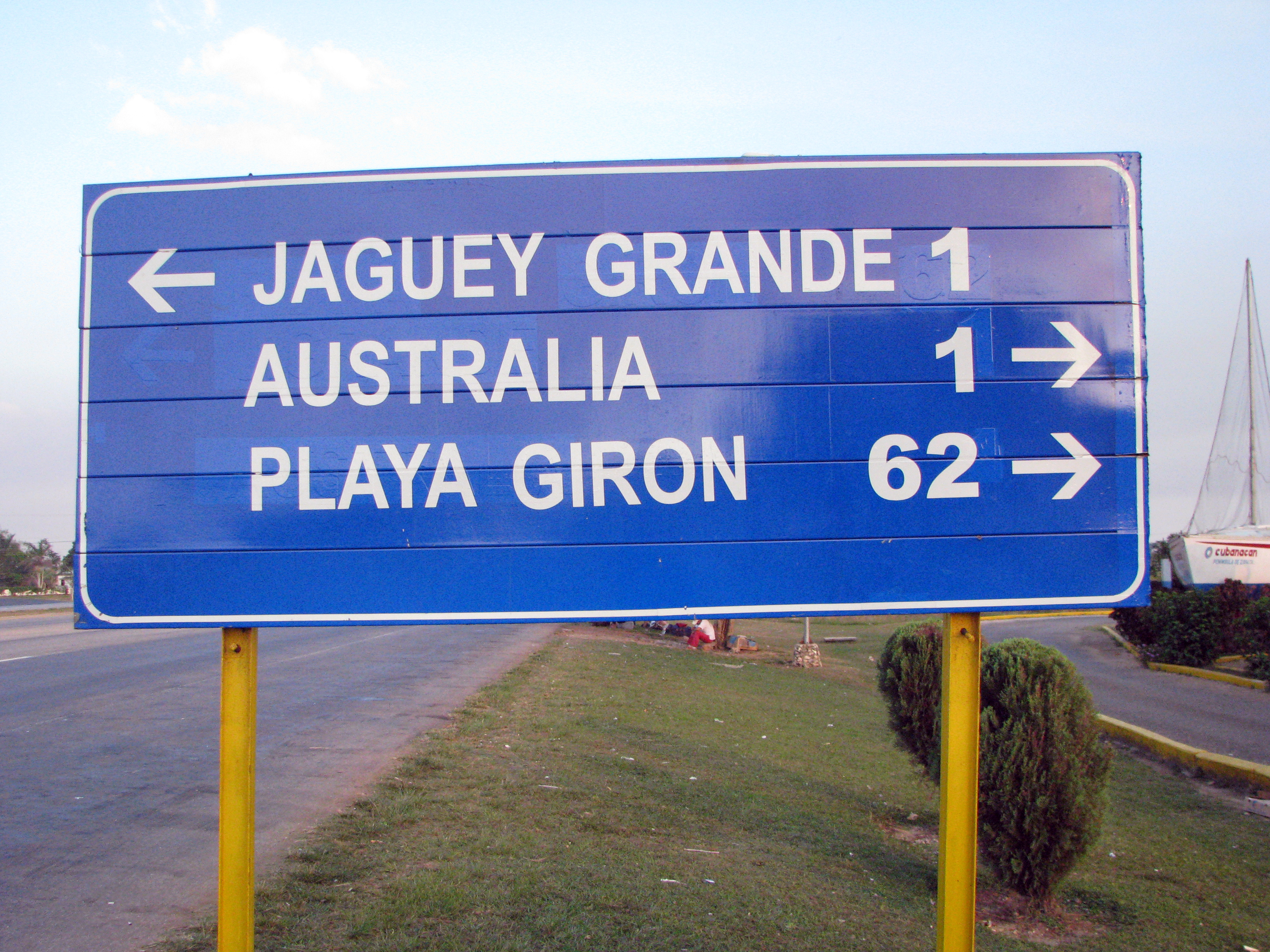
Sign seen on the A1 on the exit to the I–16

The I–16 starts as 3–I–16 in Jagüey Grande, Matanzas Province, from the Circuito Sur (3–I–2) which goes south to an at-grade intersection with the Autopista Nacional (National Motorway), and keeps going south into the towns of Australia and Playa Larga, in which it reaches the southern coast of Cuba in the Bay of Pigs, where it then follows the coastline going southeast until the town of Playa Girón. In Playa Girón, the I–22 highway also begins, in the same route of the I–16, which both goes north to the town of Helechal and later San Blas, where they split at a y-junction, with the I–16 going north and I–22 going east. After this, the road goes into Cienfuegos Province, where it turns into the 4–I–16, and into the town of Covadonga (officially Antonio Sanchez), where it turns northeast to the town of Real Campiña, back at the Circuito Sur (now 4–I–2).

== Junction list ==
Municipality	Location	km	mi	Destination	Notes
Jagüey Grande	Jagüey Grande	0	0	Calle 56 (Circuito Sur / 3–I–2) – P. Betancourt, Perico, U. de Reyes	Continues as Calle 15 (Calle Reyes) northbound, and starts from Calle 13 (Calle Cespedes) southbound
Jagüey Grande	Jagüey Grande	0	0	Calle 58 (Circuito Sur / 3–I–2) – Cienfuegos	
Jagüey Grande	Jagüey Grande	1.27	0.79	Jagüey Grande Beltway	
Jagüey Grande	Jagüey Grande town limits	1.75	1.09	A1 (Autopista Nacional)	Unsigned
Jagüey Grande	Australia	2.91	1.81	Calle 40 – Memorial Comandacia FAR	
Ciénaga de Zapata		20.28	12.6	Service center La Boca	
Ciénaga de Zapata	Playa Larga	29.50	18.33	Calle 1ra – Playa Caleton	Western terminus of 4 lane section with median
Ciénaga de Zapata	Playa Larga	30.26	18.80	Policlincio Playa Larga	
Ciénaga de Zapata	Playa Larga	30.43	18.91	Return	Return roundabout with itself
Ciénaga de Zapata		31.24	19.41		Western terminus of 4 lane section with median
Ciénaga de Zapata		33.18	20.62	Soplillar Avenue – Memorial 50 Aniversario	Hard to tell what it's signed as, appears to be "Soplillar Ave", could be wrong
Ciénaga de Zapata		62.74	38.99	?	Major 4 lane street without a name on OpenStreetmap
Ciénaga de Zapata	Playa Girón	63.68	39.57	Aerodromo Playa Girón	
Ciénaga de Zapata	Playa Girón	64.18	39.88	Calle 10 – Mueso de Playa Girón	
Ciénaga de Zapata	Playa Girón	64.55	40.11	3–I–22 / Road of Caleta Buena / Playa Los Cocos Road	Western terminus of concurrency with 3–I–22
Ciénaga de Zapata	Helechal	72.55	45.08	Road of Cayo Ramona	
Ciénaga de Zapata	San Blas	78.79	48.95	3–I–22	Y intersection; Eastern terminus of concurrency with 3–I–22; Western terminus of unpaved section
Ciénaga de Zapata - Aguada de Pasajeros municipal border		88.43	54.95	3–I–16 / 4–I–16	Western terminus of 3–I–16; Eastern terminus of 4–I–16; Eastern terminus of unpaved section
Aguada de Pasajeros	Covadonga	95.10	59.09	Road to the Antonio Sanchez Sugar Mill	
Aguada de Pasajeros	Covadonga	97.49	60.58	?	Unnamed major street on OpenStreetMap
Aguada de Pasajeros	Real Campiña	108.49	67.41	4–I–2 (Circuito Sur)	
