= Agramonte, Cuba =

Agramonte
- Village
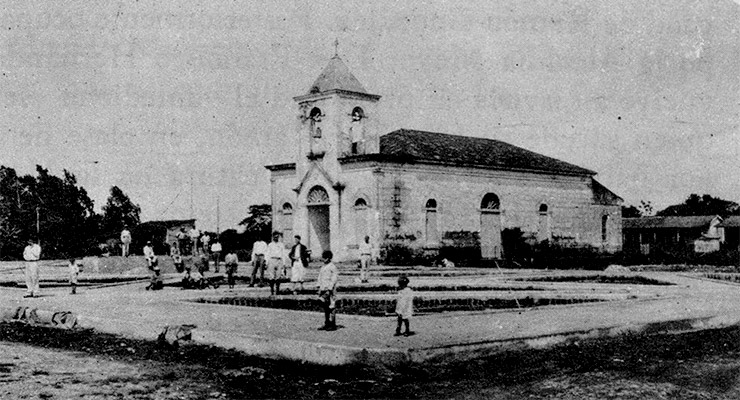
- Church of Agramonte in 1925

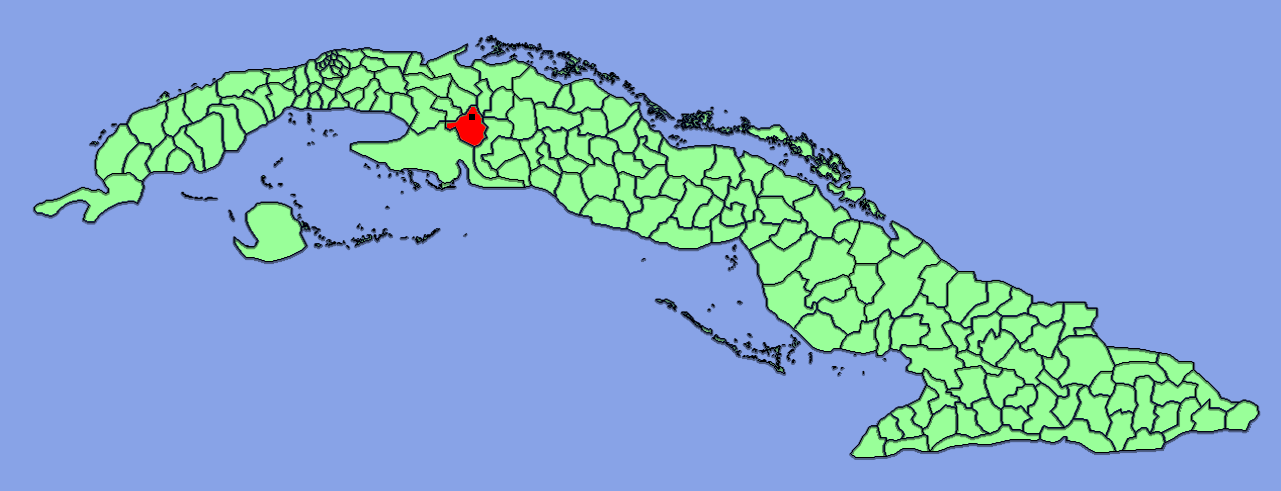
- Agramonte (black dot) within the municipality of Jagüey Grande (red) and Cuba

- Location of Agramonte in Cuba
- Coordinates: 22°40′34″N 81°06′56″W
- Country: Cuba
- Province: Matanzas
- Municipality: Jagüey Grande
- Founded: 1859
- Elevation: 140 m (460 ft)

Population (2011)
  - Total: 10,502
- Time zone: UTC-5 (EST)

Agramonte is a Cuban village and consejo popular of the municipality of Jagüey Grande, Matanzas Province. With a population of 10,502, it is the most populated village in the municipality after Jagüey.

== History ==
Founded in 1859 with the name of Cuevitas, it was renamed after Ignacio Agramonte, a Cuban revolutionary and patriot during the Ten Years' War (1868–1878). Until the 1976 reform, Agramonte was an autonomous municipality that extended in the northern area of the municipal territory of Jagüey Grande.

== Geography ==
Agramonte is located in the middle of an agricultural plain, between Perico and Jagüey Grande (both 17 km far). It is 20 km far from Jovellanos, 25 from Colón, 28 from Pedro Betancourt, 38 from Calimete, and 72 from Matanzas.

== Transport ==
The village is crossed in the middle by the Highway 3–222 from Jagüey Grade to Perico, and is 20 km in the north of A1 motorway. It counts a railway station on the Havana-Güines-Aguada-Cienfuegos line that is also served by a regional service from Matanzas.

== See also ==
- Australia (village)
- List of cities in Cuba
- Municipalities of Cuba
