= Cabezas (Unión de Reyes) =

Cabezas San Antonio de Cabezas
- Village
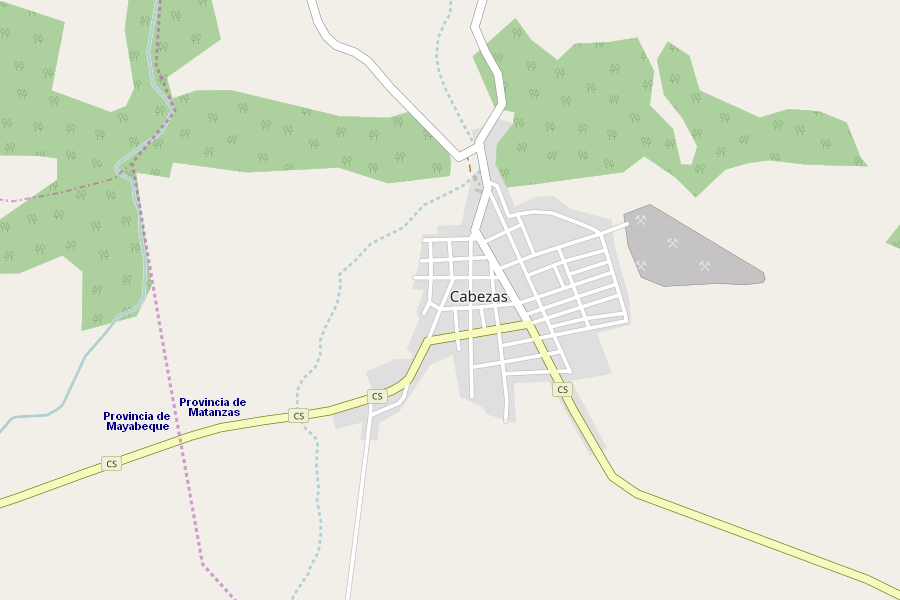
- OSM map showing Cabezas

- Location of Cabezas in Cuba
- Coordinates: 22°50′26.5″N 81°40′40.2″W
- Country: Cuba
- Province: Matanzas
- Municipality: Unión de Reyes
- Founded: 1822

Area
  - Total: 28.70 km^{2} (11.08 sq mi)
- Elevation: 120 m (390 ft)

Population
  - Total: 5,549
- Time zone: UTC-5 (EST)
- Area code: +53-52

Cabezas, also known as San Antonio de Cabezas, is a Cuban village and consejo popular ("people's council", i.e. hamlet) of the municipality of Unión de Reyes, in Matanzas Province. Sometimes referred to as Wajay, it has a population of 5,549 and the council's administrative territory covers an area of 28.70 km².

== History ==
The village was founded in 1822 around the church of San Antonio, and its population increased from 1827. Before the administrative reform of 1976, it was an autonomous municipality that included the villages of Bermeja, Bija, Lima and Magdalena.

== Geography ==
Located at the borders between the provinces of Matanzas and Mayabeque, Cabezas spans on a plain north of the Zapata Swamp. It is 6 km far from Bermeja, 8 from Palos, 14 from Nueva Paz, 20 from Unión de Reyes, 37 from Matanzas and 88 from Havana.

== Transport ==
The village is crossed in the middle by the Circuito Sur highway (CS) and nearest station, Palos (on the Havana-Güines-Cienfuegos railway), is 8 km southwest. Nearest motorway exit, "Nueva Paz" (on the A1 motorway), is 14 km southwest.

== See also ==
- Municipalities of Cuba
- List of cities in Cuba
