= Pedro Betancourt Dávalos =

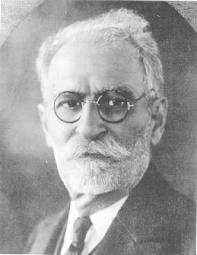
Pedro Estanislao Betancourt

Pedro Betancourt Dávalos (1858–1933) was a medical doctor, major general, diplomat, Secretary of Agriculture, politician, and Cuban revolutionary in the Cuban War of Independence.

== Early life and education ==
Pedro Betancourt Dávalos was born on August 6, 1858, in La Palma near the town of Sabanilla del Encomendador, Matanzas Province. His parents were Juan Florencio Betancourt and Clotilde Davalos. His early studies took place at Las Normales in the city of Matanzas. He would return to the family farm in Sabanilla during the holidays. Later, his secondary school, La Empresa, was run by the Guitars brothers. At this time he was exposed to liberal and revolutionary ideas. The school was closed by order of the Spanish government at the beginning of the war in 1868. He graduated from high school in 1874, and went on to study medicine at the University of Havana. In 1878, he entered the University of Pennsylvania, from which he graduated in 1881.

== Career ==
Early in his career, on September 20, 1881, Betancourt was admitted to practice medicine in the city of Matanzas for a term of six years. After that term he studied at the Sorbonne in Paris, during which time he was painted in evening dress by Cuban portraitist Armando Menocal. He went to Madrid to validate his medical degree in Spain, and on May 30, 1888, he was validated by the Spanish Ministerio de Fomento, allowing him to practice medicine in Cuba permanently.

Shortly after his return to the island, Betancourt began actively organizing revolutionary activities under direct orders from José Martí, the president of the Cuban Revolutionary Party, who was in exile. He coordinated an uprising of the revolutionary forces at the town of Ibarra on February 24, 1895. The uprising failed, resulting in the capture and death of the many revolutionaries. Betancourt was captured returning to the city of Matanzas and was held at the castle of San Severino. He was then transferred to Havana and later exiled to Spain. On June 10, 1895, with the help of Major General Calixto García, he escaped and traveled to Paris. There he met the Cuban delegate Dr. Betances and received orders to travel to the United States.

Betancourt went to New York City, where he made contact with Tomás Estrada Palma and integrated into a group of revolutionaries organized to go to fight in Cuba. On August 30, 1895, after failing to return to Cuba, he was imprisoned with other Cubans in Wilmington, Delaware and accused of conspiring against the Spanish crown. They were acquitted and released, as noted in the September 13, 1895, issue of Evening Star of Washington DC.

After other failed attempts, Betancourt and others organized an expedition departing from New York on March 24, 1896, and landed in Maravi near Baracoa Oriente province. After contacting the local revolutionary command, he received orders to join the liberation forces in Matanzas. According to the unedited diary La Brigada de Cárdenas, the insurgent fight against the government of Spain in the province of Matanzas was extremely difficult and demanding. Matanzas has a flat terrain and was crisscrossed by railroad lines facilitating effective movements of Spanish troops from the main garrisons in Havana. In addition, the land was well cultivated and there were no large woods or deserted areas. Given this topography, fighting the Spanish forces became a very difficult task. The Cuban forces fought daily in what is commonly referred to as guerrilla warfare.

On June 4, 1896, he joined forces in Matanzas. He received orders from General Lacret Morlot, head of the division of Matanzas, to organized and lead a brigade in the northwest region of the province. In late June, they participated in an action at the sugar mill San Miguel near Sabanilla. After that General Lacret ordered the transfer of the regiments led by Colonels Sanguily and Dantin, of the southern brigade, to be incorporated under his command.

On August 6, 1896, Betancourt was conferred the rank of colonel. He joined the regiment of Colonel Dantin and took the town of Nueva Paz in the first days of September. On November 17, 1896, The Roanoke Times reported in Wilmington, Delaware that Betancourt was killed with a machete by Spanish troops who attacked a field hospital. It was later found to be his cousin Dr. Pedro A. Betancourt. Betancourt received a gunshot wound in his side (entering the right side and exiting the left) during the battle of the sugar mill Magdalena against Spanish Colonel Rabadan of the Spanish civil guard. Colonel Eduardo Rosell y Malpica took over as he recovered. In the first months of 1897, he joined forces with Colonel Cuervo, head of the brigade Southwest of Havana, and attacked the villages of Nueva Paz and San Nicolas in the province of Havana.

On February 10, 1897, The Evening Star in Washington DC reported an interview with Máximo Gómez in which Betancourt was his spokesman. The newspaper reported that on the morning of the interview held at the camp of Gomes in Salado, Las Villas Province, a Mass was officiated by Father Arteaga and attended by General Betancourt, Colonel Menocal, and Dr. Agramonte. On or about February 10, 1897, he was asked to take over the North Brigade, by direct orders of General Maximo Gomez and personally led by General Rosas. After, Betancourt moved some of his troops to the Zapata swamps to rest his cavalry, he was ambushed by a Spanish regiment under the command of Colonel Pavia near Oito. Many were killed, among them Colonel Rosell y Malpica. Captain Fernando Diago managed to escape and assumed the responsibilities held by Rosell.

On May 29, 1897, The San Francisco Call reported an assassination attempt on Betancourt by a traitor named Andricain, in the service of the Spanish governor of Matanzas, at Gral. He was to infiltrate Betancourt's troops of and try to assassinate him. The plot was discovered and the traitor was taken prisoner, tried, and sentenced to death by hanging.

On July 26, 1897, Betancourt was granted the rank of Brigadier and conferred the command of the 1st 5th Division by order of General Maximo Gomez and Major General J. M. Rodriguez; he maintained that office until the end of the war.

On September 17, 1897, The Times of Washington DC reported that near the city of Matanzas a battle that lasted more than six hours took place between troops of General Betancourt and Spanish forces. It was reported that the Spanish casualties were considerable, with more than seventy-two dead and one hundred and two wounded. It was also reported also that the city was terrorized because of the closeness of the fighting.

On September 29, 1897, The New York Sun reported that the primary Cuban generals, including General Betancourt, commented on the mission to American ambassador Stewart L. Woodford during his visit to Spain. In addition to criticizing the possible American intervention, the generals felt that the solution to the Spanish domain was not diplomacy, but rather combat. The New York Sun reported in its November 18, 1897, edition information about the campaign in Matanzas. An official report indicates that eleven major battles were held in October and six in November. During one of these battles, there was an attack and seizure of the town Corral Nuevo, in which several Spanish soldiers were killed before leaving the village. The mambises (guerillas) occupied arms and ammunition in abundance.

On November 19, 1897, the Dalles, Oregon newspaper reported that General Betancourt opposed the offers for a Cuban autonomous state made by the Spanish Governor Blanco.

On December 31, 1897, Betancourt was granted the rank of General of Division. On April 11, 1898, The Washington Times reported that General Betancourt commanded about four thousand men under arms in the province of Matanzas. On April 20, 1898, the North Platte newspaper reported that General Betancourt had communicated to the troops under his command an immediate cessation of hostilities in the Matanzas province. On July 3, 1898, the Salt Lake Herald newspaper reported, among other incidents, that Betancourt's regimental flag was sent to a lady in Key West, as it had been used in different battles and had been damaged subsequently by Spanish Mauser bullets. This flag had been made by patriotic ladies of the city of Cárdenas. On May 4, 1898, The Sun reported the organization and the respective strength of the Cuban army: the 5th. Army Corps was composed of two divisions, the first led by General. Betancourt.

On August 15, 1898, Betancourt was granted the rank of Major General. On September 14, 1898, St. Paul Globe reported on the proposed nominations for the presidency of the Republic of Cuba. One was President José Miguel Gómez with General Betancourt as vice president. On October 1, 1898, the New York Daily Tribune reported that General Betancourt was chosen, among others, as a delegate from Matanzas to the convention to be held on October 10 for the presidential election. On November 28, 1898, The Washington Times reported that food rations were sent by the order of President William McKinley to be distributed in Cuba in order to feed the hungry population. Commissioner Gould met with General Betancourt to organize the distribution in the province of Matanzas.

On January 10, 1899, The Evening Herald reported that Betancourt was licensed from the Cuban Liberation Army. On January 11, Betancourt met with General Wilson to coordinate the entrance of the Cuban army into the city of Matanzas after the evacuation of Spanish troops, under the supervision of Wilson and American troops. On January 14, 1899, The New York Tribune reported the departure of Spanish troops on the steamship San Francisco and the entry into Matanzas of the troops of General Betancourt. Betancourt came into the governor's palace carried on the shoulders of members of his troop and gave a speech to the people who filled the square. There were fireworks and music by the band of the 12th Army Corps. On February 4, 1899, the St. Paul Globe reported the peace process and restoration of order under the responsibility of the various generals in the provinces, including General Betancourt in Matanzas. On March 7, 1899, The San Francisco Call reported on a meeting between Generals Wilson and Betancourt to coordinate the imminent withdrawal of American troops from the national territory.

Betancourt was appointed civil governor of the province of Matanzas by the American forces. He was part of the Constituent Assembly that drafted the first Constitution of Cuba and was nominated for vice president as one of the candidates for the first constitutional government.

On April 29, 1901, The New York Tribune reported that five commissioners of the Cuban Constitutional Commission would go to Washington to meet with President McKinley on the future of Cuba and the proposed Platt Amendment. Betancourt participated in the vote on the proposal of the Platt Amendment, of which he approved. On May 5, 1902, The New York Tribune reported that the two Cuban legislative bodies, the Senate and the House of Representatives, were present for the first hoisting of the Cuban flag. Among the senators was Betancourt, elected by the Matanzas province.

On March 31, 1906, he held a banquet in honor of General Domingo Mendez Capote to celebrate his election as vice president. Don Tomas Estrada Palma, the first president-elect chose to be re-elected after finishing his first period as president, causing riots and unrest in the country. The United States government, trying to avoid a major armed conflict, announced an intervention. Several generals and their armies declared that they would fight against an American intervention in Cuba.

On September 28, 1906, The Minneapolis Journal reported a statement by General Betancourt referring to a possible American invasion which stated that he was ready to gather his troops and return to fight in the province of Matanzas. The turmoil was solved without military intervention. The United States government decided on a political intervention and set up a temporary Cuban government.

In 1912, disgusted by the corruption of the Cuban government, Betancourt decided to leave the island and move his family to Philadelphia. Due to a polio epidemic in the US, however, he cancelled the trip. Betancourt retired from politics and was dedicated to agricultural business activities. He purchased from the Lamar family the farms La Reunion and San Jose in Matanzas. Betancourt acquired a sugar plantation from the Orozco sugar mill, and a large citrus plantation (Nazareno) near Bahia Honda bay in Pinar del Rio province.

From 1922 to 1925, Betancourt was appointed minister of agriculture, trade and labor, during the government of President Alfredo Zayas y Alfonso. On October 10, 1922, The Maui News reported that Secretary Betancourt promised to remedy the appalling conditions of Spanish workers who were hired as temporary employees in the sugar industry.

In 1924, he was appointed plenipotentiary ambassador to the Republic of Peru representing Cuba in commemoration of the 100th anniversary of the Battle of Ayacucho. He went to the US for a meeting of veterans of the Spanish–American War and was elected chairman of the Cuban Independence War Veterans.

== Personal life ==
In 1900, Betancourt married Haydee de Lamar Capo, a woman from Matanzas. They had seven children.

== Death and legacy ==
In 1932, Betancourt participated in several meetings with important political figures to discuss the resignation of President Gerardo Machado during his imposed second term in office. Machado ordered his incarceration, but due to his poor health he was confined to his residence under house arrest. He died shortly after on May 19, 1933.

To honor his contribution to Cuban independence, several official actions were taken: the town and municipality of Corral Falso was renamed Pedro Betancourt, a major highway in the city of Matanzas was renamed Calzada General Betancourt, and a marble statue was erected at one of the parks in Matanzas.
