= Roads in Cuba =

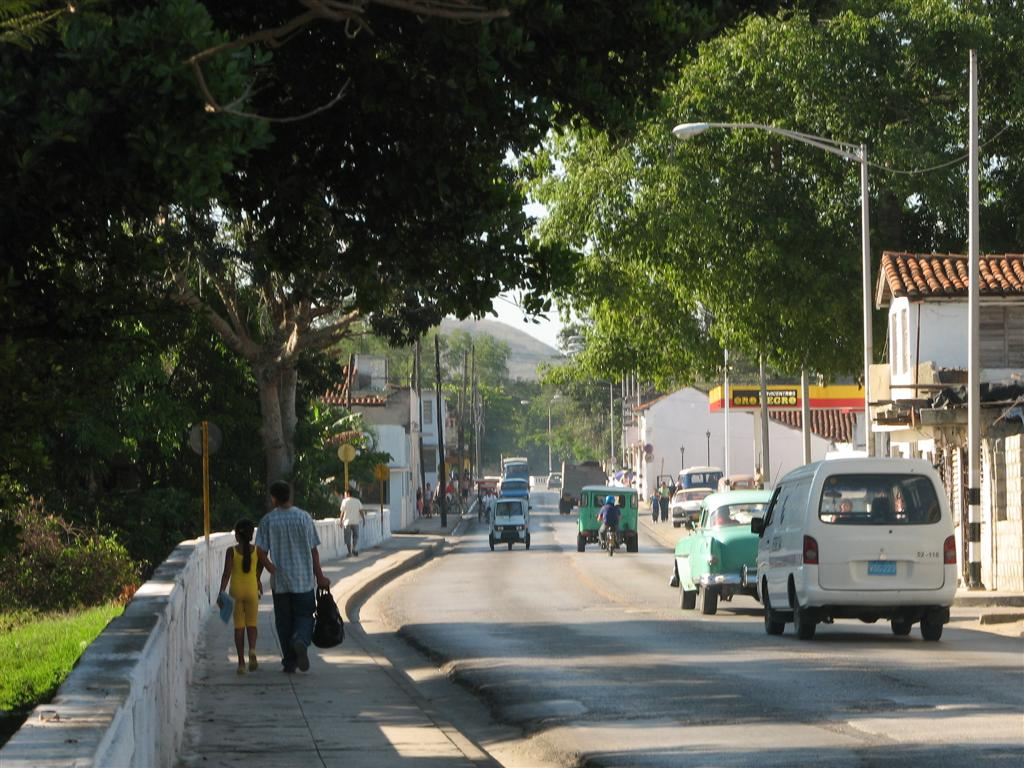
The Carretera Central through Santa Clara

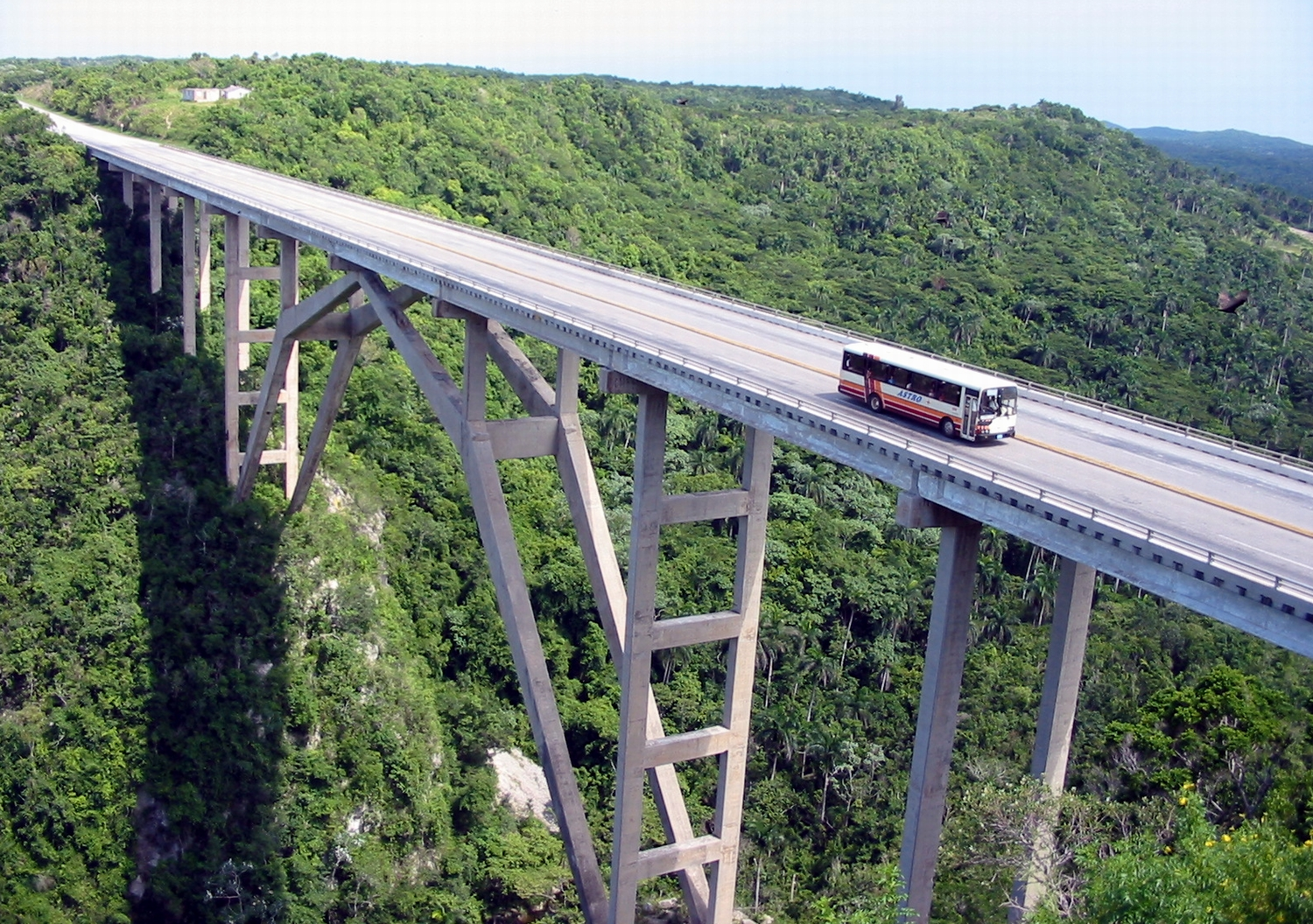
Vía Blanca at the bridge of Bacunayagua

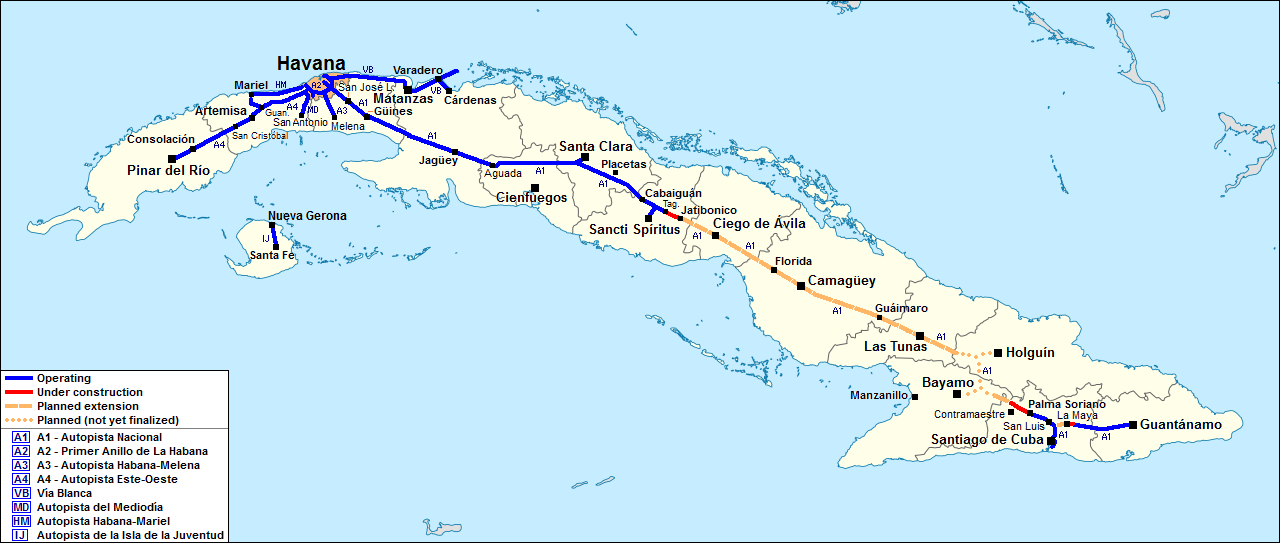
Map showing the Cuban motorway network

The road network of Cuba consists of 60,858 km (37,815 mi) of roads, of which over 29,850 km (18,550 mi) are paved and 31,038 km (19,286 mi) are unpaved. The Caribbean country counts also 654 km (406 mi) of motorways (autopistas).

== Motorways ==
=== Overview ===
Cuba has eight toll-free expressways named Autopistas, seven of them centralized in the city of Havana and connected to each other by the Havana Ring Road, with the exception of the motorway to Mariel. The carriageway is divided and the lanes in each direction go from two to four. Maximum speed limit is 120 km/h (75 mph). In the Isla de la Juventud, the dual carriageway from Nueva Gerona to La Fe is classified as a motorway.

The principal motorways A1 and A4, running from the west to the east of the island and partly unbuilt (most of A1 sections), are the only one numbered and shortened with "A". As well as the Carretera Central covers the entire island, they are projected to perform the same function as motorways.

The route from Matanzas to Varadero of the Vía Blanca is the only toll road between Cuban motorways. The other autopistas have short routes and run from Havana to its suburban towns in Artemisa and Mayabeque provinces.

=== List of motorways ===
Sign	Autopista	Route	Length	Notes
	A1 (Autopista Nacional)	Havana-Jagüey Grande-Santa Clara-Sancti Spíritus-Ciego de Ávila-Camagüey-Las Tunas-Holguín-Bayamo (Note: A1 project through Granma and Holguín provinces is yet undefined)-Santiago de Cuba-Guantánamo	900 km (560 mi) (c. 448 km (278 mi) operating)	Operating sections are: Havana-Santa Clara-Sancti Spíritus-Taguasco (354 km (220 mi), main section) (Note: passing through the provinces of Mayabeque, Matanzas, Cienfuegos, Villa Clara and Sancti Spíritus); Palma Soriano-Santiago, 53 km (33 mi); La Maya-Guantánamo, 41 km (25 mi); Other sections are under construction and planned.
	Autopista A1-1 (Autopista Santa Clara)	A1-Santa Clara		
	A2 (Havana Ring Road) (Primer Anillo de La Habana)	Havana (from Marianao to the Harbor)	36 km (22 mi)	Beltway serving Havana, a branch serves the José Martí Airport
	A3 (Autopista Havana-Melena)	Havana-Melena del Sur	32 km (20 mi)	...
	A4 (Autopista Este-Oeste)	Havana-Artemisa-Pinar del Río	156 km (97 mi)	Classified as part of the "Autopista Nacional"
	A4-1 (Autopista ZEDM)	A4-Port of Mariel		

== State highways ==
Cuba has a complex network of single carriageway highways, most of them numbered, named Carreteras or Circuitos. Some of the most prominent are:

- Carretera Central (CC, Central Road, code N–1, 1,435 km), the most important one, is a west–east highway spanning the length of the island of Cuba from the municipality of Sandino, in Pinar del Río Province, to the one of Baracoa, in Guantánamo Province, for a total length of 1,435 km.
- Circuito Norte (CN - Northern Road, code I–3, 1,222 km): it runs from Mantua (Pinar del Río Province) to Baracoa (Guantánamo Province) crossing the northern coast of Cuba, through Viñales municipal territory, Bahía Honda, Mariel, Havana, Varadero, Matanzas, Cárdenas, Sagua la Grande, Caibarién, Yaguajay, Morón, Nuevitas, Puerto Padre, Holguín, Mayarí, Sagua de Tánamo and Moa. The Vía Blanca and the Panamericana, both classified as motorways, are part of it.
- Circuito Sur (CS, Southern Road, code I–2, 491 km): it runs from Artemisa to Sancti Spíritus, through Güira de Melena, Batabanó, Güines, Jagüey Grande, Aguada de Pasajeros, Cienfuegos and Trinidad.
- Circuito Sur de Oriente (CSO, Southeastern Road, code 6–4 and 6–20, 347 km): it runs from Bayamo to Santiago de Cuba through Manzanillo, Niquero, Pilón and Chivirico.

Other more minor state highways are numbered east to west per pre-1970s province, with the numbering system largely going unupdated and unused also after the 70s. The numbers are 1 for Pinar del Río Province, 2 for La Habana Province, 3 for Matanzas Province, 4 for Las Villas Province, 5 for Camagüey Province, and 6 for Oriente Province, with each province having secondary numbers for each road, also going from east to west 1–999. More major highways use the letter "I" as a prefix in front of the secondary number, such as the Circuito Norte (I–3), using 1–I–3, 2–I–3, 3–I–3, 4–I–3, 5–I–3, and 6–I–3. State highways in Cuba include:

Route sign code	Common name (if any)
1–N–1	Carretera Central / Carretera Panamericana
1–I–3	Circuito Norte
1–1	
1–2	Road to Manuel Lazo
1–22	
2–N–1	Carretera Central
2–I–2	Circuito Sur
2–I–3	Circuito Norte / Autopista Havana–Mariel / Vía Blanca
2–101	Carretera 101 / Autopista del Mediodia
2–200	Road to San Antonio de Los Baños
2–300	Road of Managua
2–400	Vía Monumental
3–N–1	Carretera Central
3–I–2	Circuito Sur
3–I–3	Circuito Norte / Vía Blanca
3–I–16	Jagüey Grande–Playa Girón Road
4–N–1	Carretera Central
4–I–2	Circuito Sur
4–I–3	Circuito Norte
4–I–16	Road of Covadonga
4–I–22	Playa Girón–Yaguaramas Road
4–4–2	Road of Sagua
4–66	Autopista Sancti Spiritus
4–112	Villa Clara–Cienfuegos Road
4–311	Road of Malezas / Santa Clara–Encrucijada Road
4–321	Santa Clara–Caibarién Road / Road of Camajuaní
4–531	Sancti Spíritus–Yaguajay Road
5–N–1	Carretera Central
5–I–3	Circuito Norte
5–I–23	Road of Brasil
5–445	Nuevitas–Camagüey Road
6–N–1	Carretera Central
6–I–3	Circuito Norte
6–4	Road to Niquero
6–20	Gramma Road
6–152	Bayamo–Las Tunas Road
6–922	Road of La Tinta
N–102–C (Note: N means "Nacional" (national), with C not having a clear meaning (possibly central but unconfirmed))	Road to Maisí

== Roadway signage ==
Cuba has acceded to the 1968 United Nations' Vienna Convention on Road Signs and Signals concerning standardization for its roadway signage.

== See also ==
- License plates of Cuba
- Cocotaxi
- Havana MetroBus
- Transport in Cuba
- Rail transport in Cuba
