= Cueva de la Pluma =

Archaeological site in Cuba

Pluma Cave
- Location within Cuba
- Interactive map of Pluma Cave
- Location: Matanzas Municipality, Cuba
- Nearest city: Matanzas, Cuba
- Coordinates: 23°07′58.8″N 81°35′02.4″W

Cueva de la Pluma ("Cave of the Feathers") is an archeological site in the province of Matanzas, Cuba.

Remains of 3 individuals (2 adults and a child) have been found at this site. In addition, a necklace of dolphin teeth and small shells was found associated with one of the burials.
