= I16 =

I16 may refer to:

- Interstate 16, an interstate highway in the U.S. state of Georgia
- Highway I–16 (Cuba), a highway in the provinces of Matanzas and Cienfuegos, southern Cuba
- Polikarpov I-16, a Soviet fighter aircraft introduced in the 1930s
- Halland Regiment
- Japanese submarine I-16, a Japanese Type C submarine
- i16, a name for the 16-bit signed integer, especially in Rust
- VEF I-16, a Latvian fighter prototype built in 1940
- IPhone 16, the 2024 smartphone by Apple.

== See also ==
- I-16-class submarine
