= Australia, Cuba =

Village in Matanzas Province, Cuba

Australia
- Village
- Location of Australia in Cuba
- Coordinates: 22°29′58.16″N 81°8′9.17″W
- Country: Cuba
- Province: Matanzas
- Municipality: Jagüey Grande
- Founded: 1862
- Elevation: 7 m (23 ft)
- Time zone: UTC-5 (EST)
- Area code: +53-52

Australia is a Cuban village and consejo popular ("people's council", i.e. hamlet) of the municipality of Jagüey Grande, Matanzas Province. It has an estimated population of 8,850.

== History ==
The village, founded in 1862, is in a sugar growing area and "dominated by the old, out-of-service sugar factory's chimney, with "Australia" written prominently down its length." The village is named after the factory, the Central Australia, which like others in the area were named after continents.

The village was the first sugar town in Cuba to stop using slave labour, and served as Fidel Castro's base of operations during the 1961 Bay of Pigs invasion.

== Geography ==
Located 2 km south of Jagüey Grande, Australia, it lies next to Zapata Swamp (Ciénaga de Zapata). It is served by the A1 motorway (linking Havana to Santa Clara) at the exit of Jagüey.

== See also ==
- Agramonte (village)
- List of cities in Cuba
- Municipalities of Cuba
