= Bayamo–Las Tunas Road =

Road in Cuba

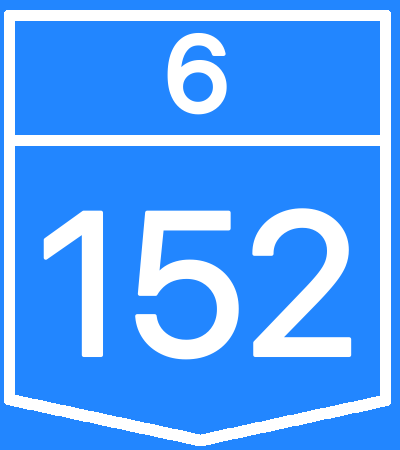
Bayamo–Las Tunas Road

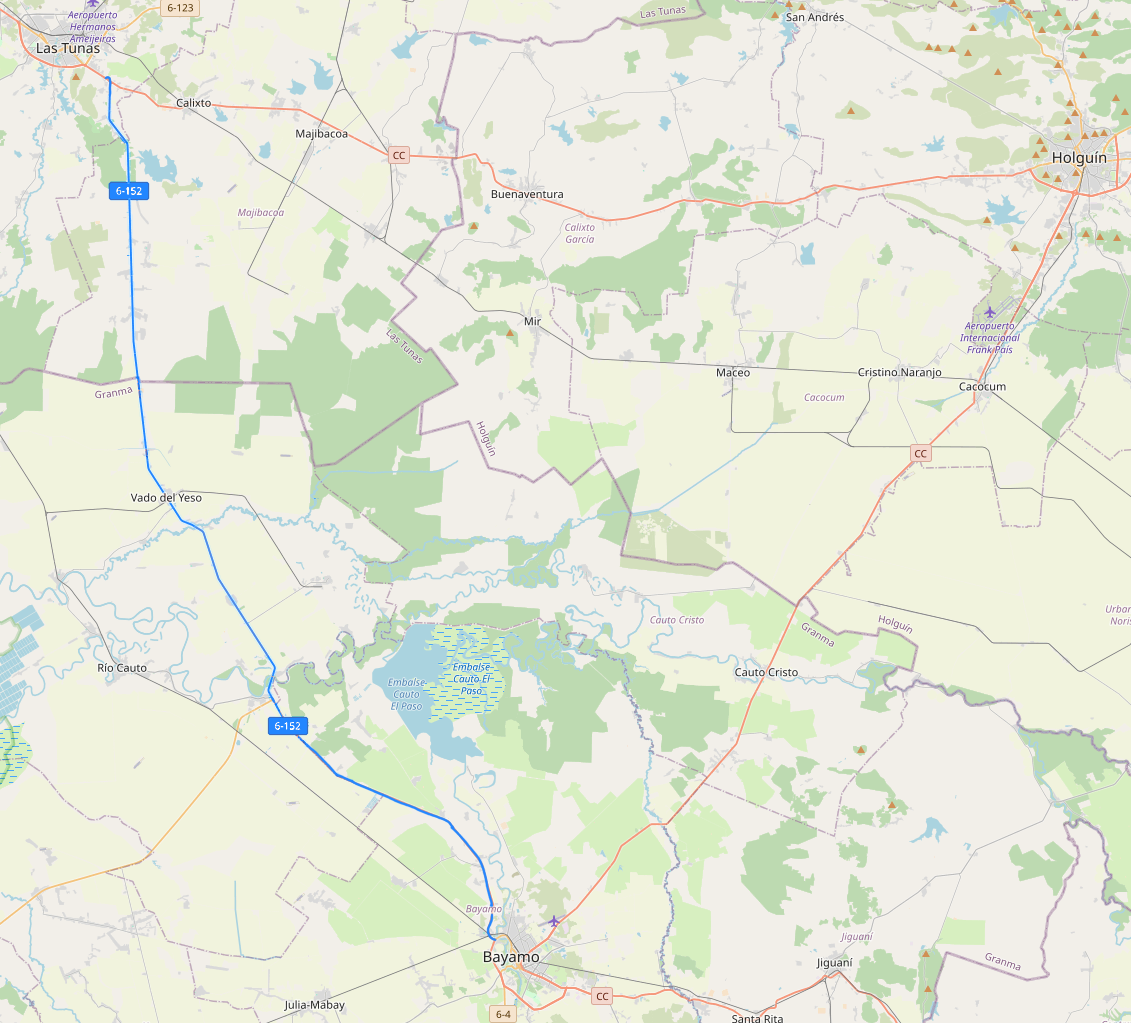
- The 6–152 seen in blue, with the section of the 6–N–1 it bypasses labeled as "CC"

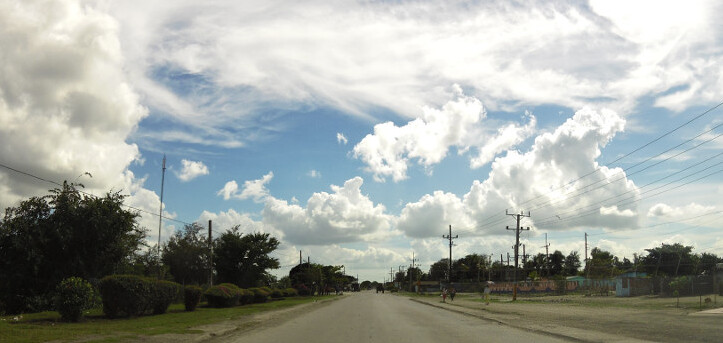
- The road in Vado del Yeso

Route information
- Length: 73 km (45 mi)
- Existed: 1933–present

Major junctions
- North end: Bayamo Beltway in Bayamo
- South end: 6–N–1 in Las Tunas

Location
- Country: Cuba
- Provinces: Granma, Las Tunas
- Municipalities: Bayamo, Río Cauto, Majibacoa, Las Tunas
- Major cities: Bayamo, Las Tunas
- Towns: Vado del Yeso
- Villages: Las Mangas, Cauto Embarcacdero, Miradero, La Piedra

Highway system
- Roads in Cuba

The Bayamo–Las Tunas Road (6-152) is a bypass road of the Carretera Central, connecting the cities of Bayamo and Las Tunas in Cuba. It was built during the 1930s, with the motto: Water, roads, and schools, the same one used during the construction of the Carretera Central.

== Characteristics ==
The road is 6 metres (20 ft) wide, two lanes in a single carriageway. The maximum speed of the route is approximately 60 kilometres per hour (37 mph).

== Route ==
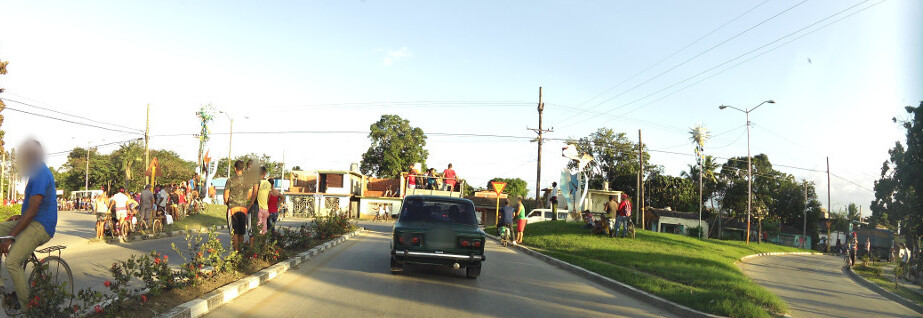
Intersection with the Bayamo Beltway

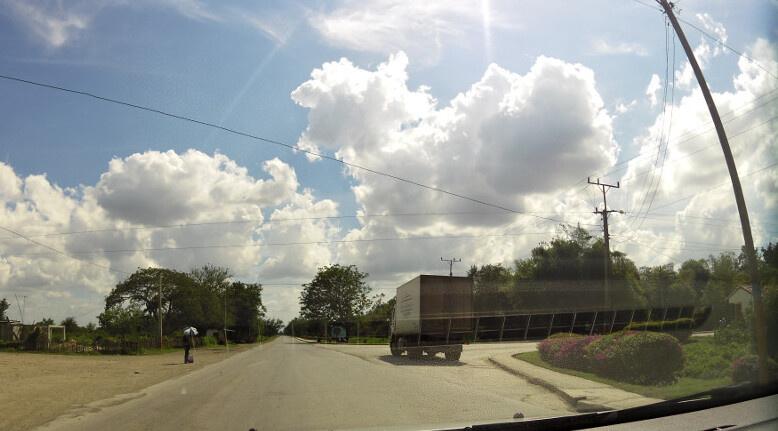
Intersection with Road to Río Cauto

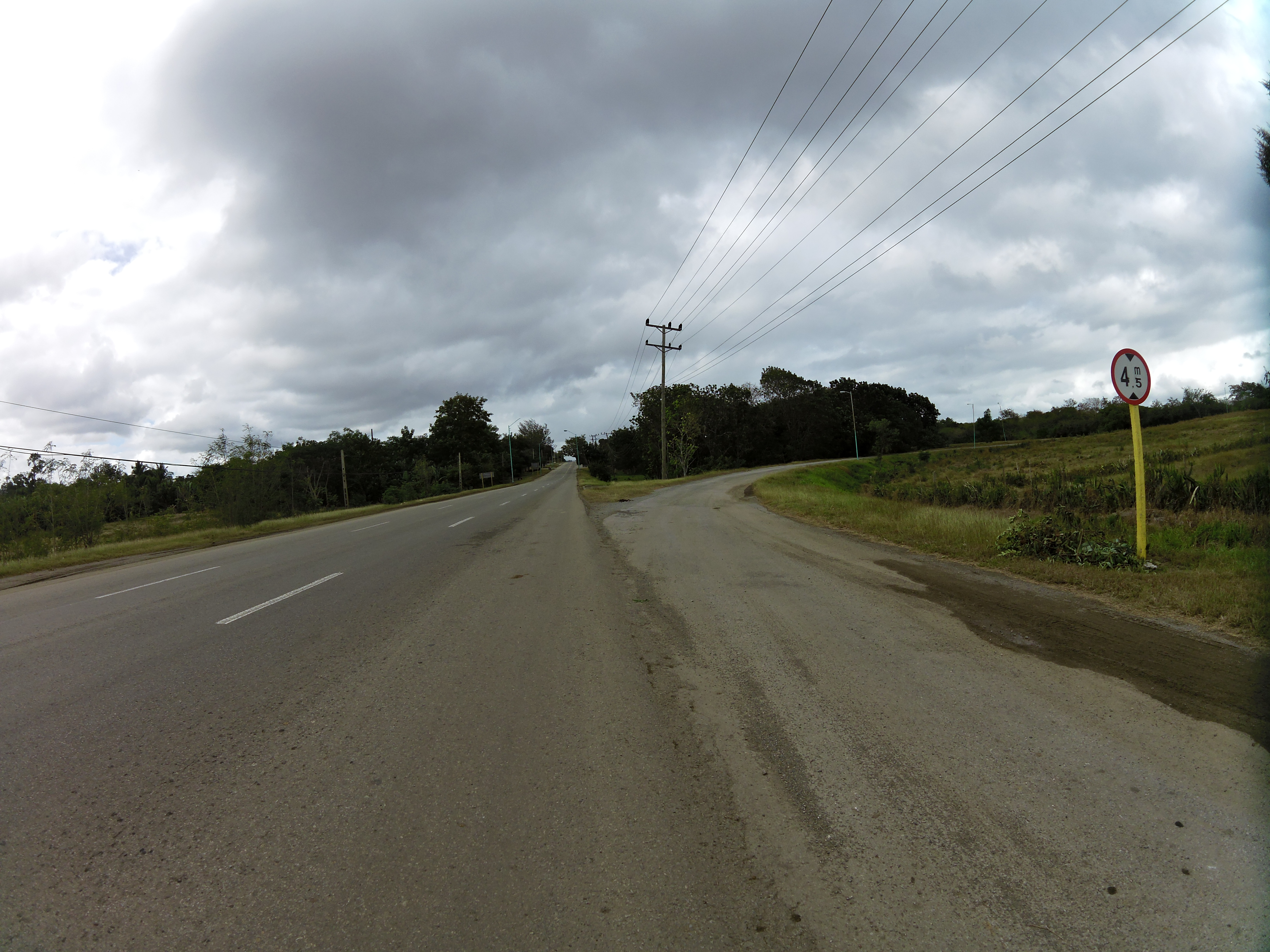
Exit to enter the 6-152 from the Carretera Central

Municipality	Destination	km
Bayamo	Bayamo Beltway	0
Río Cauto	Manzanillo–Cauto Embarcadero Road	25.5
Río Cauto	Cauto Embarcadero–Rio Cauto Road	25.6
Las Tunas	6–N–1 (Carretera Central)	73.7
