= Playa Girón =

- Village
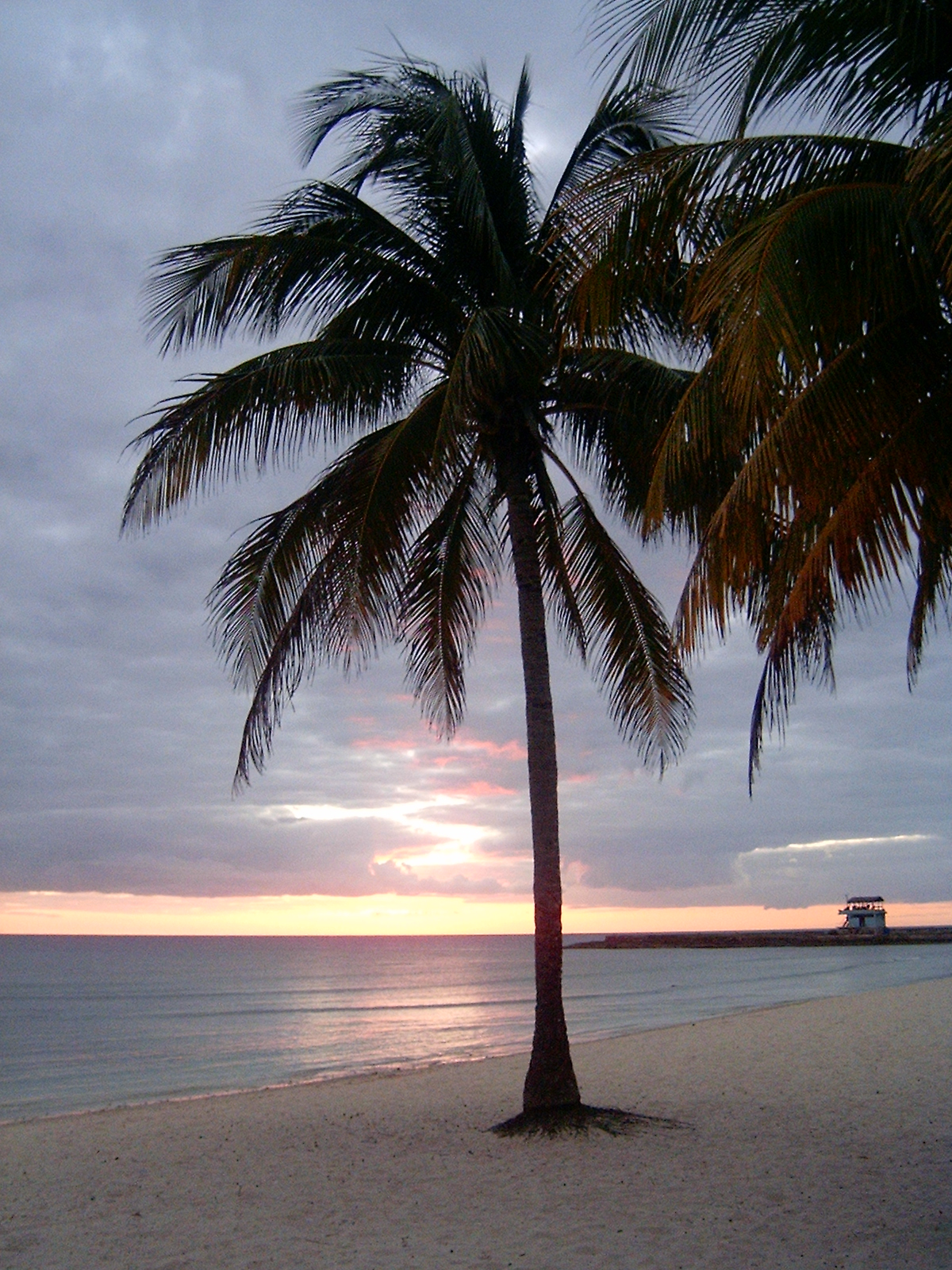
- Playa Girón at sunset

- Location of Playa Girón in Cuba
- Coordinates: 22°04′N 81°02′W
- Country: Cuba
- Province: Matanzas
- Municipality: Ciénaga de Zapata

Population
  - Total: 1,973
- Time zone: UTC-5 (EST)
- Area code: +53-52

Note: "Playa Girón" is also the title of a song included in the album "Días y Flores", by Silvio Rodriguez.

Playa Girón ([ˈplaʝa xiˈɾon]; "Girón beach") is a beach and village on the east bank of the Bahia de Cochinos (Bay of Pigs), which is located in the province of Matanzas, on the southern coast of Cuba. It is part of the municipality of Ciénaga de Zapata.

== Geography ==
Playa Girón is located in one of the largest wetlands in the world, the Ciénaga de Zapata (Zapata Swamp). The adjoining village of Girón was named after the notorious French pirate Gilberto Giron (c.1604).

== History ==
=== Bay of Pigs Invasion ===
In April 1961, Playa Girón was one of two landing sites for seaborne forces of about 1,500 armed Cuban exiles in the Bay of Pigs Invasion, an American CIA-sponsored attempt to overthrow the new government of Cuban Prime Minister Fidel Castro. Over 72 hours, fighting took place in many parts of the Cienaga de Zapata, Playa Girón being the last remaining area occupied by the invaders. Today, the Museo Girón is a small museum dedicated to the historical conflict.

=== Other ===
Since 1962 the Campeonato Nacional de Boxeo Playa Girón amateur boxing tournament is held at the beach; winners have included Teófilo Stevenson and Juan Hernández.

== Music ==
The Cuban folk singer Silvio Rodríguez composed a song called Playa Girón, dedicated to the fishermen in a boat with that name in which he worked from 1969 to 1970. This song was later included in the album Dias y Flores (Days & Flowers), published in 1975. However, the Playa Girón theme has a double meaning. It refers to both the boat and the conflict won by Cuban government forces. Not to be confused with Prelude Giron, another song by Silvio Rodríguez that also addresses the issue of the Bay of Pigs invasion. Another possible explanation, suggested by the lyrics themselves, is that the song is a reference to the preludes of the infamous Quinquenio Gris, the Grey Quinquennial.

== Gallery ==
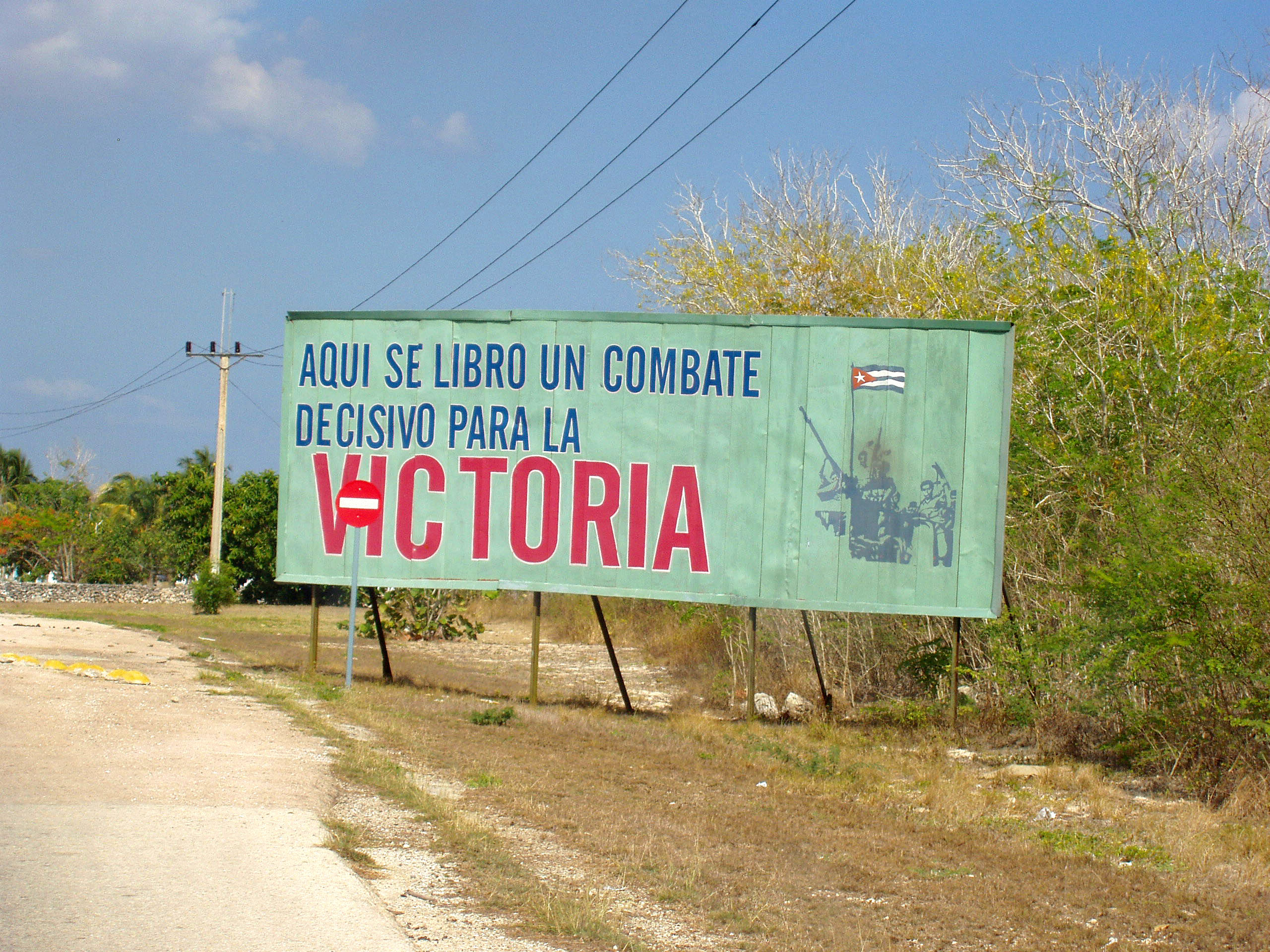
A roadside billboard in Playa Girón celebrating Cuban victory in 1961

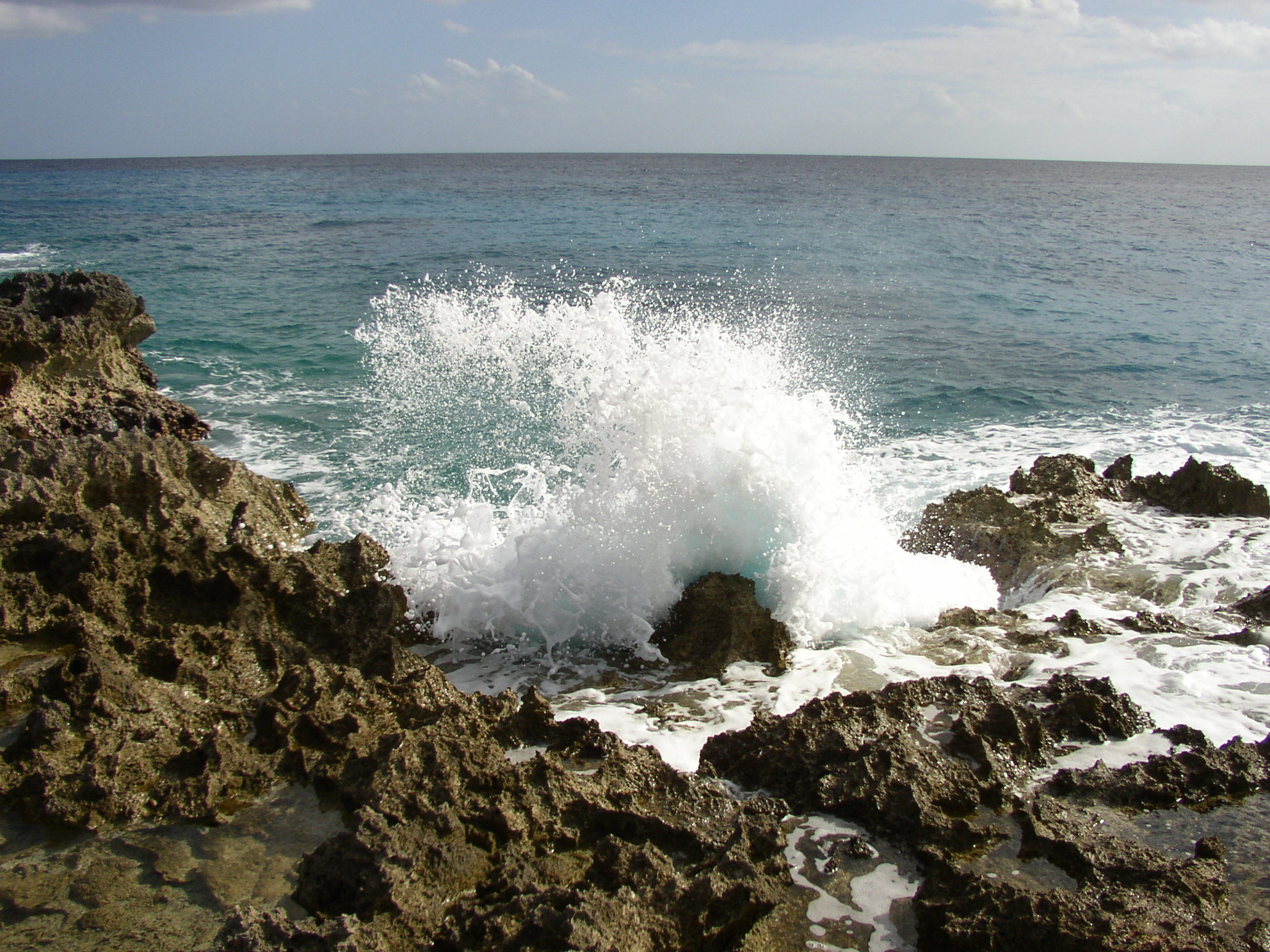
The surf breaking on the rocks of the Playa Girón

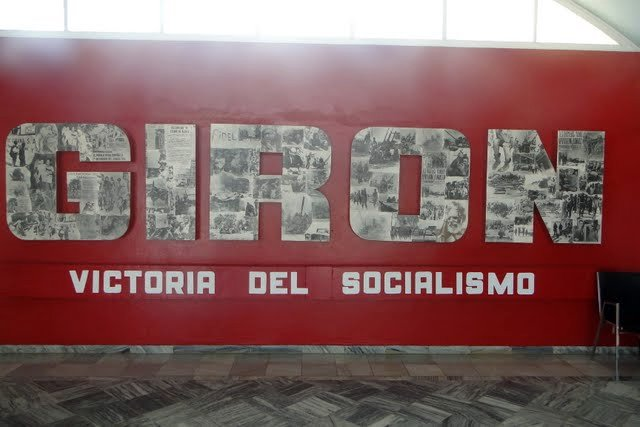
'Victory of Socialism' political poster

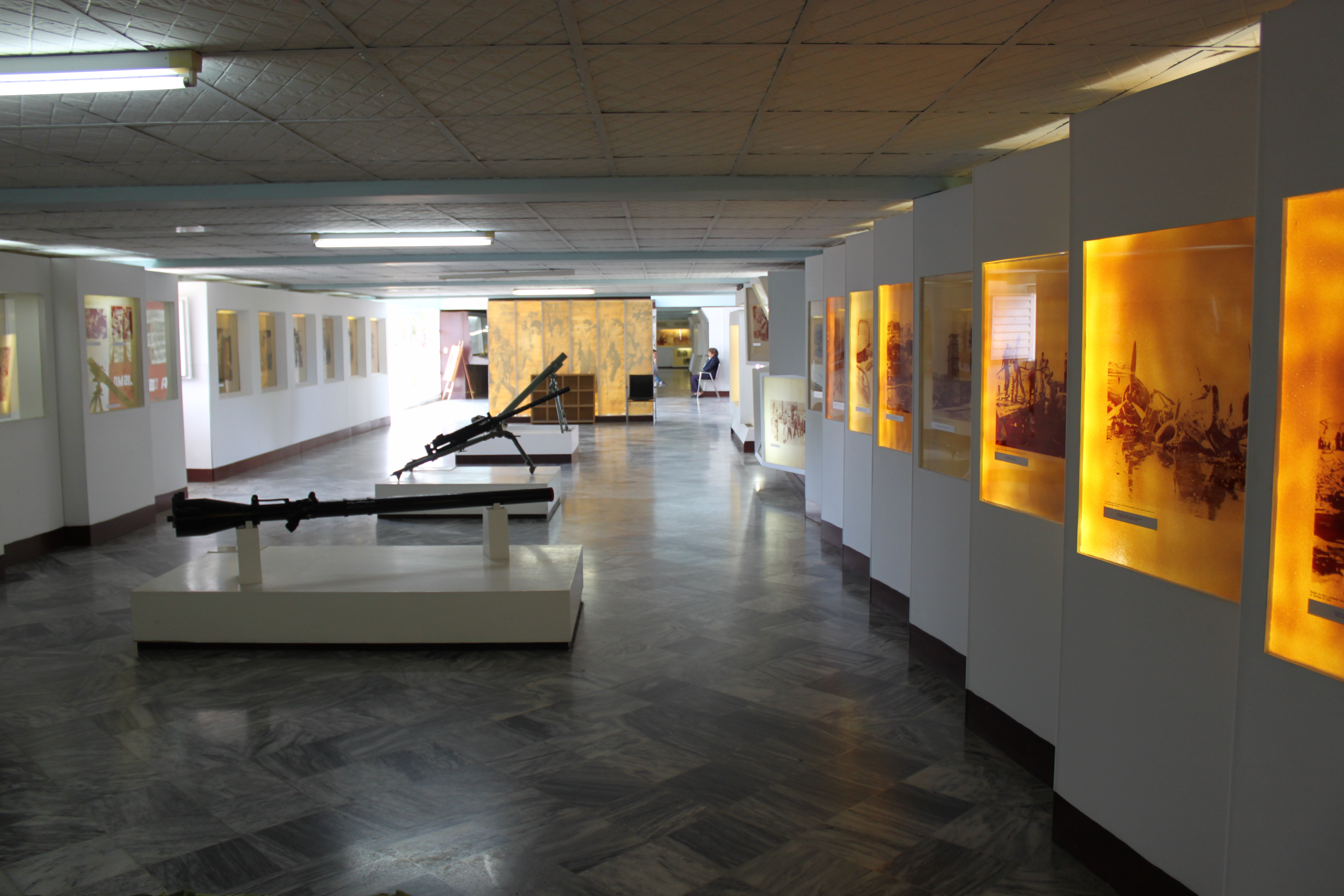
A view down the hall of the Museo of Playa Giróm

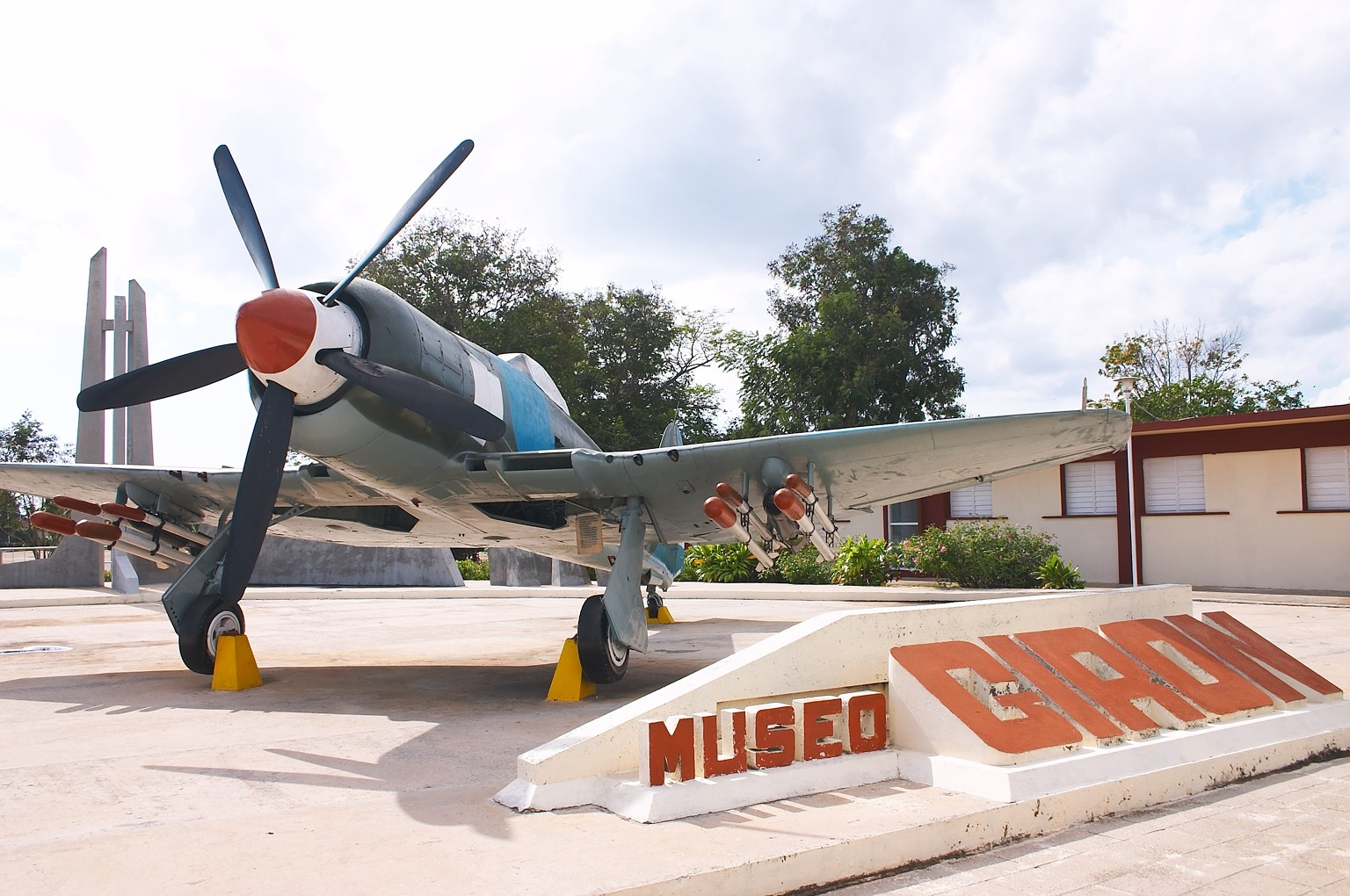
A Hawker Sea Fury FB.11 - these were refurbished Fleet Air Arm airframes

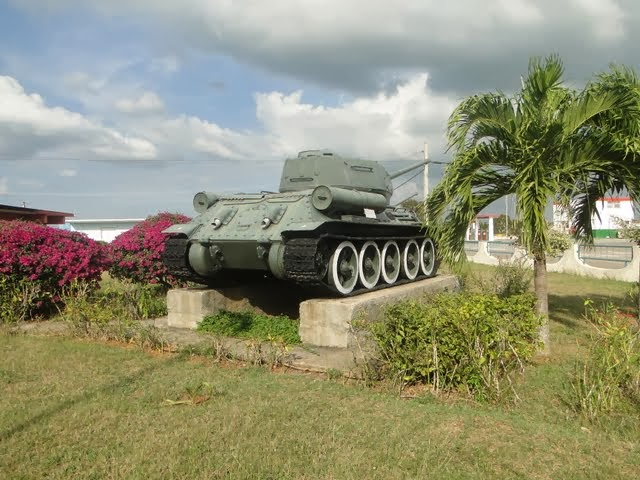
A Soviet-made T-34-85 tank

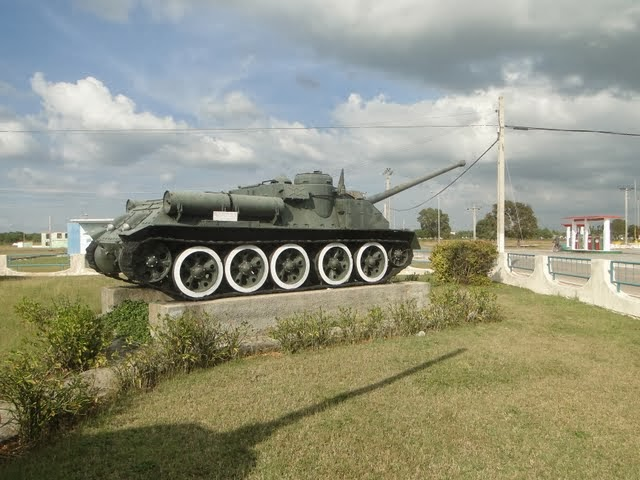
A Soviet SU-100 tank destroyer

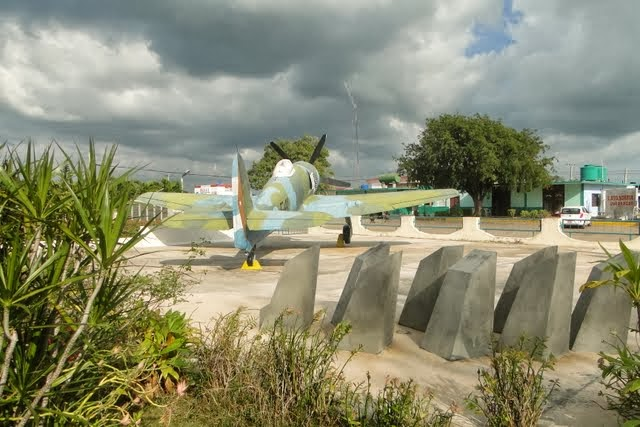
The same Sea Fury viewed from the rear

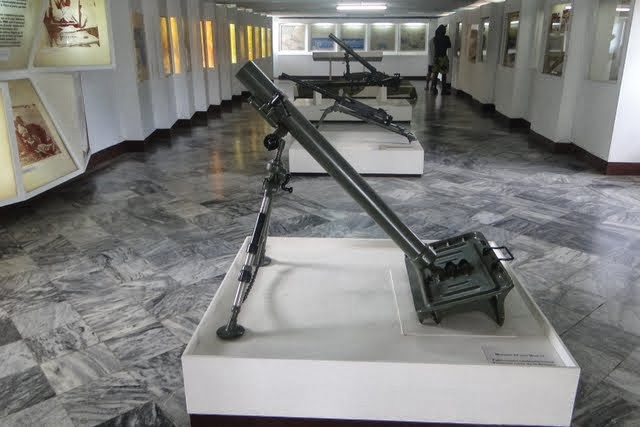
A mortar and baseplate in the museum

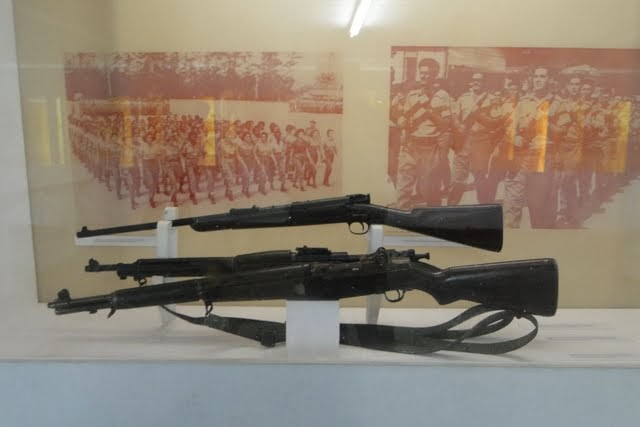
Rifles in a display case

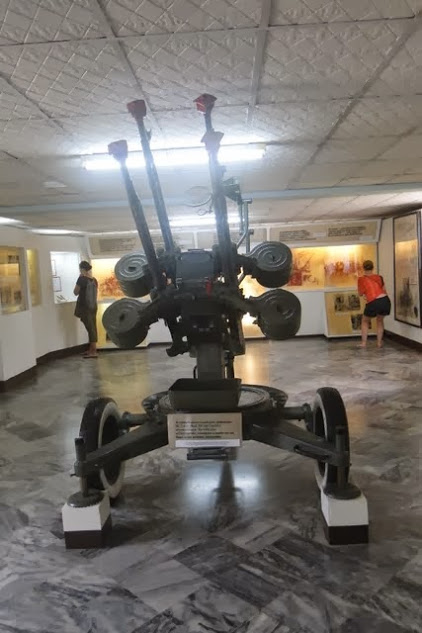
A quad towed mount DShK AA

== Bibliography ==
- Rodriguez, Juan Carlos. 1999. Bay of Pigs and the CIA. Ocean Press. Melbourne. ISBN 1-875284-98-2

== See also ==
- Geography of Cuba
