= Nueva Paz Municipal Museum =

Museum in Cuba

- Museo Municipal de Nueva Paz
- Established: 14 December 1980
- Location: Nueva Paz, Cuba

Nueva Paz Municipal Museum is a museum located in the 15th avenue in Nueva Paz, Cuba. It was established on 14 December 1980.

The museum holds collections on history, weaponry, archeology and ethnography.

== See also ==
- List of museums in Cuba
