= Ciénaga de Zapata =

Ciénaga de Zapata Zapata Swamp
- Municipality
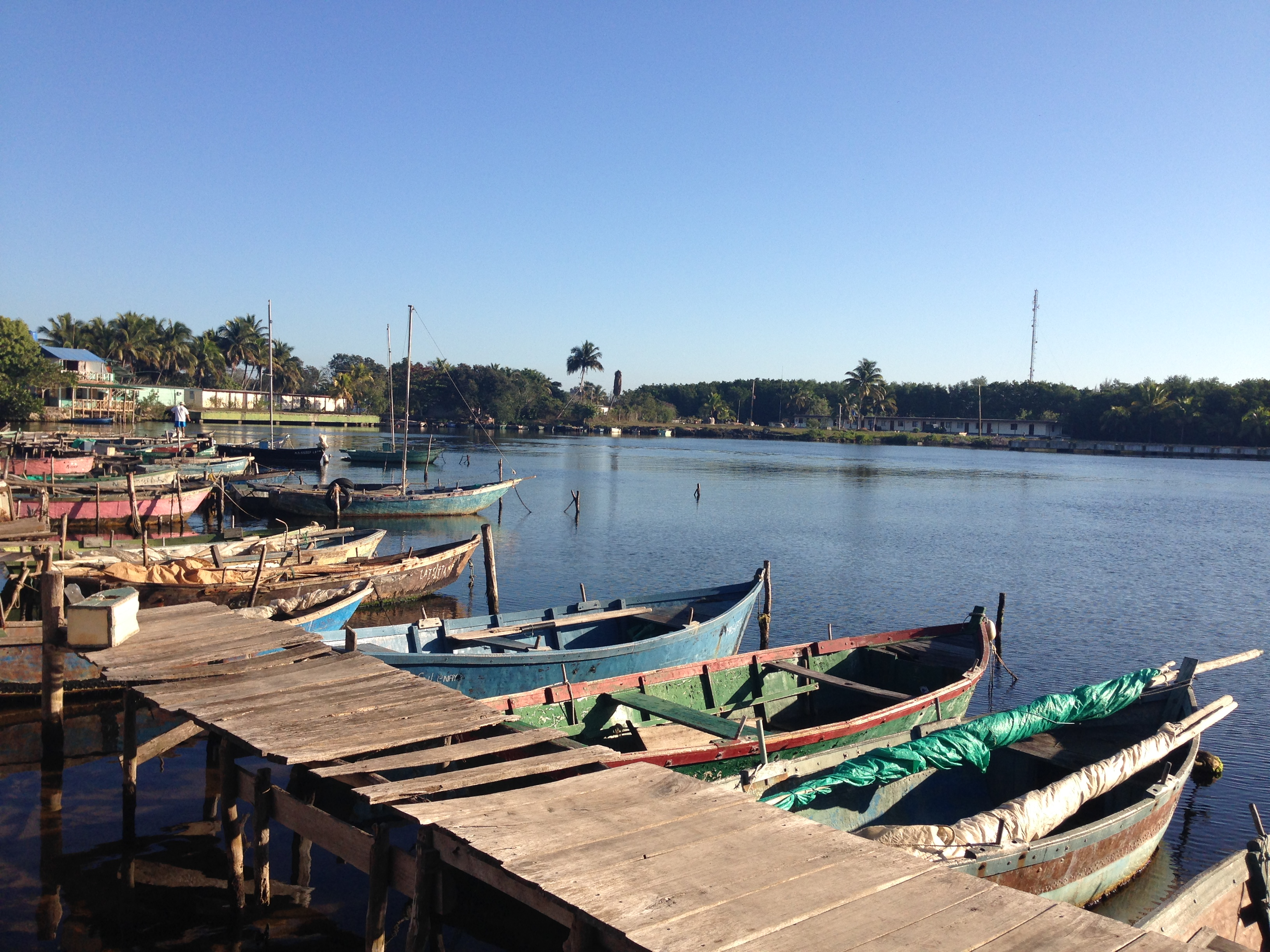
- Playa Larga

- Flag Coat of arms

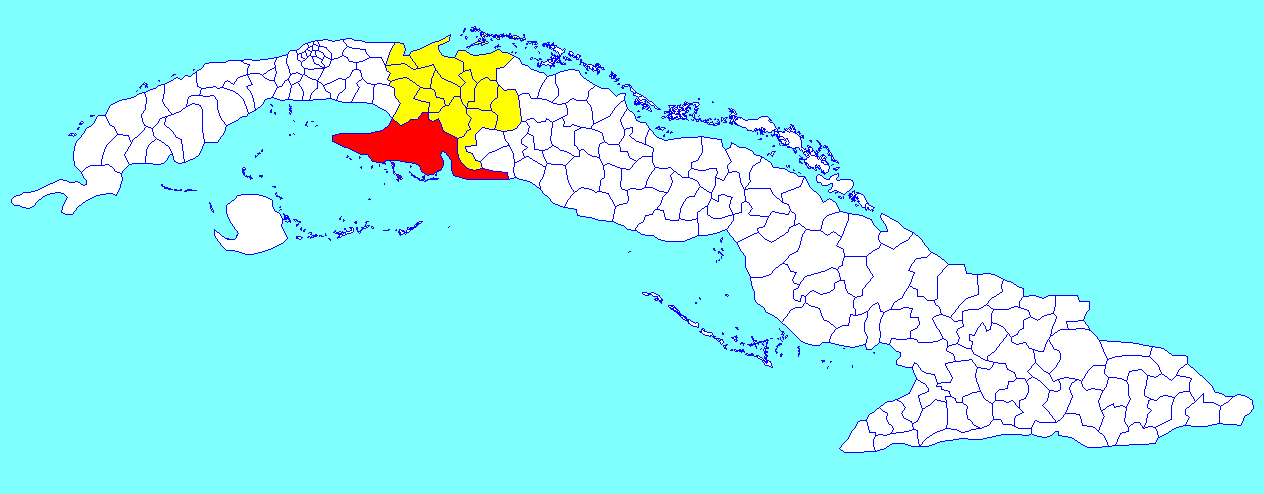
- Ciénaga de Zapata municipality (red) within Matanzas Province (yellow) and Cuba
- Coordinates: 22°17′N 81°13′W
- Country: Cuba
- Province: Matanzas
- Seat: Playa Larga

Government
  - President: Yuriet Estévez Gutiérrez

Area
  - Total: 4,162 km^{2} (1,607 sq mi)
- Elevation: 5 m (16 ft)

Population (2022)
  - Total: 10,394
  - Density: 2.497/km^{2} (6.468/sq mi)
- Time zone: UTC-5 (EST)
- Area code: +53-52
- Website: www.cenagueros.gob.cu

Ciénaga de Zapata is one of 14 municipalities of the Matanzas Province, Cuba, and the municipal seat is located at Playa Larga, at the northern end of the Bahia de Cochinos ("Bay of Pigs"). A large part of the municipality is protected as the Zapata Swamp, after which the municipality is named.

With an area of 4,162 square kilometres (1,607 sq mi), it is the largest municipality of Cuba.

Among the villages included in the municipal territory, one of the most famous is Playa Girón, site of the Bay of Pigs Invasion in 1961. Other villages are Bermejas, Buenaventura, Caleta del Rosario, Caleta Sábalo, El Jiquí, El Maíz, El Rincón, Guamá, Guasasa, Helechal, La Ceiba, La Florestal, La Salina, Maneadero, Palpite, Playa Maceo, Playa Maquina, San Blás, San Lázaro, Santo Tomás, and Sopillar.

In 2022, the municipality of Cienaga de Zapata had a population of 10,394. With a total area of 4,162 km^{2} (1,607 sq mi), it has a population density of 2.5/km^{2} (6.5/sq mi).
