= Calimete =

- Municipality
- Coat of arms

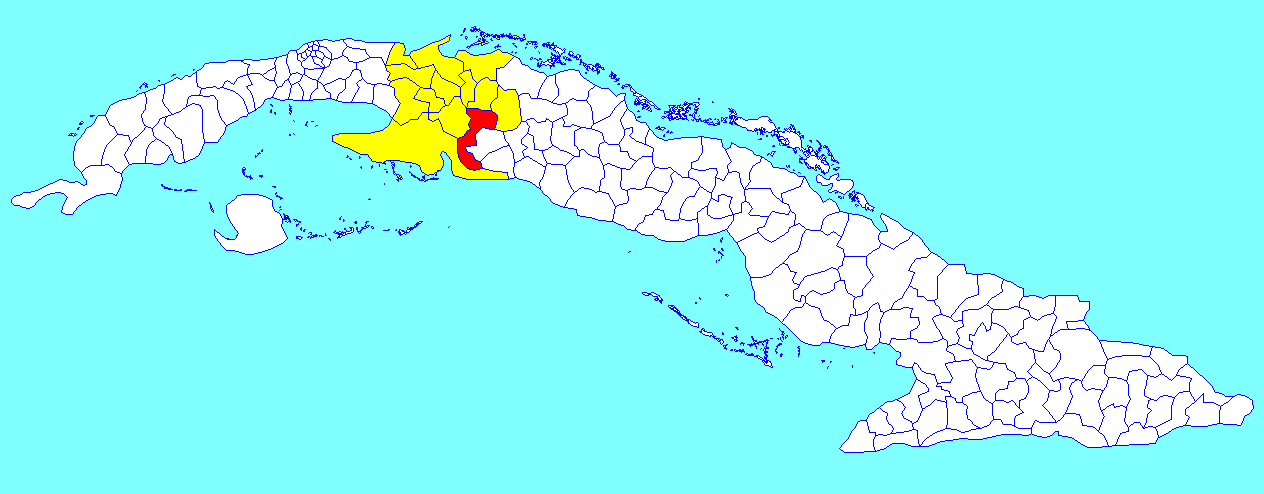
- Calimete municipality (red) within Matanzas Province (yellow) and Cuba
- Coordinates: 22°32′2″N 80°54′35″W
- Country: Cuba
- Province: Matanzas
- Founded: 1867
- Established: 1976

Area
  - Total: 958 km^{2} (370 sq mi)
- Elevation: 30 m (98 ft)

Population (2022)
  - Total: 27,210
  - Density: 28.4/km^{2} (73.6/sq mi)
- Time zone: UTC-5 (EST)
- Area code: +53-52
- Website: https://www.calimetenses.gob.cu/en/

Calimete is a municipality and town in the Matanzas Province of Cuba. It was founded in 1867 by José Antonio Castañeda.

== Demographics ==
In 2022, the municipality of Calimete had a population of 27,210. With a total area of 958 km^{2} (370 sq mi), it has a population density of 31.0/km^{2} (80/sq mi).

== See also ==
- Municipalities of Cuba
- List of cities in Cuba
