= Pedro Betancourt =

Pedro Betancourt Betancourt
- Municipality
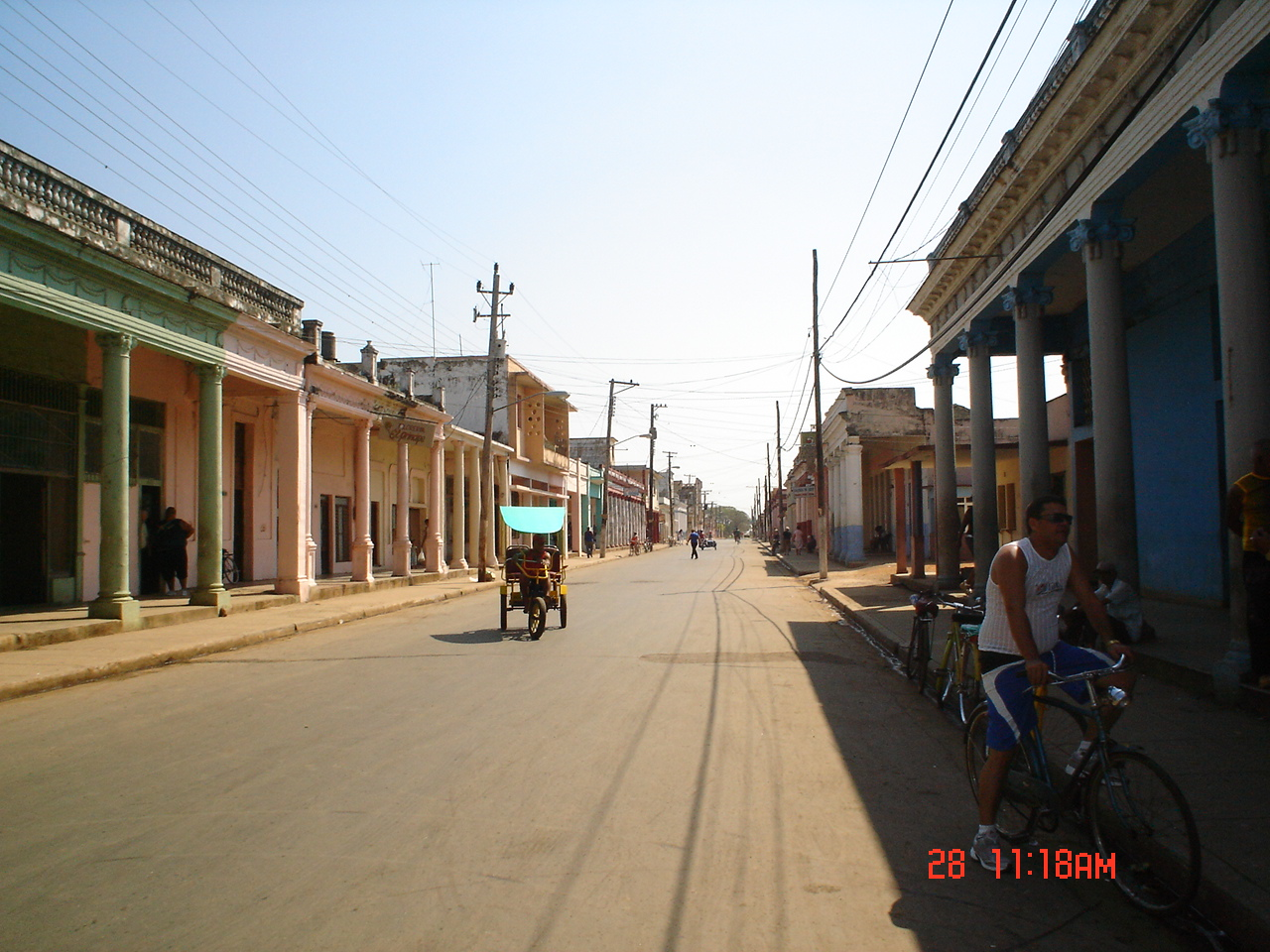

- Seal Coat of arms

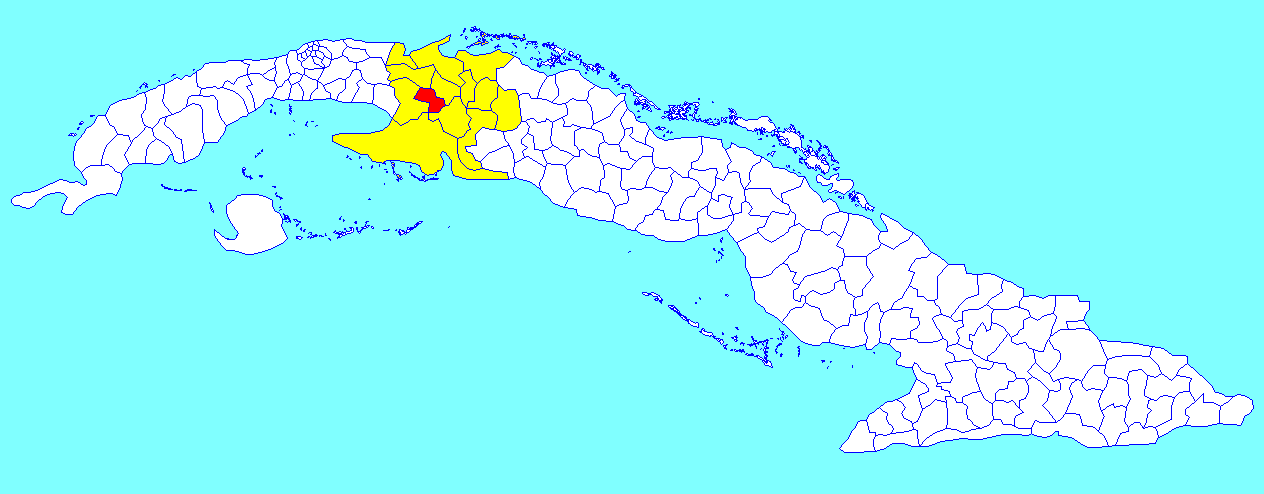
- Pedro Betancourt municipality (red) within Matanzas Province (yellow) and Cuba
- Coordinates: 22°43′49″N 81°17′27″W
- Country: Cuba
- Province: Matanzas
- Founded: 1833
- Established: 1879

Area
  - Total: 388 km^{2} (150 sq mi)
- Elevation: 25 m (82 ft)

Population (2022)
  - Total: 29,565
  - Density: 76.2/km^{2} (197/sq mi)
- Time zone: UTC-5 (EST)
- Area code: +53-52

Pedro Betancourt, sometimes shortened as Betancourt, is a municipality and town in the Matanzas Province of Cuba. It is located in the center of the province, west of Jagüey Grande and east of Unión de Reyes. It was founded in 1833.

== History ==
Its original name was Corral Falso de Macurijes. Pedro Betancourt's name comes from a famous Spanish-Cuban patriot, Pedro Estanislao Betancourt Dávalos, who was one of the Major-General in the independence war, waged by the Cuban natives against the Spanish Crown.

== Geography ==
The municipality was historically divided into the barrios of Cabecera Norte, Cabecera Sur (both constituting the town), Ciego, Linche, Navajas, Platanal, Punta Brava, Torriente and Tramojos. Nowadays it counts the town itself and 7 popular councils (consejos populares, i.e. villages): The main town of Betancourt and the villages of Bolondrón, Camilo, Güira de Macurijes, Manolito, Navajas and Pedroso-Socorro.

== Demographics ==
In 2022, the municipality of Pedro Betancourt had a population of 29,565. With a total area of 388 km^{2} (150 sq mi), it has a population density of 76/km^{2} (200/sq mi).

== Sister towns ==
- Nuevo San Juan Parangaricutiro, Mexico

== See also ==
- Municipalities of Cuba
- List of cities in Cuba
