= Unión de Reyes =

- Municipality
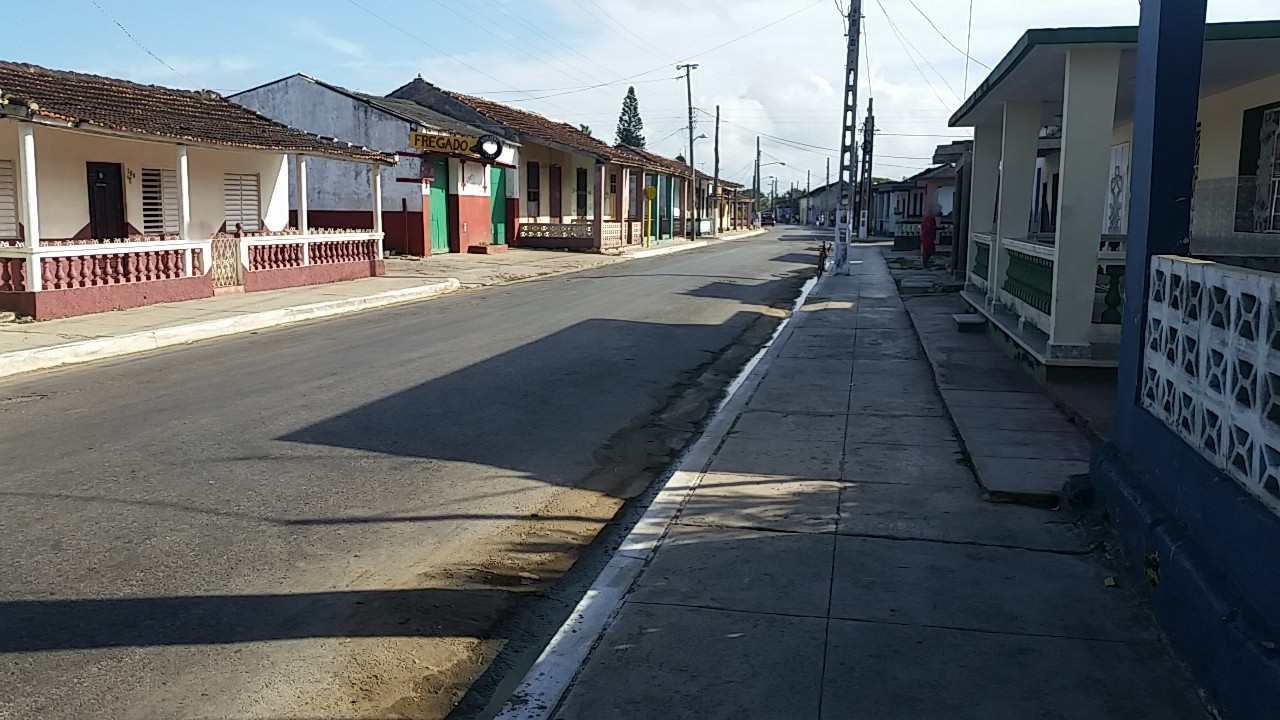

- Coat of arms

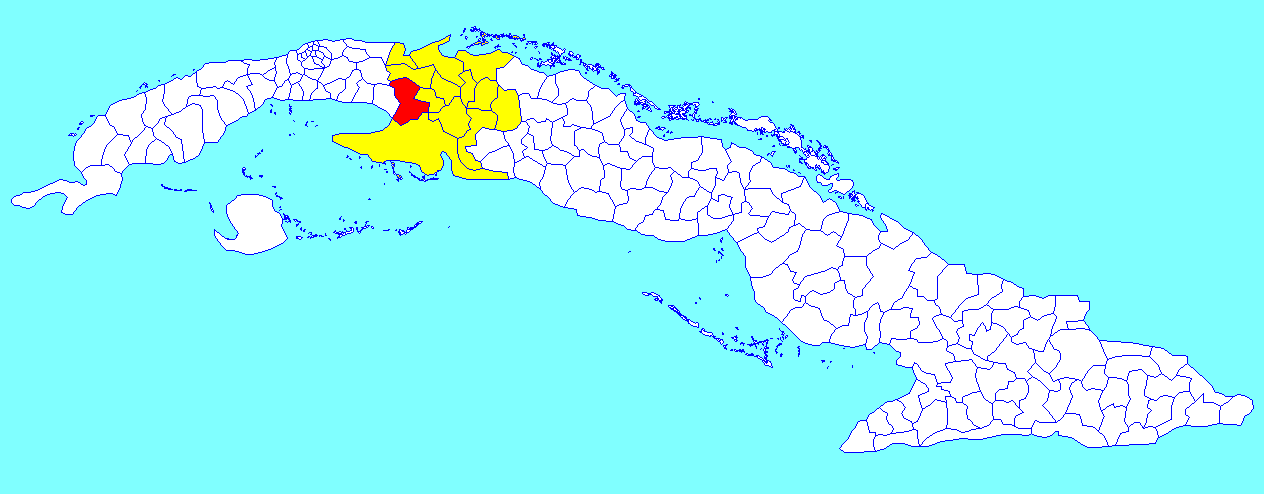
- Unión de Reyes municipality (red) within Matanzas Province (yellow) and Cuba
- Coordinates: 22°48′1″N 81°32′14″W
- Country: Cuba
- Province: Matanzas
- Founded: 1844
- Established: July 1, 1879

Area
  - Total: 856 km^{2} (331 sq mi)
- Elevation: 55 m (180 ft)

Population (2022)
  - Total: 35,021
  - Density: 40.9/km^{2} (106/sq mi)
- Time zone: UTC-5 (EST)
- Area code: +53-52

Unión de Reyes is a municipality and town in the Matanzas Province of Cuba. It is located in the western part of the province, 30 kilometres (19 mi) south of Matanzas, the provincial capital.

== History ==
Unión de Reyes was founded in 1844, and it was established as a municipality on July 1, 1879. Its name derives from Unión en el Punto de Reyes, so named for its location at a railway junction.

== Geography ==
The municipality, originally divided into the barrios of Iglesia and Unión, is divided into 9 consejos populares (i.e. "people's councils"): the town of Unión de Reyes and the villages of Alacranes, Bermejas, Cabezas, Cidra, Estante, Juan Ávila, Juan G. Gómez and Puerto Rico.

== Demographics ==
In 2022, the municipality of Unión de Reyes had a population of 35,021. With a total area of 856 km^{2} (331 sq mi), it has a population density of 41/km^{2} (110/sq mi).

== See also ==
- Municipalities of Cuba
- List of cities in Cuba
