= Nueva Paz =

- Municipality
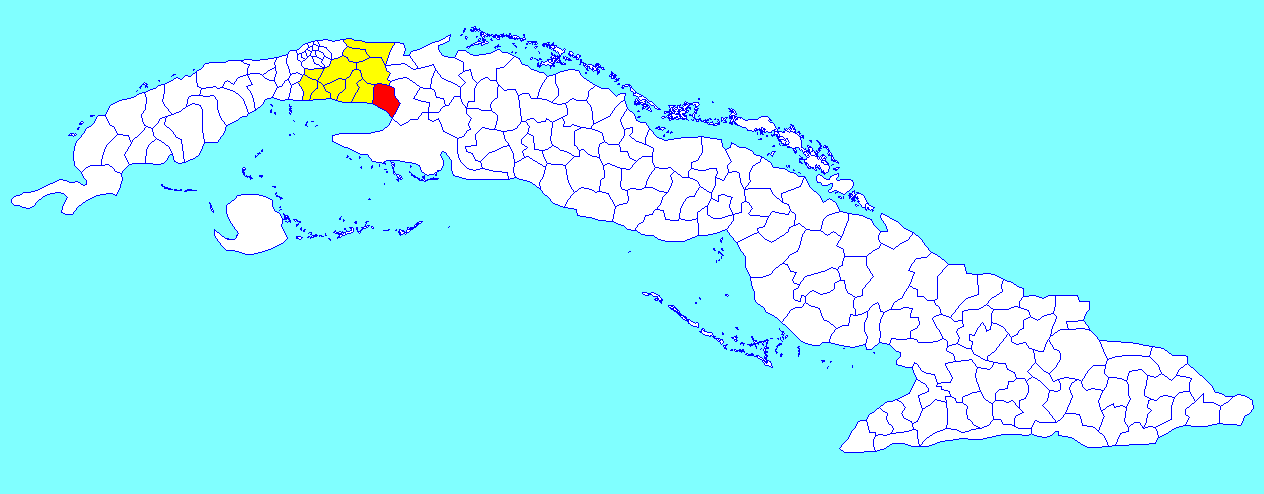
- Nueva Paz municipality (red) within Mayabeque Province (yellow) and Cuba
- Coordinates: 22°45′48″N 81°45′29″W
- Country: Cuba
- Province: Mayabeque
- Founded: 1802
- Established: 1812 (Municipality)

Area
  - Total: 515 km^{2} (199 sq mi)
- Elevation: 20 m (66 ft)

Population (2022)
  - Total: 23,002
  - Density: 44.7/km^{2} (116/sq mi)
- Time zone: UTC-5 (EST)
- Area code: +53-7

Nueva Paz (Spanish pronunciation: [ˈnweβa pas]; lit. 'New Peace') is a municipality and town in the Mayabeque Province of Cuba. It was founded in 1802.

== Geography ==
The municipality is divided into 8 consejos populares (i.e. "people's councils): the town of Nueva Paz and the villages of Bagáez, Jagua, Navarra, Palos, San Luis, Las Vegas and Yaya.

== Demographics ==
In 2022, the municipality of Nueva Paz had a population of 24,277. With a total area of 515 km^{2} (199 sq mi), it has a population density of 45/km^{2} (120/sq mi).

== Transport ==
Nueva Paz is served by the A1 motorway, the Autopista Nacional, linking Havana to Santa Clara and Sancti Spíritus. The villages of Vegas and Palos are served by a line of the Havana Suburban Railway.

== See also ==
- Nueva Paz Municipal Museum
- Municipalities of Cuba
- List of cities in Cuba
