= Aguada de Pasajeros =

- Municipality
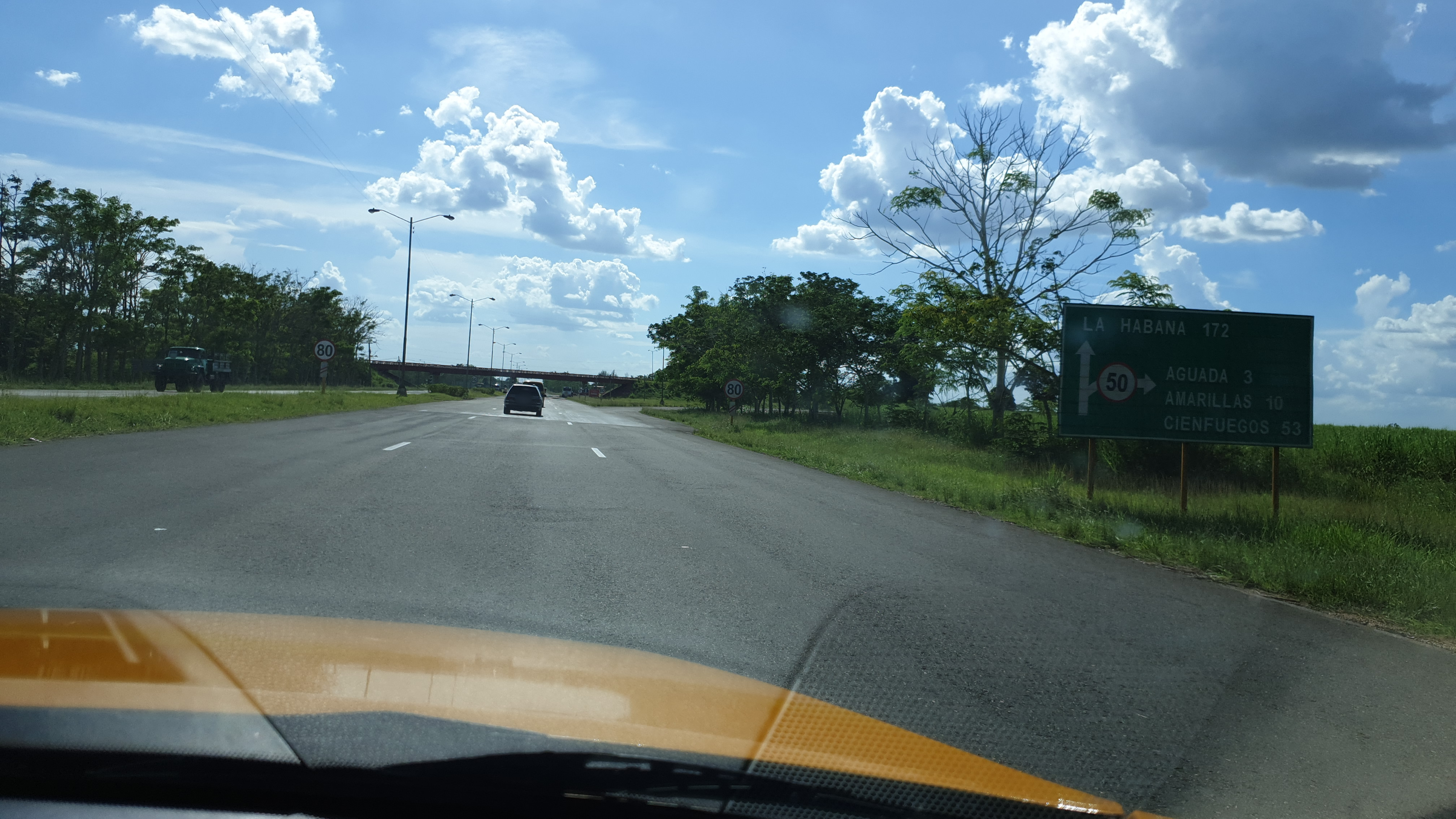
- Exit on the Autopista A1, in the municipality, to get into the main town of Aguada de Pasajeros

- Coat of arms

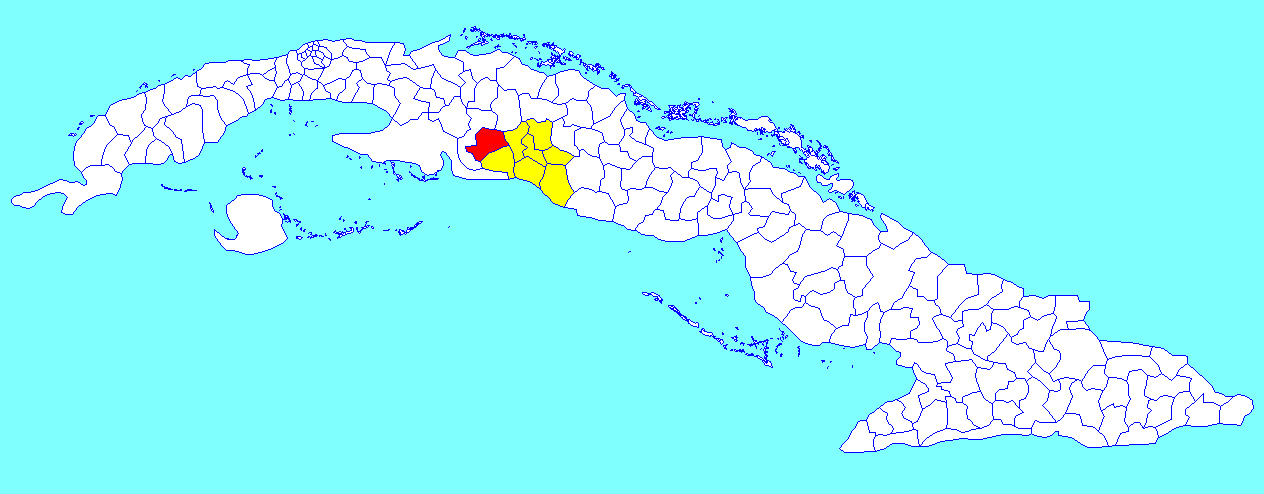
- Aguada municipality (red) within Cienfuegos Province (yellow) and Cuba
- Coordinates: 22°23′5″N 80°50′46″W
- Country: Cuba
- Province: Cienfuegos

Area
  - Total: 680 km^{2} (260 sq mi)
- Elevation: 25 m (82 ft)

Population (2022)
  - Total: 31,279
  - Density: 46/km^{2} (120/sq mi)
- Time zone: UTC-5 (EST)
- Area code: +53-432
- Website: https://aguadadepasajeros.gob.cu/

Aguada de Pasajeros (Spanish pronunciation: [aˈɣwaða ðe pasaˈʝeɾos]) is a municipality and town in the Cienfuegos Province of Cuba.

== Geography ==
The municipality is divided into the town of Aguada and the villages of Carreño, Real Campiña, Covadonga and Perseverancia. Yaguaramas, now part of Abreus municipality, was part of it until the 1977 administrative reform.

== Demographics ==
In 2022, the municipality of Aguada de Pasajeros had a population of 31,279. With a total area of 680 km^{2} (260 sq mi), it has a population density of 46/km^{2} (120/sq mi).

== Transport ==
The town is served by the A1 motorway and counts a train station on a line linking Havana to Cienfuegos.

== Notable people ==
- Valentín Menéndez, Lieutenant Colonel of the Cuban Liberation Army.
- Jose Ramón Muñiz, Cuban composer and poet.
- Claudio Lliraldi, Last elected municipal mayor.
- Tomás Sánchez, Visual artist, lives in Costa Rica.
- Henry Ballate, Visual artist, lives in exile in New York.

== See also ==
- Municipalities of Cuba
- List of cities in Cuba
