= Matanzas Province =

Province of Cuba

- Province of Cuba
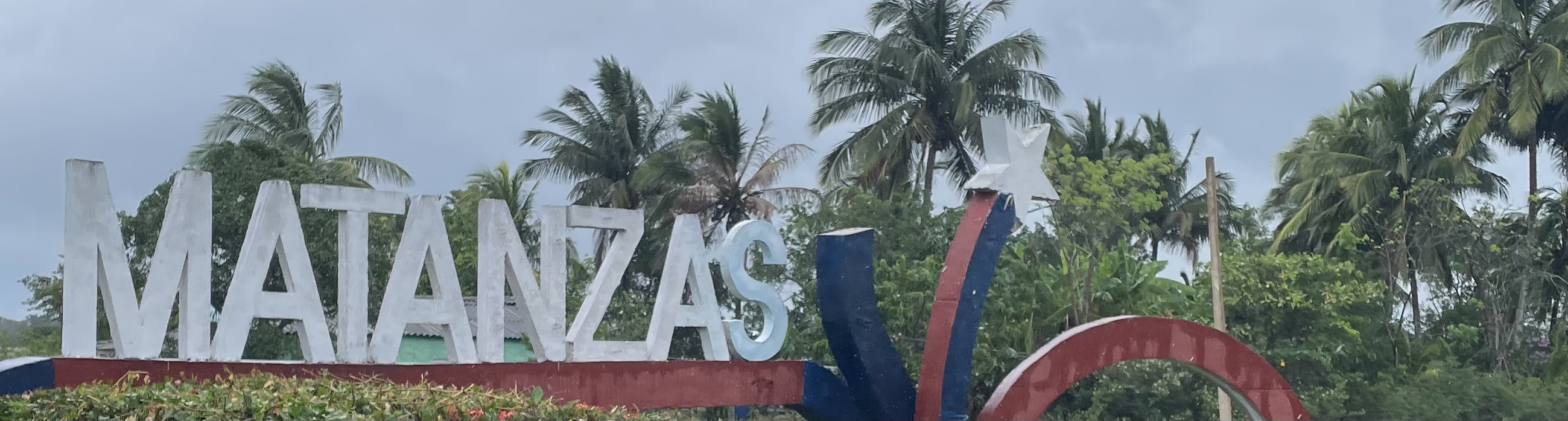
- Sign seen when entering the Province

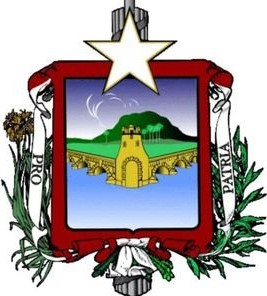
- Coat of arms

- Country: Cuba
- Capital: Matanzas

Government
  - President: Mario Felipe Sabines Lorenzo

Area
  - Total: 11,798.02 km^{2} (4,555.24 sq mi)

Population (2021-12-31)
  - Total: 710,127
  - Density: 60.1904/km^{2} (155.892/sq mi)
- Time zone: UTC-5 (EST)
- Area code: +53-52
- ISO 3166 code: CU-04
- HDI (2019): 0.789 high · 4th of 16
- Website: www.matanceros.gob.cu/es

Matanzas (Latin American Spanish pronunciation: [maˈtansas]) is one of the provinces of Cuba. Major towns in the province include Cárdenas, Colón, Jovellanos and the capital of the same name, Matanzas. The resort town of Varadero is also located in this province.

Among Cuban provinces, Matanzas is one of the most industrialized, with petroleum wells, refineries, supertanker facilities, and 21 sugar mills to process the harvests of the fields of sugarcane in the province.

== Geography ==
The second largest province in Cuba, Matanzas is largely flat, with its highest point (Pan de Matanzas) at only 380m above sea level.

The northwestern coast is largely rocky, with a few beaches, while the northeastern coast has numerous small cays of its coast (part of Sabana-Camaguey Archipelago), and scrubland and mangroves near the shoreline. Cuba's northernmost point is located on the Hicacos Peninsula.

The southern coast has one of Cuba's most distinctive features: an enormous marsh, Ciénaga de Zapata, that covers both the southern part of the province and the Zapata Peninsula. East of the peninsula lies the Bay of Pigs, the site of the failed U.S.-backed invasion.

== Municipalities ==
From 1976 to 2010, Matanzas was subdivided into 14 municipalities. Starting from 2011, the municipality of Varadero was abolished and merged to Cárdenas. Thus, Matanzas now has 13 municipalities.

| Municipality | Population (2004) | Population (2022) | Area (km²) | Location | Remarks |
|---|---|---|---|---|---|
| Calimete | 29,736 | 27,210 | 958 | 22.53389°N 80.90972°W | |
| Cárdenas | 103,087 | 158,332 | 566 | 23.04278°N 81.20361°W | |
| Cienaga de Zapata | 10,394 | 10,394 | 4,320 | 22.28806°N 81.19750°W | Playa Larga |
| Colón | 71,579 | 68,021 | 597 | 22.72250°N 80.90639°W | |
| Jagüey Grande | 57,771 | 59,600 | 882 | 22.52944°N 81.13250°W | |
| Jovellanos | 58,685 | 57,216 | 505 | 22.81056°N 81.19778°W | |
| Limonar | 25,421 | 26,708 | 449 | 22.95611°N 81.40861°W | |
| Los Arabos | 25,702 | 23,111 | 762 | 22.74000°N 80.71583°W | |
| Martí | 23,475 | 21,582 | 1,070 | 22.95250°N 80.91667°W | |
| Matanzas | 143,706 | 163,631 | 317 | 23.05139°N 81.57500°W | Province capital |
| Pedro Betancourt | 32,218 | 29,565 | 388 | 22.73056°N 81.29083°W | |
| Perico | 31,147 | 29,746 | 278 | 22.77528°N 81.01500°W | |
| Unión de Reyes | 40,022 | 35,021 | 856 | 22.80056°N 81.53694°W | |
| Varadero | 24,681 | see Cárdenas | 32 | 23.13972°N 81.28611°W | Abolished in 2010 |
| | 677,624 | 710,127 | | | |

Source: Population from 2004 Census. Area from 1976 municipal re-distribution.

== Demographics ==
In 2004, the province of Matanzas had a population of 675,980. With a total area of 11,802.72 km^{2} (4,557.06 sq mi), the province had a population density of 57.3/km^{2} (148/sq mi).
