= Autopista A1 (Cuba) =

Motorway in Cuba

Autopista A1
- Autopista Nacional
- National Motorway
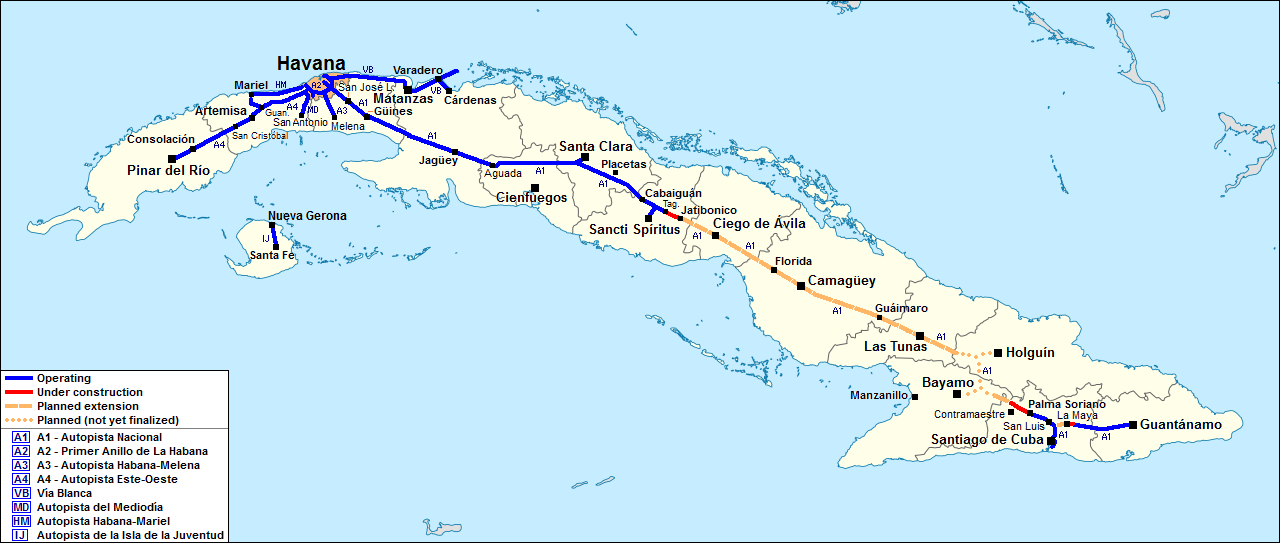
- Map of the Cuban motorway network

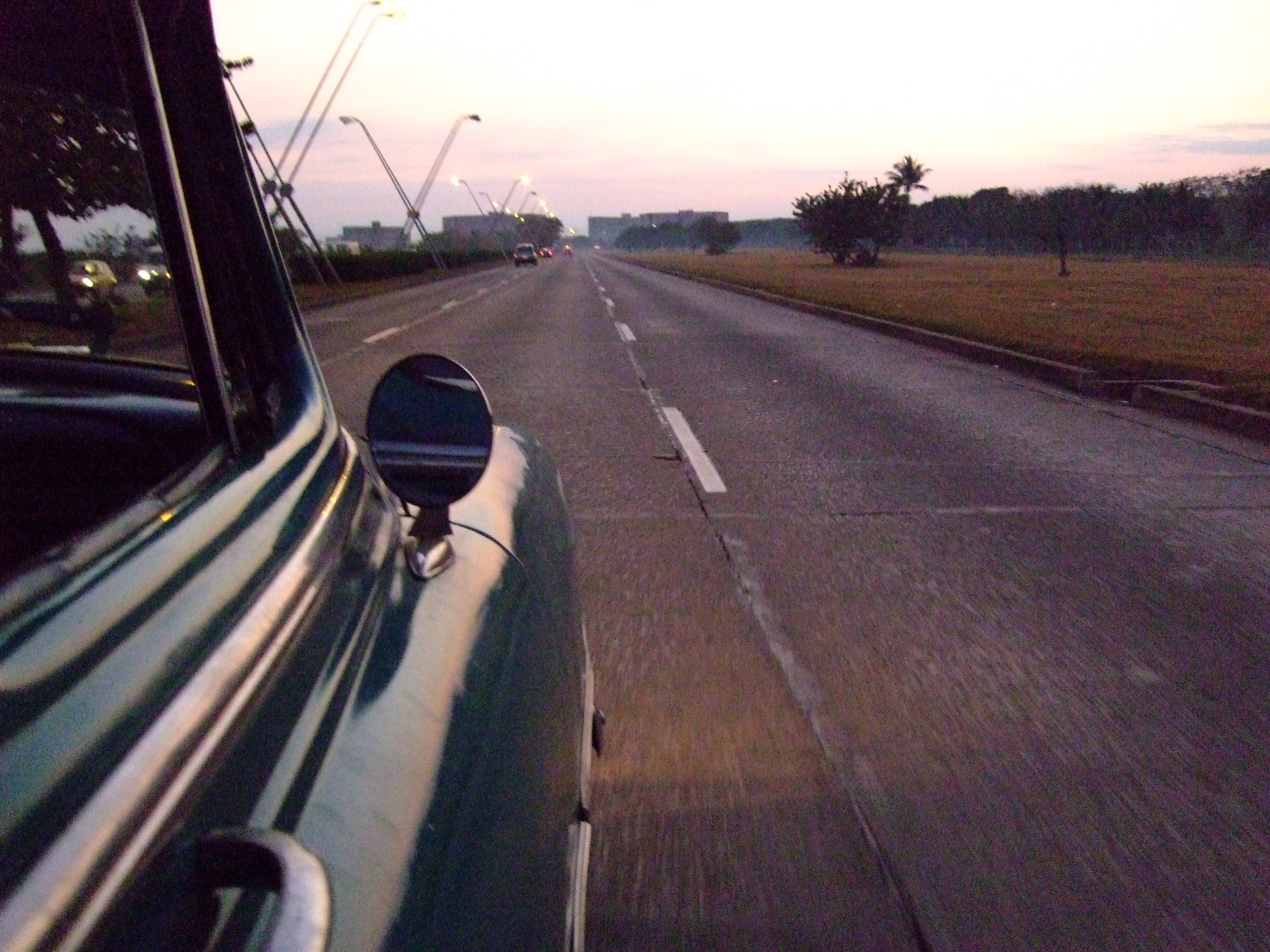
- View of the A1 in Havana

Route information
- Length: 900 km (560 mi)
- Existed: 1979–present

Major junctions
- West end: Calle Central / Avenida Ciudamar in Rocafort
- A2 near La Yuca; 2–400 near Alberro; 2–N–1 in Morales; 4–I–2 near Aguada de Pasajeros; 4–112 near Ranchuelo; A1–1 near El Mamey 120; 4–N–1 near Punta de Diamantes; 4–531; Majá–Taguasco Road To 4–N–1; 6–371 near Palma Soriano; 6–N–1 near Dos Caminos; Santiago Beltway in Santiago de Cuba
- East end: 6–571 / West Beltway in Guantanamo

Location
- Country: Cuba
- Major cities: Havana, San José de las Lajas, Güines, Jagüey Grande, Aguada de Pasajeros, Santa Clara, Placetas, Cabaiguán, Sancti Spíritus, Jatibonico, Ciego de Ávila, Florida, Camagüey, Guáimaro, Las Tunas, Holguín, Bayamo, Contramaestre, Palma Soriano, San Luis, Santiago de Cuba, La Maya, Guantánamo

Highway system
- Roads in Cuba

The Autopista A1, also known as Autopista Nacional, is a Cuban motorway, partly built, that will link Havana to Guantánamo. It is a toll-free road and its total length will be about 900 km (560 mi). Along with the Autopista A4, linking Havana to Pinar del Río, it is classified as part of the whole Autopista Nacional route, spanning the length of the island; as the Carretera Central highway.

== History ==
The motorway, connected to the A4 via the Havana Ringroad (A2), was opened in 1979 from Havana to Santa Clara. Additional sections (2 in the Oriental region) were opened during the 1980s, but further work was interrupted in 1990 as the economic crisis of the "Special Period" (Spanish: Período especial) developed.

== Route ==
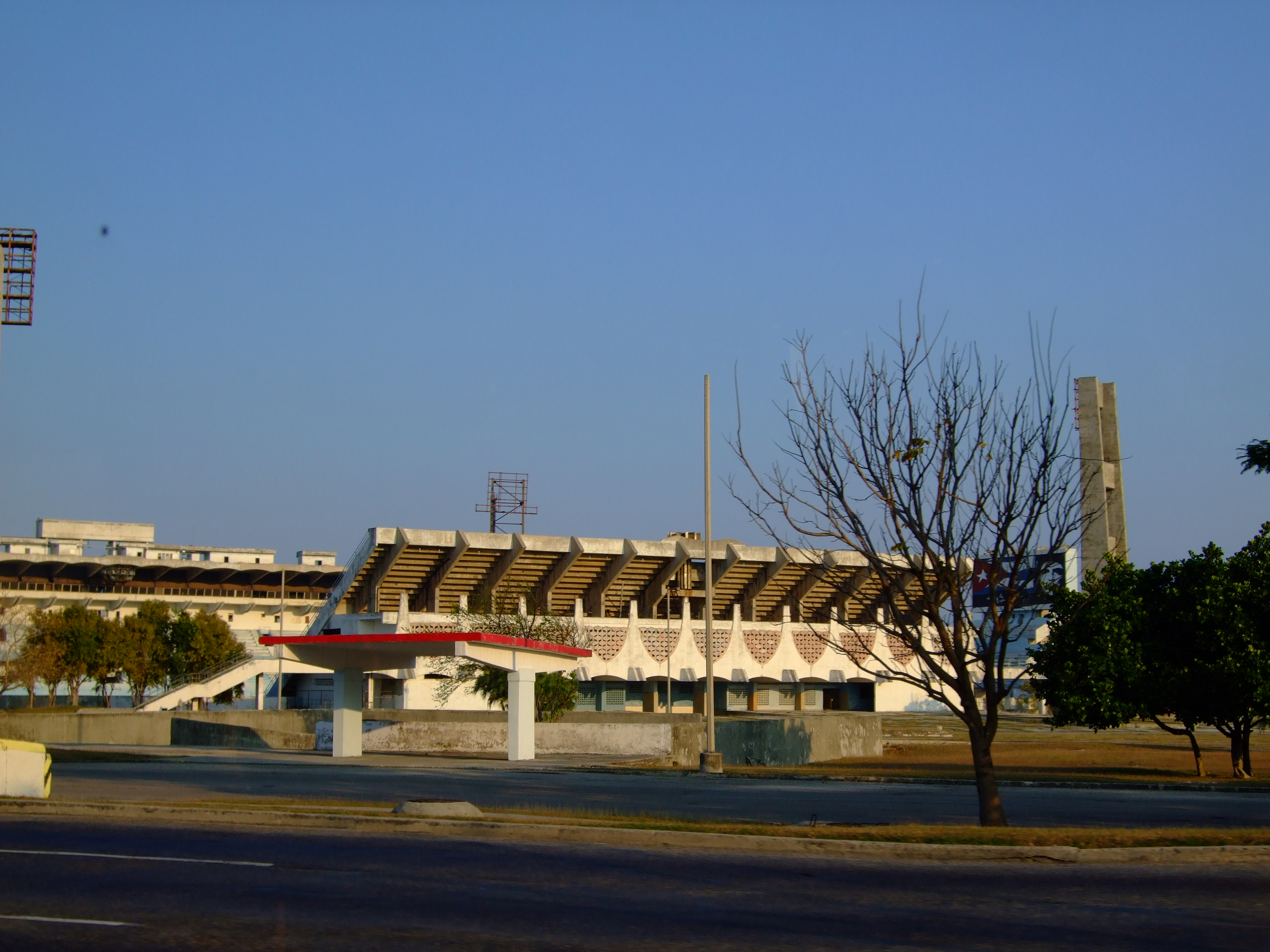
The A1 in Havana, next to a baseball stadium

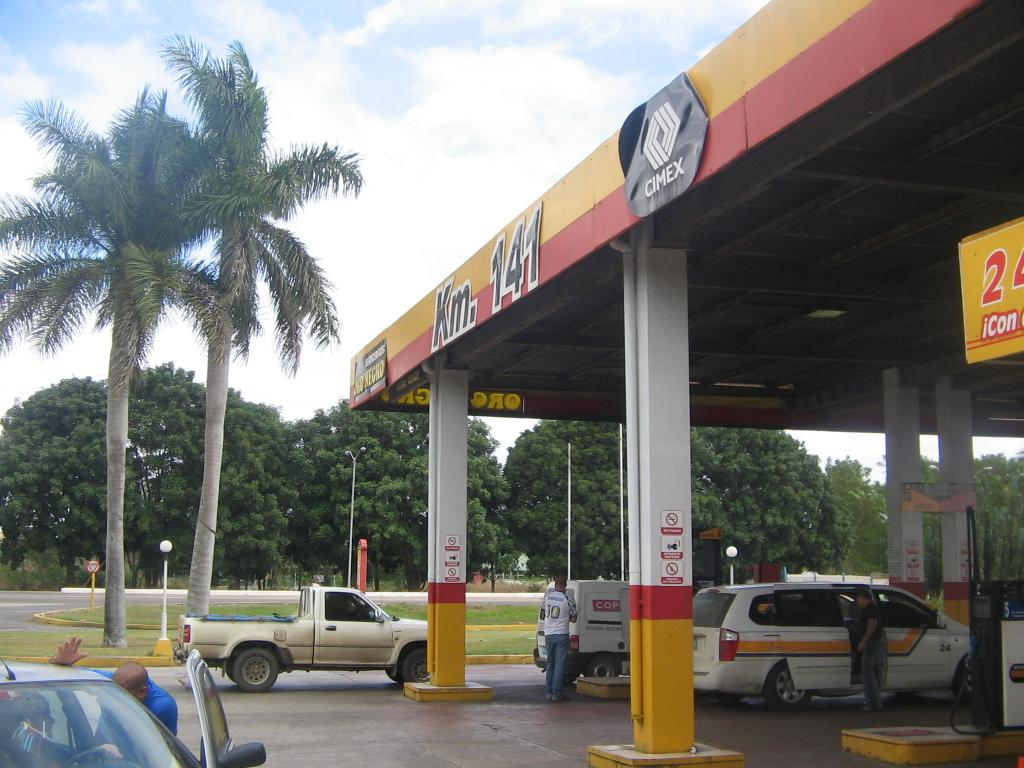
The rest area "Kilómetro 141", in Jagüey Grande

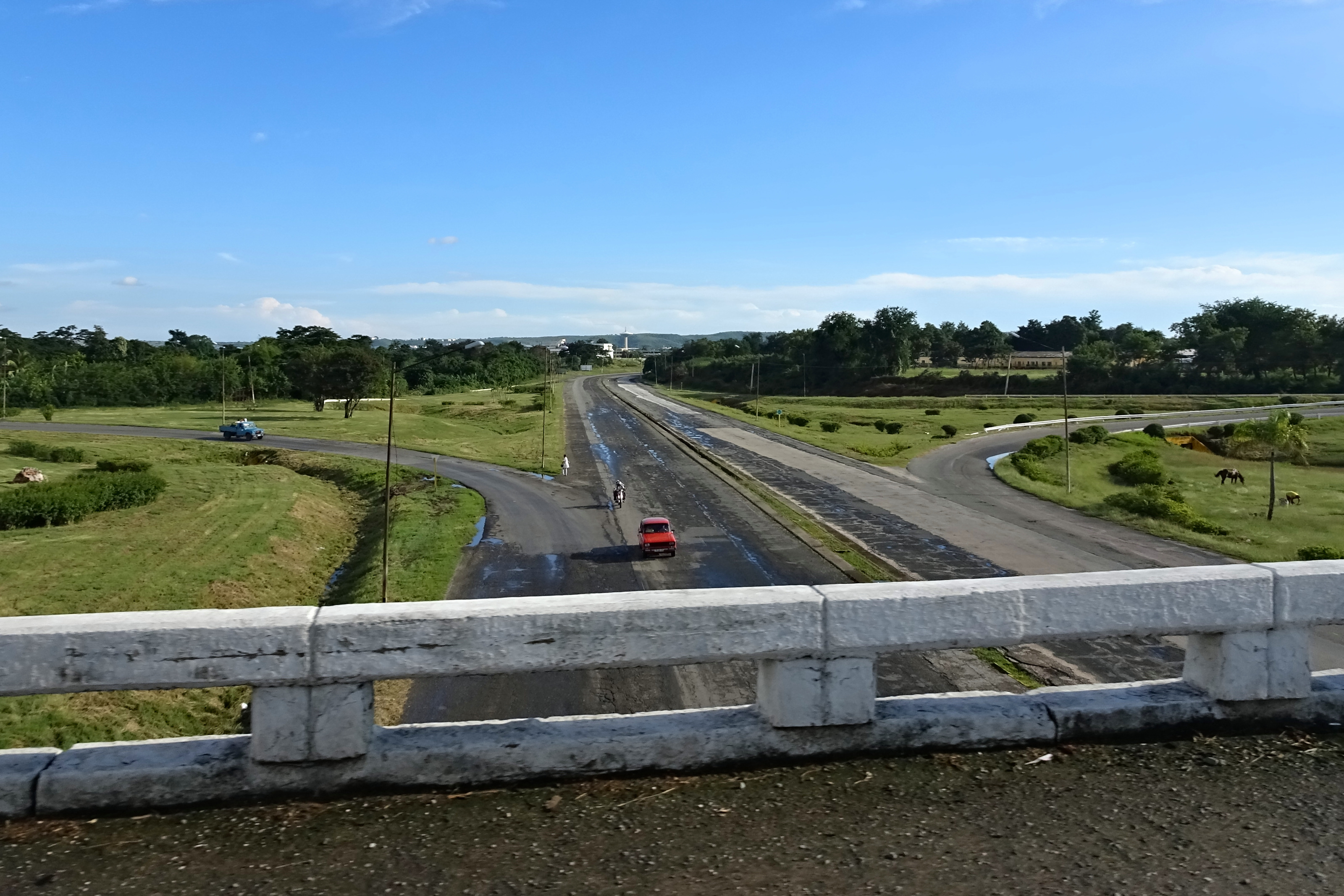
The A1 at Santiago de Cuba

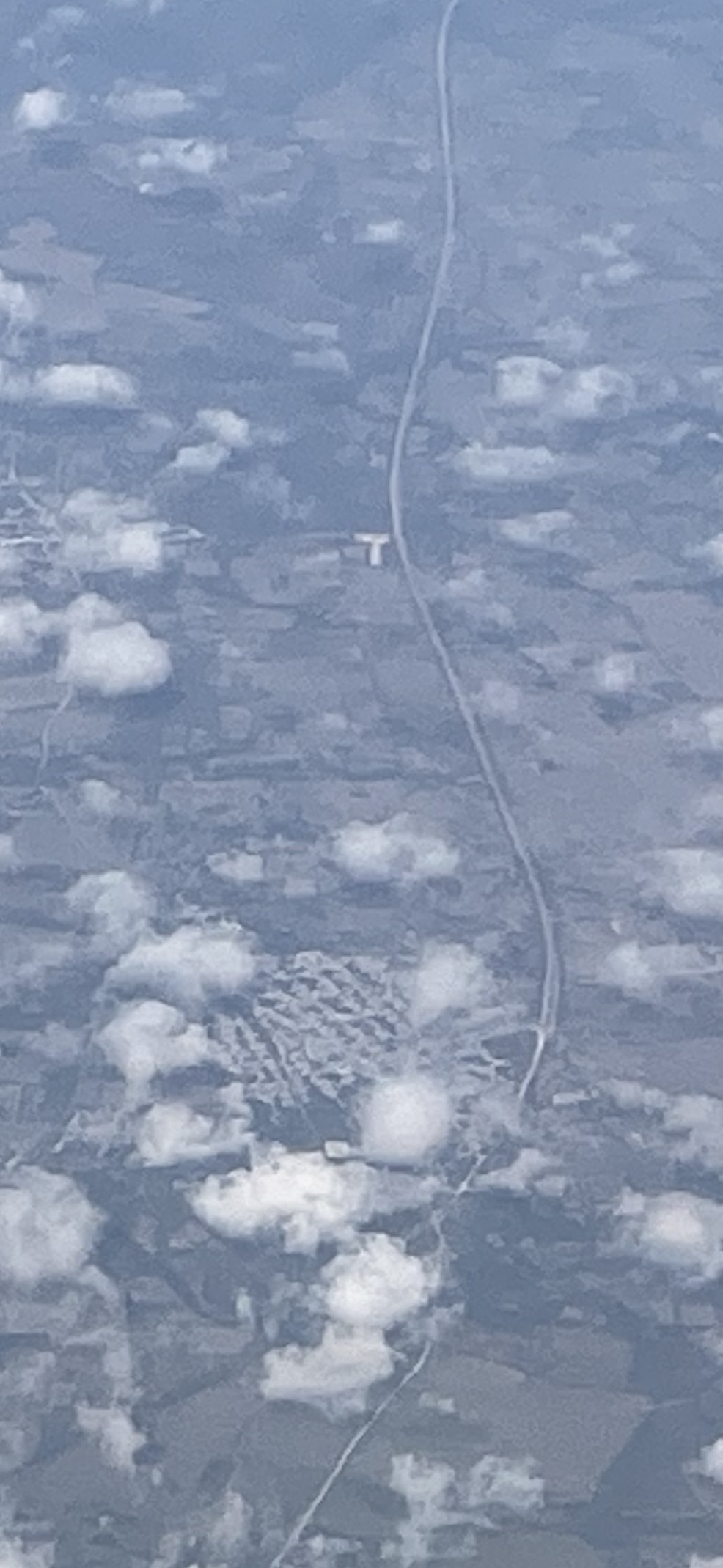
The end of the A1 in Taguasco from above

The A1, the longest motorway on the island, is a dual carriageway with 6 lanes (8 from Havana to San José de las Lajas), and has some at-grade intersections with rural roads. The operating sections are the Havana-Santa Clara-Sancti Spíritus-Taguasco (354 km, main section), Palma Soriano-Santiago de Cuba (53 km) and La Maya-Guantánamo (41 km, sharing the Carretera Central route for 9 km).

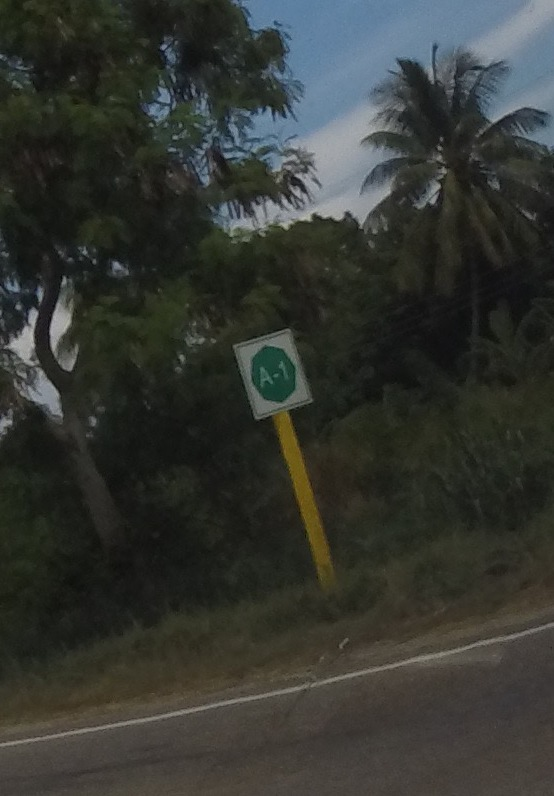
Sign used for the A1, seen in San Miguel del Padrón, Havana

From the exit "Santa Clara-Manicaragua" to Taguasco, the A1 operates with a single carriageway, and from Taguasco to Jatibonico, it is under construction. Other sections under construction, both in Santiago de Cuba Province, are the one from Contramaestre to Palma Soriano, and the one from La Maya to the Palma-Santiago section, ending with the construction of a future interchange. The other section, passing through the provinces of Ciego de Ávila, Camagüey, Las Tunas, Holguín and Granma, has been planned.

AUTOPISTA A1 (Autopista Nacional)
Exit	↓km↓	Province	Note
Habana Centro	0.0	Havana	
Habana San Miguel	0.4	Havana	
Habana Coyula	2.1	Havana	
Habana Carretera del Pitirre	4.6	Havana	
Primer Anillo (Havana Ringroad) (link to Havana-Pinar and other motorways)	6.1	Havana	
Habana Santa María del Rosario	8.3	Havana	
Habana Cotorro	12.2	Havana	
Tapaste-Pedro Pi	18.5	Mayabeque	
San José de las Lajas (Jamaica - Universidad Agraria)	22.6	Mayabeque	
Jaruco-Zenea (to San José de las Lajas south)	28.2	Mayabeque	
Catalina de Güines (to Madruga and the Carretera Central)	31.2	Mayabeque	
Güines	42.8	Mayabeque	
San Nicolás de Bari	51.2	Mayabeque	
Rest area "Paladar de Lisette" (eastbound); Rest area "Paladar de Daisy" (westbound)	54.1	Mayabeque	
Rest area "La Cocina Criolla"	59.8	Mayabeque	
Vegas (to San Nicolás, on the Circuito Sur)	63.0	Mayabeque	
Nueva Paz	71.0	Mayabeque	
Rest area "Kilómetro 79"	79.0	Mayabeque	
Unión de Reyes	91.0	Matanzas	
Bolondrón	104.0	Matanzas	
Torriente-Pedro Betancourt	127.0	Matanzas	
Varadero-Crimea (road to Varadero via Jovellanos and Cárdenas)	135.0	Matanzas	
Rest area "Kilómetro 141"	141.2	Matanzas	
Jagüey Grande (to the Ciénaga de Zapata)	141.2	Matanzas	
Calimete	164.0	Matanzas	
Rest area "Policentro"	171.8	Cienfuegos	
Aguada de Pasajeros (to Cienfuegos and Circuito Sur)	172.0	Cienfuegos	
Las Cajas	183.0	Cienfuegos	
Cinco de Septiembre-Turquino	206.0	Cienfuegos	
Cartagena-Rodas	213.0	Cienfuegos	
Piragua	213.0	Cienfuegos	
Lajas	232.0	Cienfuegos	
Ranchuelo (to Cienfuegos)	249.0	Villa Clara	
Santa Clara ( 6-km ringroad to Santa Clara city center)	261.0	Villa Clara	
Santa Clara-Manicaragua	270.0	Villa Clara	
Báez-Guaracabulla	296.0	Villa Clara	1 cgw.
Placetas-Fomento	302.0	Villa Clara	1 cgw.
Cabaiguán-Placetas (Carretera Central)	323.0	Sancti Spíritus	1 cgw.
Cabaiguán	329.0	Sancti Spíritus	1 cgw.
Guayos	332.0	Sancti Spíritus	1 cgw.
Sancti Spíritus–Yaguajay ( 10-km motorway to Sancti Spíritus city center)	336.0	Sancti Spíritus	
Zaza del Medio	343.0	Sancti Spíritus	1 cgw.
Siguaney	349.0	Sancti Spíritus	1 cgw.
Taguasco	354.0	Sancti Spíritus	1 cgw.
Jatibonico (under construction)	365.0	Sancti Spíritus	
Jatibonico–Camagüey–Holguín–Contramaestre section (planned: listed possible future exits)
Majagua (planned)		Ciego de Ávila	
Jicotea (planned)		Ciego de Ávila	
Ciego de Ávila (planned) (to Morón)	407 (ca.)	Ciego de Ávila	
Baraguá-Colorado (planned)		Ciego de Ávila	
Gaspar (planned)		Ciego de Ávila	
Céspedes (planned)		Camagüey	
Florida (planned)		Camagüey	
Camagüey Oeste (planned)		Camagüey	
Camagüey Este (planned)	512 (ca.)	Camagüey	
Jimaguayú (planned)		Camagüey	
Siboney (planned)		Camagüey	
Sibanicú (planned)		Camagüey	
Cascorro (planned)		Camagüey	
Guáimaro (planned)		Camagüey	
Bartle-Jobabo (planned)		Las Tunas	
Las Tunas (planned)	620 (ca.)	Las Tunas	
Calixto (planned)		Las Tunas	
Majibacoa (planned)		Las Tunas	
Buenaventura (planned)		Holguín	
Holguín-Maceo (planned, not finalized) (possible ringroad to Holguín city center)	673 (ca.)	Holguín	
Cacocum (planned, not finalized)		Holguín	
Cauto Cristo (planned, not finalized)		Granma	
Bayamo-Babiney (planned, not finalized) (to Manzanillo, possible ringroad to Bayamo city center)	713 (ca.)	Granma	
Jiguaní (planned, not finalized)		Granma	
Contramaestre–Palma–San Luis–Santiago section
Contramaestre (under construction)	0.0 (738 ca.)	Santiago	
Laguna Blanca (under construction)	5.9	Santiago	
Oriente (under construction)	18.2	Santiago	
Candonga (under construction)	22.9	Santiago	
Palma Soriano-Dos Ríos	29.2	Santiago	1 cgw.
Palma Soriano	32.2 (770 ca.)	Santiago	1 cgw.
Rest area	39.1	Santiago	1 cgw.
San Luis	44.6 (782 ca.)	Santiago	
Dos Caminos (Carretera Central)	52.7	Santiago	
to Guantánamo (planned)	54.0 (792 ca.)	Santiago	
El Cristo (to Guantánamo and Alto Songo)	59.6	Santiago	
Bonaito	66.3	Santiago	
Santiago Cubitas	68.2	Santiago	
Santiago Centro ( 2-km beltway to Santiago city center)	70.3 (808 ca.)	Santiago	
Santiago Universidad de Oriente	71.5	Santiago	
Santiago-El Caney	72.7	Santiago	
Santiago-Siboney	75.0	Santiago	
Santiago 30 de Noviembre	76.7	Santiago	
Santiago Chicharrones	78.4	Santiago	
Santiago Aeropuerto	82.3 (820 ca.)	Santiago	
San Luis–La Maya–Guantánamo section
to Santiago / San Luis (planned)	0.0 (792 ca.)	Santiago	
Santa Cruz (planned)	4.9	Santiago	
Alto Songo (under construction)	8.4	Santiago	
La Maya (new) (under construction)	14.4	Santiago	
La Maya	20.7 (813 ca.)	Santiago	1 cgw.
La Sabana	25.0	Santiago	1 cgw.
Los Reynaldos	28.6	Santiago	1 cgw.
La Perla	34.8	Santiago	1 cgw.
Yerba de Guinea	38.5	Santiago	CC route
Costa Rica	42.8	Guantánamo	CC route
Niceto Pérez	47.7	Guantánamo	CC route
Guantánamo Oeste	59.2	Guantánamo	
Guantánamo	61.5 (853 ca.)	Guantánamo	

== See also ==
- Roads in Cuba
- Transport in Cuba
- Infrastructure of Cuba
