= Sancti Spíritus–Yaguajay Road =

Road in Cuba

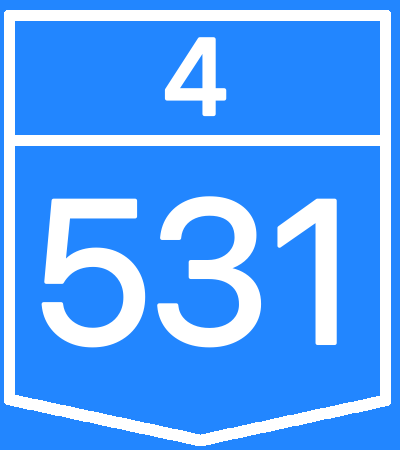
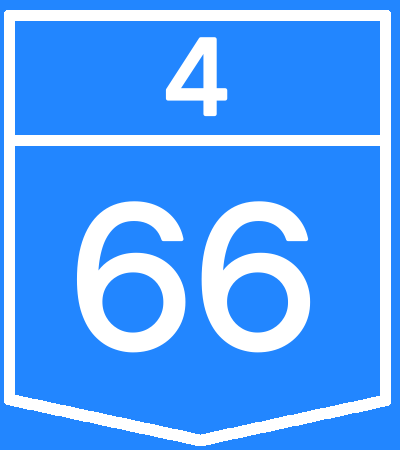
Carretera Sancti Spíritus–Yaguajay
- Sancti Spíritus–Yaguajay Road
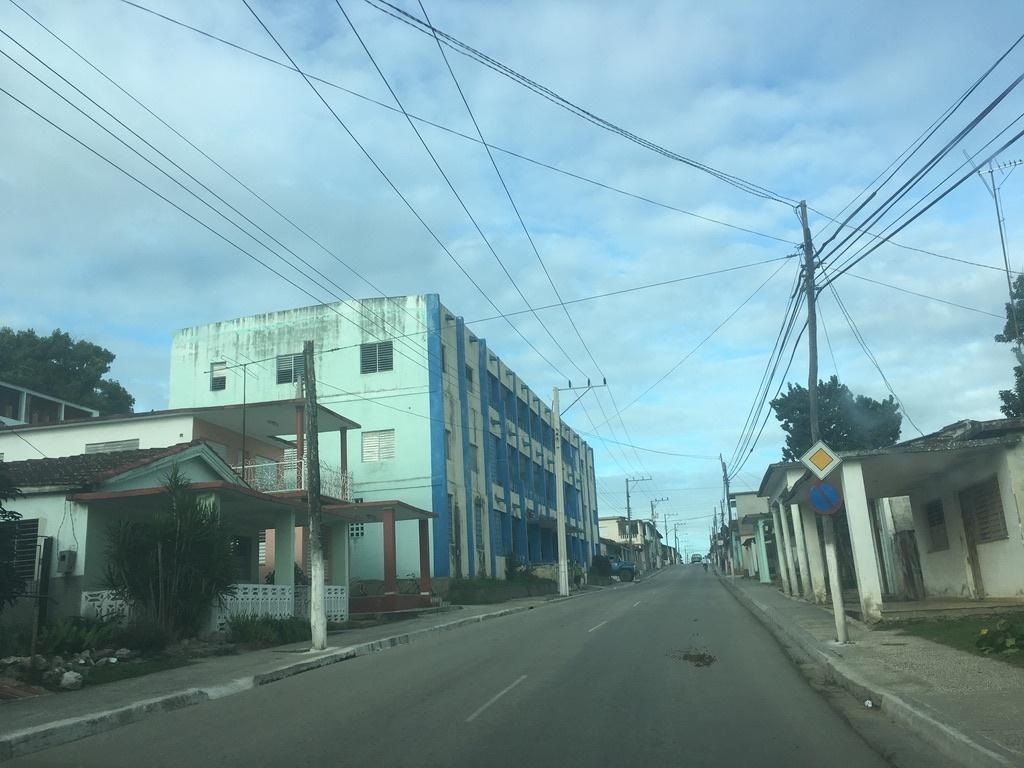
- The road in the town of Yaguajay

Route information
- Length: 53 km (33 mi)

Major junctions
- North end: 4–I–23 in Yaguajay
- A1
- South end: 4–N–1 in Sancti Spíritus

Location
- Country: Cuba
- Provinces: Sancti Spíritus
- Municipalities: Sancti Spíritus, Taguasco, Cabaiguán, Yaguajay

Highway system
- Roads in Cuba

The Sancti Spíritus–Yaguajay Road (4–531) is a north-south national highway in Sancti Spíritus Province, Cuba, connecting Sancti Spíritus to the town of Yaguajay. The road has two sections, the southern half of the road is the Circunvalación/Autopista Sancti Spíritus, the motorway section, also known as the 4-66, north of the intersection with the Autopista A1, is the regular Sancti Spíritus–Yaguajay two lane road, built before the revolution.

== History ==
In 2017, from October to November, the Autopista A1 closed past the intersection with the 4–531, for repairs, making it so you had to either go down the circunvalación Sancti Spíritus or north to Yaguajay, instead of being able to go straight until Taguasco, then ending at the Maja–Taguasco Road, which was also closed.

In 2018, there was damages in the road due to the landslides in the El Yigre area, and inter-municipal transport services where temporary closed due to the weather throughout the province.

== Route ==
The symbol indicates the motorway section.

Municipality	Location	↓km↓	Destination	Notes
Yaguajay	Yaguajay	0	4–I–23 (Calle Panchito Gómez / Circuito Norte)	
Yaguajay	Meneses	10	4–471 – Bamburanao, Zulueta	
Yaguajay		12	4–61 (Road to Iguará) – Iguará	
Yaguajay		16	Road to Florencia / Road to Itabo	
Yaguajay	Jarahueca	19	4–571 – General Carrillo	
Cabaiguán		33	Cabaiguán–Jíquima Road – Saltadero, Cabaiguán	
Taguasco		37	Road to La Larga – La Larga	Southbound on the 4–531
Cabaiguán		38	Road to La Larga – La Larga	Northbound on the 4–531
Cabaiguán	Tres Palmas	40	Road to Las Damas – Las Damas	
Cabaiguán		42	A1 (Autopista Nacional) – Havana, Taguasco	
Taguasco		45	Guayo Road – La Esperanza, Guayos	
Taguasco		48	Road to Tuinicú – Tuinicú, Zaza del Medio	
Sancti Spíritus		53	4-N-1 (Carretera Central) – Sancti Spíritus, Guayos	
