= Majá–Taguasco Road =

Highway in Cuba

- Carretera Majá–Taguasco; Enlace Autopista–Carretera Central (Motorway–Carretera Central Link Road)
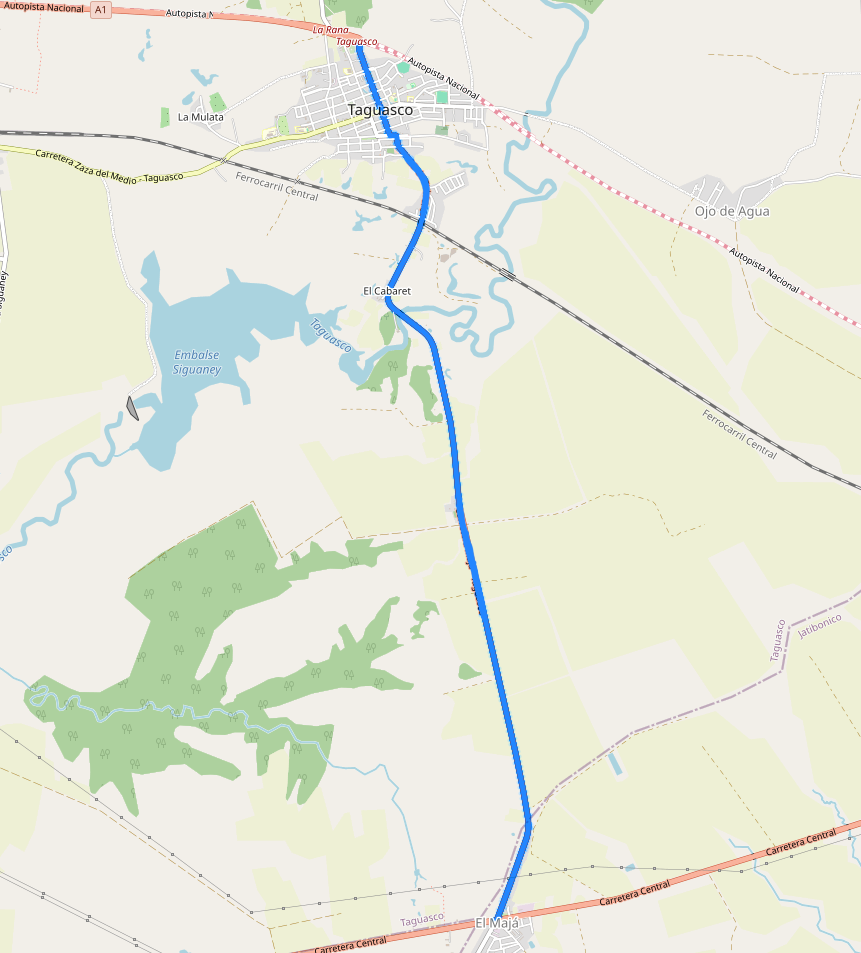
- Majá–Taguasco Road seen in blue, with the A1 motorway seen in orange north of the road, Carretera Central seen in orange south of the road, and the A1 planned section seen in white and red north of the road

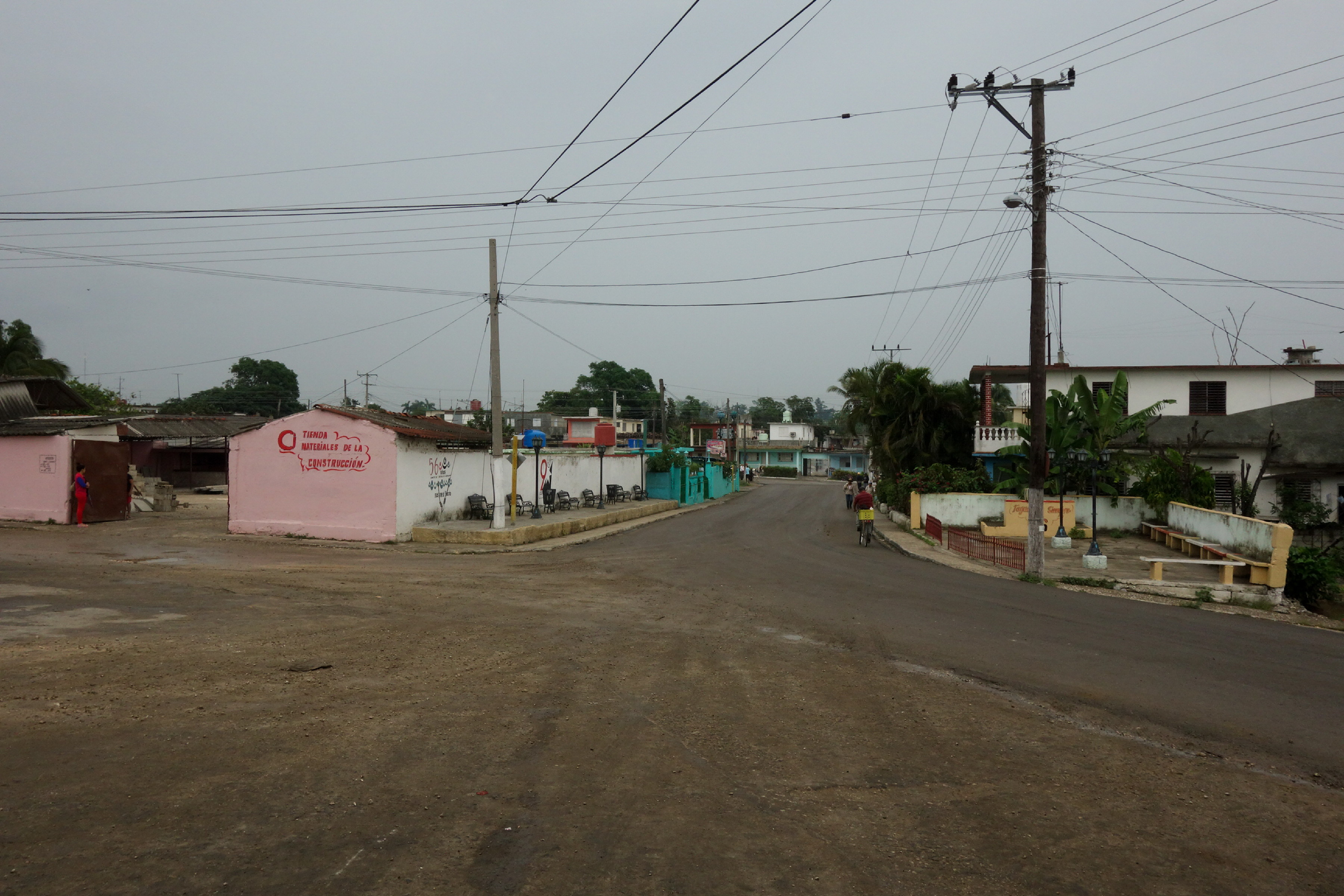
- Calle Abel Santamaría in the town of Taguasco, heading south towards the Carretera Central

Route information
- Length: 8.31 km (5.16 mi)

Major junctions
- North end: A1 in Taguasco
- Zaza del Medio–Taguasco Road in Taguasco
- South end: 4–N–1 in El Maja

Location
- Country: Cuba
- Towns: Taguasco

Highway system
- Roads in Cuba

The Majá–Taguasco Road (Carretera Majá–Taguasco), also known as the Motorway–Carretera Central Connector (Enlace Autopista–Carretera Central) is a north–south highway connecting the town of Taguasco and the end of the Autopista Nacional (A–1) to the town of El Majá and the Carretera Central (N–1, 4–N–1 in this region) in Cuba. The road is part of the main route connecting the west and the east of the country, due to it being at the end of the finished A–1 motorway.

== History ==
Before the A1 motorway was extended to Taguasco in the late 1980s, the road was mostly unused, with reporters saying there being less than five tractors and three horse drawn carriages per day. After the motorway couldn't get extended past Taguasco, the Majá–Taguasco Road became a heavily used road way connecting the far east and far west of the country, with it being the entrance and exit of the Autopista Nacional, the fastest roadway in the country. This caused heavy overuse of the road, with about 2,000 vehicles moving through it each day.

In 2017, the road was closed due to repairs on the overused road for around a month. This caused any east–west traffic to instead take the Sancti Spíritus–Yaguajay Road (4–571) in order to get to the other side of the country. This used 2,530 tons of asphalt, and repaired every pothole in the road.

== Junction list ==
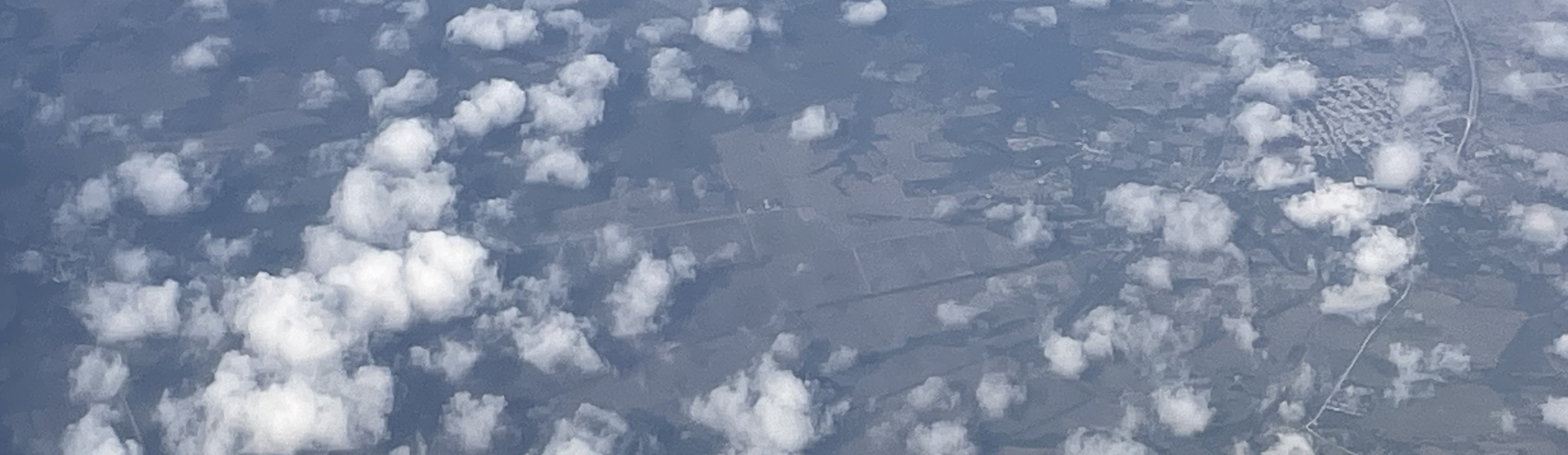
The road seen from above, facing west onto the road

Municipality	Location	km	mi	Destination	Notes
Taguasco	Taguasco	0.00	0.00	A1 (Autopista Nacional) – Havana	Kilometer 336 on the A1
Taguasco	Taguasco	0.63	0.39	Taguasco–Zaza del Media Road (Calle Camilo Cienfuegos)	
Taguasco	Las Margaritas	1.78	1.11	Las Margaritas Bridge	Bridge over the Ferrocarril Central (Central Railway)
Taguasco		2.69	1.67	Taguasco River Bridge	
Jatibonico	El Maja	8.31	5.16	4-N-1 (Carretera Central) / Majá–La Ferrolana Road	Continues as Majá–La Ferrolana Road;Kilometer 407 on the Carretera Central
