= Autopista de Santa Clara =

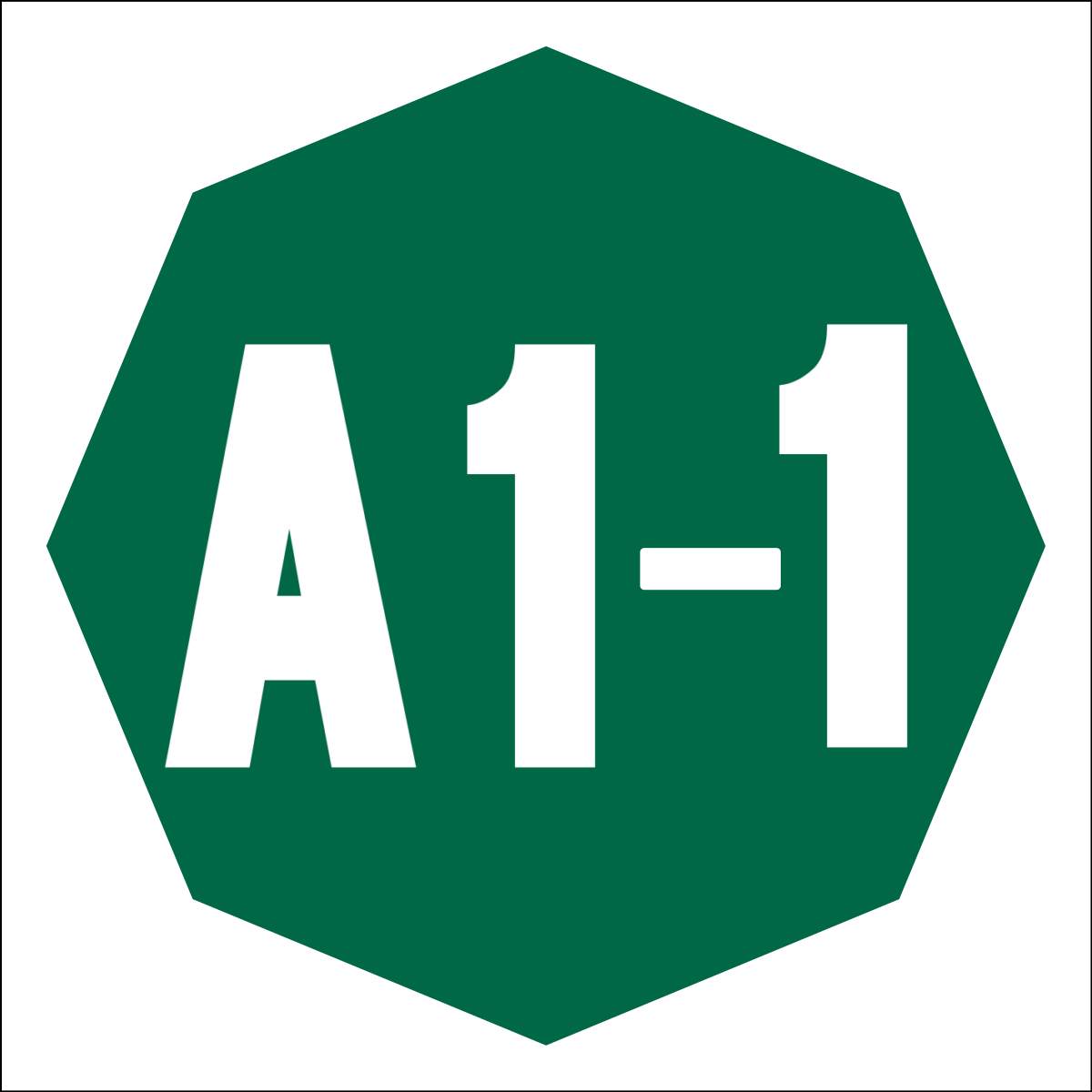
Autopista de Santa Clara
- Santa Clara Motorway
- Autopista A1–1; Desvío de la Autopista a Santa Clara
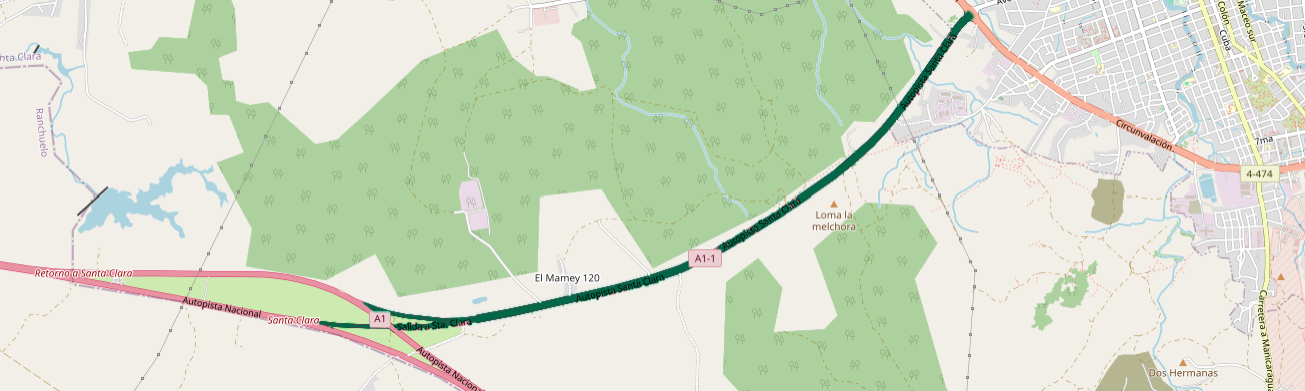
- The A1–1 seen in green

Route information
- Auxiliary route of A1
- Length: 6.48 km (4.03 mi)
- Existed: 1979–present

Major junctions
- West end: A1
- East end: Santa Clara Beltway

Location
- Country: Cuba
- Provinces: Villa Clara
- Municipalities: Santa Clara

Highway system
- Roads in Cuba

The Autopista de Santa Clara (numbered Autopista A1-1) is a motorway detour of the Autopista A1 going to the city of Santa Clara and the Villa Clara Province in central Cuba. The road is 3 lanes on both sides, being a part of the original Autopista A1, going from Havana to Santa Clara.

== History ==
The motorway opened along with the Autopista Nacional, which it was originally a part of, before the A1 got continued until the town of Jatibonico. It was part of construction efforts made after the Cuban Revolution in the city, along with the 26 de Julio Avenue, and the Santa Clara Beltway.

In May 2018, the road was closed due to flooding and heavy rainfall, with drivers having to go around through the highway 4–112, to get to the Carretera Central, and then to the 4–474 on kilometer 270 of the A1. Later in November 2020, the A1 also got closed again, ending at the 4–112, with the A1–1 being included in the closure.

In March 2023, there was a fire on the junction with the Santa Clara Beltway, due to a malfunction of the Gran Panel electrical substation, nearby, in the Gran Panel neighborhood.

In April 2024, the Santa Clara Motorway had an operational closure for in order to "confront crime and illegalities."

== Route ==
Municipality	Ward	km	mi	Destination	Notes
Santa Clara	Circunscripción 93	0	0	A1 (Autopista Nacional) – Havana	
Santa Clara	Circunscripción 93			Comida Criolla Restaurant	Westbound only
Santa Clara	Circunscripción 93	2.07		Unidad 2038	
Santa Clara	Circunscripción 93	2.30		Calle 1ra – El Mamey 120	
Santa Clara	Circunscripción 93	2.98			
Santa Clara	Circunscripción 93	3.22		Road to the Embalse Palmarito	Eastbound only
Santa Clara	Circunscripción 93	4.23			
Santa Clara	Circunscripción 93	4.99			Westbound only
Santa Clara	Condado Sur	5.43		Calle Roble – Los Sirios	
Santa Clara	Condado Sur	5.80		Los Sirios	Eastbound only
Santa Clara	Condado Sur	6.25		Amarillo	Westbound only
Santa Clara	Condado Sur	6.48	4.03	Santa Clara Beltway – Santa Clara	Ends at roundabout, continues as Avenida 9 de Abril 2 lane road
