= Jose Miller =

Cuban activist

Dr. Jose Miller (1925, Yaguajay, Cuba - February 27, 2006, Havana) was the leader of the Jewish community of Cuba for 25 years, from 1981 when the community was tiny and endangered, through the 1990s during which they returned to vigorous growth and reemerged on the world stage. He held the dual positions of head of the Coordinating Commission (the official organization of Cuban Jewry) and head of the Patronato (the country's largest synagogue).

Miller was the interface between the Cuban Jewish community, the government of Fidel Castro, and the world organizations which wished to provide assistance to Cuban Jewry. His skills in diplomacy and arbitration allowed him to meld the often conflicting demands of these disparate groups into a compromise which was acceptable to all.

In 1924 Miller's parents immigrated from Poland to Cuba, where his father became a peddler and eventually a merchant. Although his family maintained a traditional Jewish home, in the small town of Yaguajay there were few other Jews, and Miller grew up having close relationships with non-Jewish Cubans, giving him the wide understanding which was to serve him in his career.

In the 1950s Miller was active in the Maimonides Lodge (Havana) of B'nai B'rith.
