= La Sierpe, Cuba =

La Sierpe
- Municipality
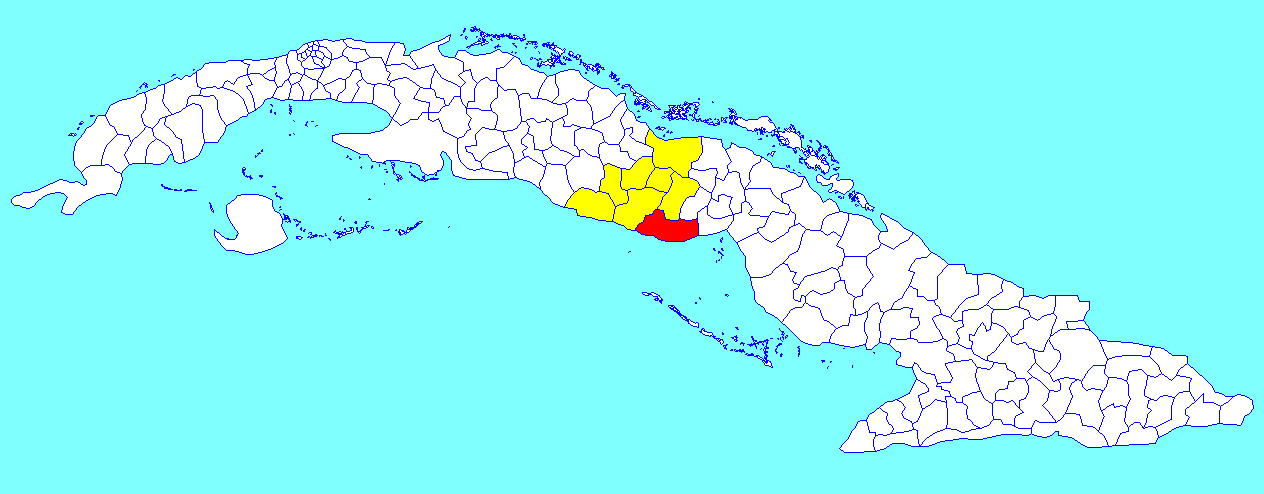
- La Sierpe municipality (red) within Sancti Spíritus Province (yellow) and Cuba
- Coordinates: 21°45′38″N 79°14′36″W
- Country: Cuba
- Province: Sancti Spíritus

Government
  - President: Yilián Díaz Meneses

Area
  - Total: 1,035 km^{2} (400 sq mi)
- Elevation: 35 m (115 ft)

Population (2022)
  - Total: 16,573
  - Density: 16.01/km^{2} (41.47/sq mi)
- Time zone: UTC-5 (EST)
- Area code: +53-41
- Website: https://lasierpe.gob.cu/

La Sierpe is a municipality and town in the Sancti Spíritus Province of Cuba. It is located in the south-eastern part of the province, 30 kilometres (19 mi) from Sancti Spiritus, the provincial capital.

== Geography ==
It borders the Gulf of Ana Maria of the Caribbean Sea to the south and the province of Ciego de Ávila to the east.

It is also located near the geographic center of the country.

== Demographics ==
In 2022, the municipality of La Sierpe had a population of 16,937. With a total area of 1,035 km^{2} (400 sq mi), it has a population density of 16/km^{2} (41/sq mi).

== See also ==
- Municipalities of Cuba
- List of cities in Cuba
