= Torriente =

Torriente is a surname. Notable people with the surname include:

- Celso Golmayo Torriente (1879–1924), Cuban–Spanish chess master
- Cosme de la Torriente y Peraza (1872–1956), Cuban soldier, politician, lawyer and statesman
- Cristóbal Torriente (1893–1938), Cuban baseball player
- Dario de Urra Torriente (born 1939), Cuban diplomat
- Idel Torriente (born 1986), Cuban amateur boxer
- Manuel Golmayo Torriente (1883–1973), Cuban-Spanish chess master
- Pablo de la Torriente Brau (1901–1936), Cuban writer, journalist and soldier
