= Bay of Buena Vista =

Geographic landform of Cuba

Coordinates: 22°27′N 79°10′W

Designations

Ramsar Wetland
- Official name: Buenavista
- Designated: 18 November 2002
- Reference no.: 1233

Location of Bay of Buena Vista in Cuba

The Bay of Buena Vista (Spanish: Bahía de Buena Vista) is a bay on Cuba's northern Atlantic shore. It is located in the northern part of the provinces of Sancti Spíritus, Villa Clara and Ciego de Ávila, between mainland Cuba and the archipelago that lines its northern coast.

== Overview ==
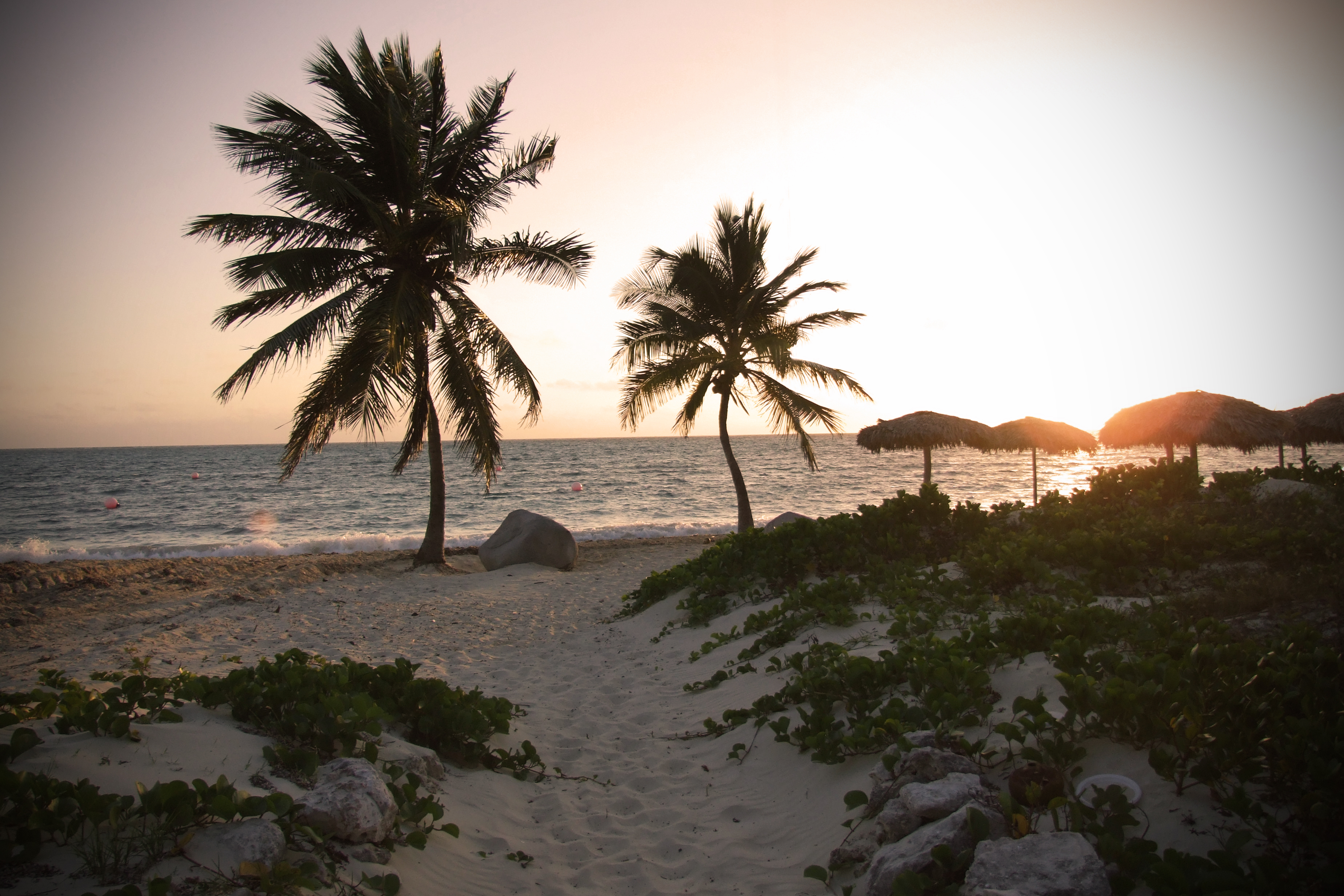
Sunset in Jardines del Rey.

The bay is about 300 km east of Havana.

The many cays that define the bay's northern limits include (west to east) Cayo Fragoso, Cayo Francés and Cayo Santa María of the Sabana-Camaguey Archipelago. Past them, the bay opens to the north-west in the Nicholas Channel and to the north-east in the Old Bahama Channel.

On the east side, the bay leaves the Sancti Spiritu Province to go to Ciego de Ávila Province: it opens into the Perros Bay (Bahia Perros, Bay of Dogs) as it reaches cayo Coco.

The southern edge lies in the municipalities of Caibarién, Yaguajay, Chambas and Morón as well as the Bay of Dogs (Bahia Perros). To the east it is bordered by Cayo Coco and Cayo Guillermo of the Jardines del Rey archipelago and the Bay of Jiguey.

== Conservation ==
Caguanes National Park is established on the southern shore. The bay itself is a Biosphere reserve and a Ramsar Convention site. The strictly protected area extends for 313.5 km^{2} (121.0 sq mi) into the bay. Other ecological reserves are established on Cayo Francés, Cayo Santa María, Cayo Guillermo and Cayo Coco, while a fauna reserve is set up on Cayo Las Loras. Buffer zones are established in the form of further protected areas in Jobo Rosado and Boquerones on the mainland.

The cays contain more than 20 endemic species.
