= Cabaiguán =

- Municipality
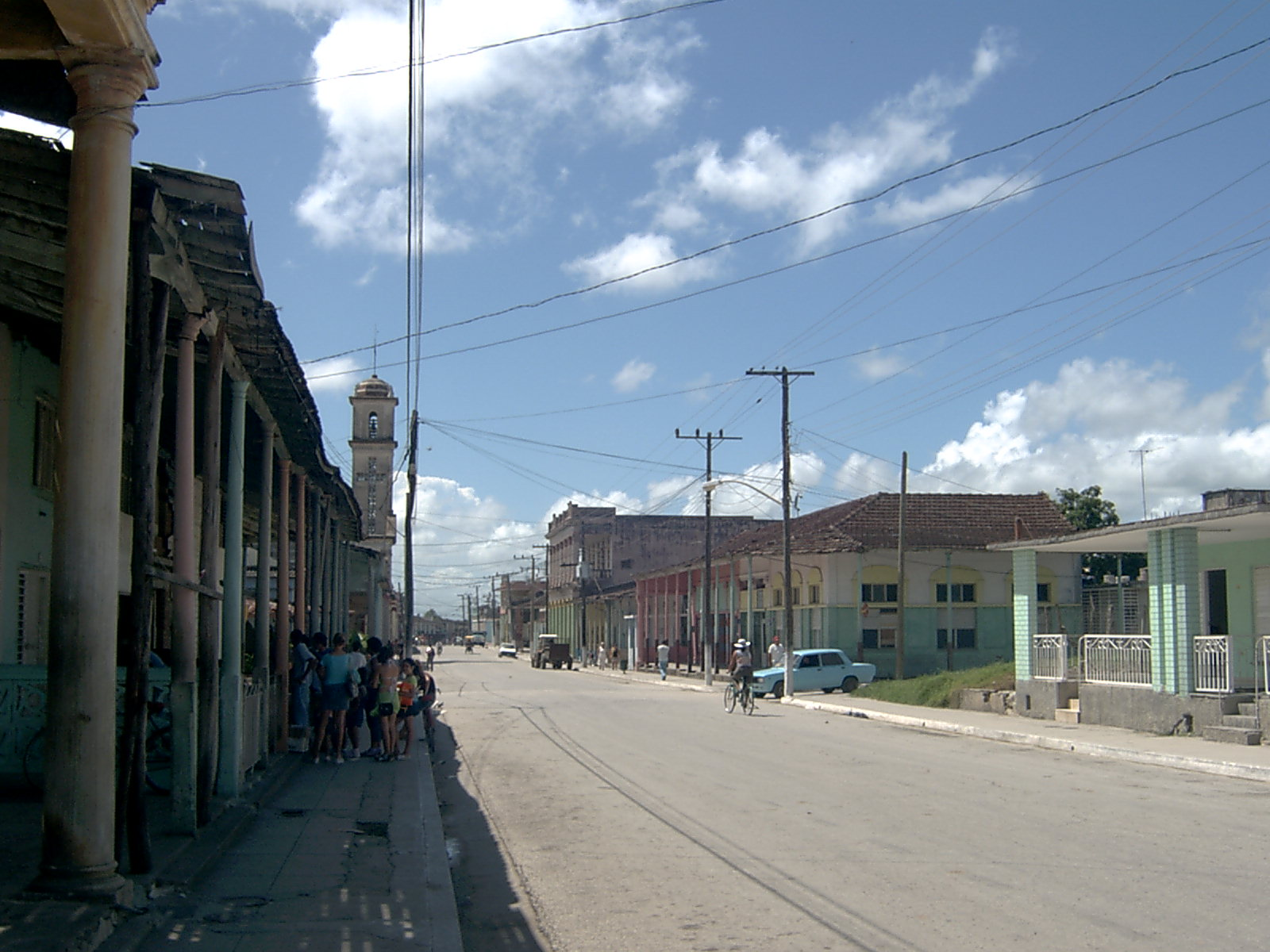
- A road in town's centre

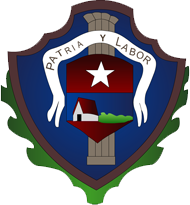
- Coat of arms
- Nickname: Pueblo de los Berracos
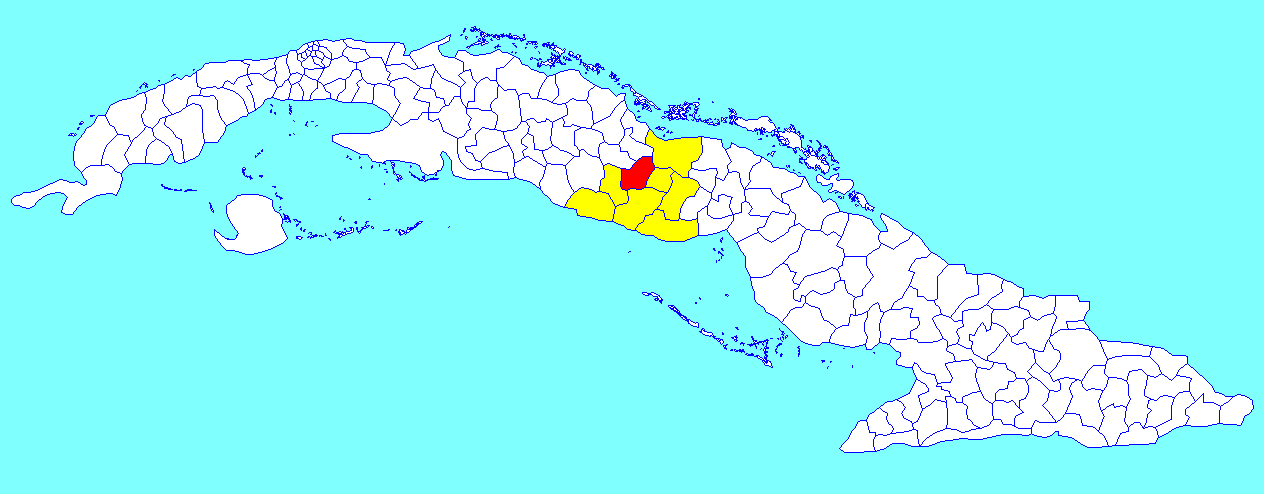
- Cabaiguán municipality (red) within Sancti Spíritus Province (yellow) and Cuba
- Coordinates: 22°05′2″N 79°29′43″W
- Country: Cuba
- Province: Sancti Spíritus
- Founded: 1894
- Established: 1926 (Municipality)

Area
  - Total: 597 km^{2} (231 sq mi)
- Elevation: 135 m (443 ft)

Population (2022)
  - Total: 63,981
  - Density: 107/km^{2} (278/sq mi)
- Time zone: UTC-5 (EST)
- Area code: +53-41
- Website: https://cabaiguan.gob.cu/

Cabaiguán (Spanish pronunciation: [kaβajˈɣwan]) is a municipality and town in the province of Sancti Spíritus, Cuba. With an urban population of 42,075 is the 3rd largest town of the province. It is bordered to the north by the municipality of Yaguajay, to the east with the municipality of Taguasco, to the south with the municipality of Sancti Spíritus with the Tuinicú River serving as its limit, to the southwest with Fomento and to the west and northwest with Placetas, a municipality within the province of Villa Clara. It has a territorial area of 598.98 km^{2}.

== Overview ==
It was founded in 1894, and established as a municipality in 1926. The municipality is divided into the consejos populares (i.e. "popular councils") of Cabaiguán and the villages of Neiva, Pedro Barba, Guayos and Santa Lucía.

== Demographics ==
In 2022, the municipality of Cabaiguán had a population of 63,981. With a total area of 597 km^{2} (231 sq mi), it has a population density of 110/km^{2} (280/sq mi). Cabaiguan was known as the Cuban epicenter of migration from the Canary Islands.

== Economy ==
Cabaiguán is best known for its cigars; and there is a small cigar factory where various brands of international renown are produced. It also has an oil refinery built in 1947 and the Nieves Morejon quarry, where the Provincial Prison is located.

== Transport ==
The town straddles the Carretera Central highway and is served by the A1 motorway. It has a railway station on the central Havana-Santiago line.

== See also ==
- Municipalities of Cuba
- List of cities in Cuba
