= Caguanes National Park =

National park in Cuba

- IUCN category II (national park)
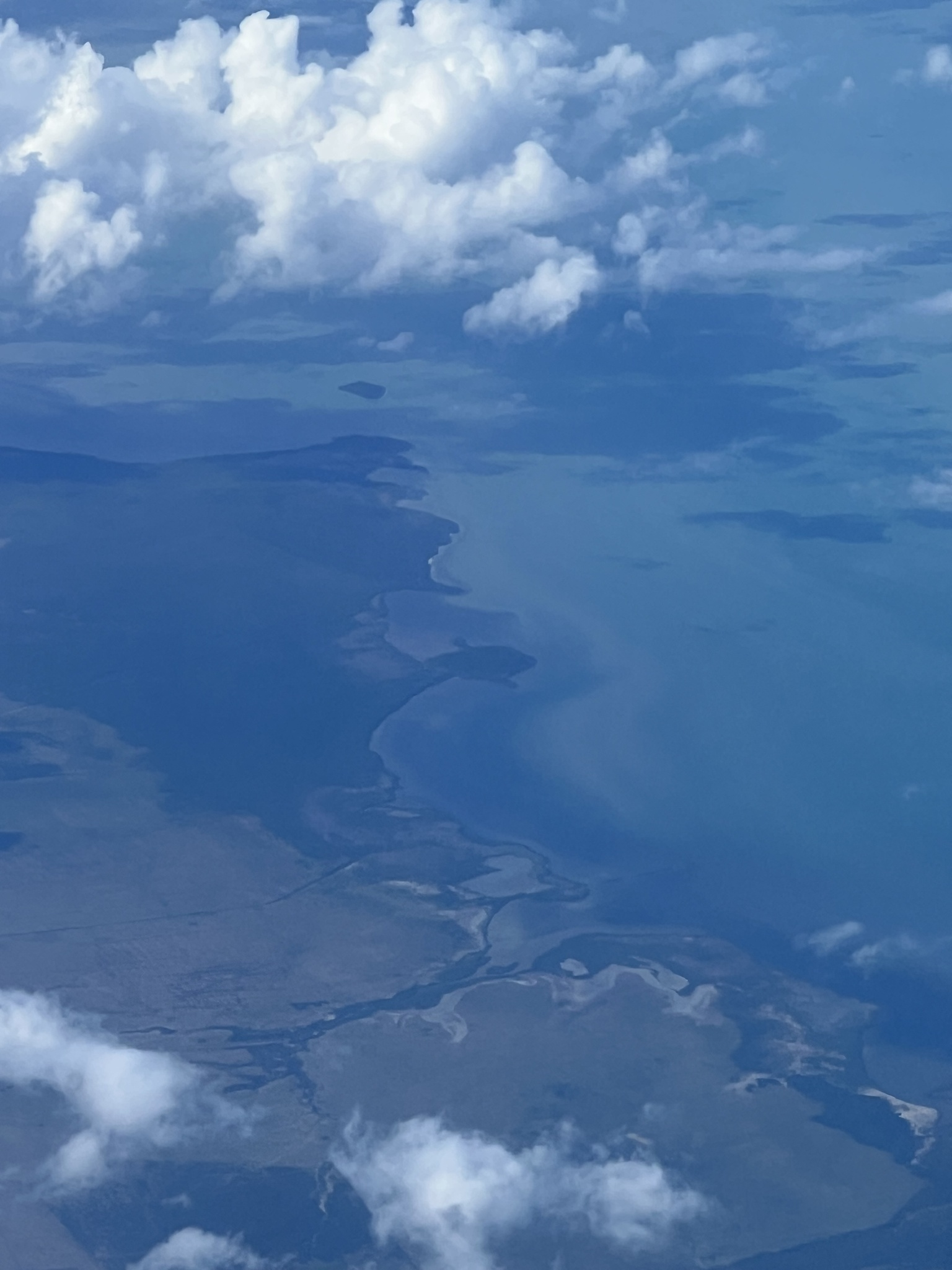

- Location within Cuba
- Location: Cuba
- Nearest city: Yaguajay
- Coordinates: 22°22′47″N 79°07′45″W
- Area: 204.87 km^{2} (79.10 sq mi)
- Established: 18 December 2001

Caguanes National Park (Spanish: Parque Nacional Caguanes) is a national park located in Yaguajay municipality in Sancti Spíritus Province on the northern (Atlantic) coast of Cuba. It supports a wide variety of plant and animal species and has a number of important archaeological sites. It is part of the Buenavista Biosphere Reserve.

== Geography ==
It is centered around the Caguanes peninsula and includes "the coastal plain Corralillo-Yaguajay and a marine-coastal area in the Bay of Buena Vista", several small cays called the Cayos de Piedra (Stone Keys) in the bay (a Ramsar Convention site), and the Guayaberas swamps and mangroves. The park covers an area of 204.87 square kilometres (79.10 sq mi).

There are numerous caves within the park, around 79 according to two sources, which provide a habitat for bats and other cave dwellers. Some contain pictographs and other signs of prehistoric residents (see Archaeology section below).

Coral reefs and four types of underwater geological formations called "hillocks" provide shelter for marine fauna.

== Flora and fauna ==
The ecosystem supports 460 animal species, 271 invertebrate and 189 vertebrate, including the Cuban hutia, Cuban rock iguana, bats, sea turtles, and resident and migratory birds; one of the former is Cuba's national bird, the Cuban trogon.

There are also 368 species of terrestrial plants, including mangroves, as well as semi-deciduous forests.

== Archeology ==
Archaeological studies have been conducted since the 1940s. In 1941, two funeral caves were found. Pictographs have been found in the Punta de Caguanas and petroglyphs and other artifacts in numerous other caves. In 1986, a fossil of the Cuban giant owl was found. There are 38 archeological sites in all.

== Tourism ==
Around 7000 tourists visit per year, providing employment for approximately 25,000 residents.
