= Dario de Urra Torriente =

Chargé d'affaires of Cuba to People's Republic of the Congo
- In office 1965–1967
- Preceded by: Jorge Serguera Riveri

Ambassador of Cuba to People's Republic of the Congo
- In office July 3, 1981 – 1986
- Succeeded by: 27 de septiembre de 2007: Luis Castillo Campos

Ambassador of Cuba to Seychelles
- In office 1987–1987

Cuban ambassador to Jamaica of Cuba to Jamaica
- In office 1990–1994
- Succeeded by: Olga Miranda Bravo

Ambassador of Cuba to Guinea
- In office 1995–1996

Ambassador of Cuba to Iran
- In office 1996–2001
- Succeeded by: September 15, 2009: William Carbó Ricardo

Ambassador of Cuba to Lebanon
- In office 2004–2004
- Succeeded by: 6 de noviembre de 2009: Manuel María Serrano Acosta

Personal details
- Born: July 19, 1939 (age 86) Cienfuegos
- Spouse: Married
- Children: two children
- Education: . Educ: Licence in Law - Juridical Sciences from the Havana Faculty - Cuba.

Dario de Urra Torriente (born July 19, 1939) is a retired Cuban ambassador.

== Career ==
- From 1963 to 1964 he was Third Secretary and Attache Commercial in Algeria.
- From 1965 to 1967 he was 1st Secretary then Chargé d'affaires in Brazzaville (People's Republic of the Congo).
- From 1968 to 1970 he was Director of Africa and Middle East Department at the Ministry of Foreign Affairs (Cuba).
- From 1971 to 1973 he was Vice-Consul in Kingston (Jamaica).
- From 1973 to 1977 he was Adviser at the Embassy in Conakry (Guinea).
- From 1978 to 1981 he was Head of Middle East and North Africa Department at the Ministry of Foreign Affairs (Cuba).
- From July 3, 1981 to 1986 he was Ambassador in Brazzaville (People's Republic of the Congo).
- From 1986 to 1989 he was Vice-president of the Directorate "Afrique Noire".
- In 1987 he was Ambassador in Victoria, Seychelles Seychelles Republic.
- From 1990 to 1994 he was Ambassador in Kingston (Jamaica).
- From 1994 to 1997 he was Vice-president of the Directorate "Afrique Noire".
- In 1995 he was Ambassador in Guinea.
- From 1996 to 2001 he was Ambassador in Tehran (Iran).
- In 2001 he was Responsible of Middle East and North Africa Departmrnt.
- From April 20, 2004 to 2005 he was Ambassador in Beirut (Lebanon).
