= Guayos =

- Town
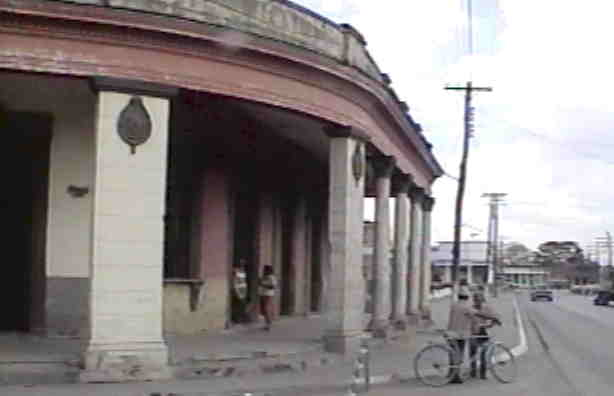
- View of the town. To the left, a former warehouse now converted to a special school

- Location of Guayos in Cuba
- Coordinates: 22°02′59″N 79°27′44″W
- Country: Cuba
- Province: Sancti Spíritus
- Municipality: Cabaiguán
- Named for: Plant with the same name
- Elevation: 96 m (315 ft)

Population
  - Total: 15,000
- Demonym: Guayense
- Time zone: UTC-5 (EST)
- Area code: +53-41-65xxxx

Guayos is a small town and consejo popular (i.e. "people's council") located in the municipality of Cabaiguán, province of Sancti Spíritus, Cuba.

== History ==
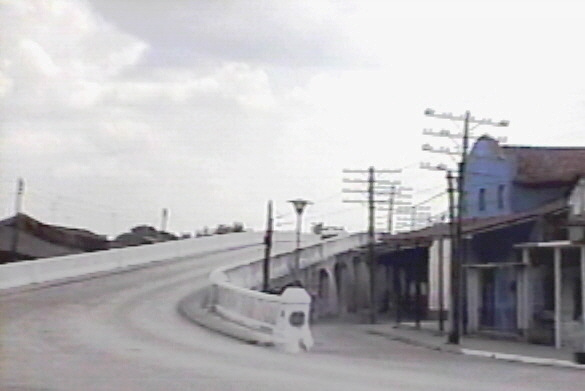
Los Elevados bridge.

The name of Guayos was given to the town by travelers that were inspired by trees of the same name which surrounded the town. These trees would serve travelers as a place of rest and relaxation. The town was founded by Captain Miguel Reyes, who fought with the Independence General Antonio Maceo. His daughter Mercedes Reyes was one of the first female to serve as a Major in Cuba.

The Central Road (Carretera Central) and the Railway of Cuba (Ferrocarriles de Cuba) run along the whole island and connect Guayos with all the other provinces and their capitals, including the capital of the country, as well as with other small towns on the island. The bridge Los Elevados (literally The High) was constructed at the same time as the Central Road under Gerardo Machado's plans to connect the whole country. Los Elevados, keeps both, the Central Road and the railway running without interruptions and has become a symbol of the town and of national character.

== Geography ==
The town is located in the central region of Cuba, only 13.6 miles (22 km) away from the exact geographic center of the island. Guayos' coordinates are 22° 2' 59" north, 79° 27' 44" west, the town is only 231 m (373 km) away from Havana, the capital of Cuba and only 8 miles (13 km) away from its provincial capital, Sancti Spíritus. Guayos has an altitude of 96 amsl. The people that live in Guayos are called guayenses.

== Demographics ==
The population in Guayos has been growing since the early 20th century. Today the population surpasses 15,000 inhabitants and is mainly composed by descendants of the Spanish Canary Islands.

Census	1953	1943	1931	1919
Population	5,509	3,617	3,467	2,059

== Education ==
As stated in the Cuban Constitution, there are no private schools in the town. School attendance is compulsory until end of basic secondary education (normally at 15) and uniforms are always required. Four primary schools and one basic secondary school cover the educational needs of Guayos. All schools have free lunch for the school staff, including students and teachers. The town has a public library in addition to each school having their own. Guayos also has a house museum, a house of culture, in-charged of managing cultural events in the town and a center for film projections and stage shows.

== Healthcare ==
Guayos has a renovated cottage hospital and a pharmacy. The demolition of the old cottage hospital started on February 28, 2003, by the hospital's staff and volunteers. The Empresa Constructora de Obras de Arquitectura (ECOA 51) started the rebuilding, this process required the hospital to be moved into mobile facilities for several months. Manuel Wong, president of the hospital, assures that in this time, besides doctor, he became designer, bricklayer, plumber, leader of work and investor. The new building takes up a whole manzana (1.68 acres) and 2,372 square meters (2836 square yards) of length. The hospital offers new services and features such as ultrasound, observation rooms, X-Rays, microbiology, duodenal biliary drainages and a gym for physical therapy and rehabilitation.

The pharmacy, located in front of the hospital, sells medication with and without prescription at very affordable prices; ranging from CUP$0.50 to CUP$20.

== Economy ==
Guayos' economy is based mainly on agriculture. Sugarcane and tobacco are cultivated extensively on the outskirts of the town. In the southwestern region of Guayos, the now destroyed sugar mill Remberto Abad Alemán, before 1959 was called "Las Vegas" lies next to the Donque river. Cattle also contribute to the economy of the town. The most famous cigar factory before 1959 was "Tabacos León, and the owner was Erasmo León, uncle of the Cuban famous chef Erasmo Hernández León. The brothers of Erasmo León were also owners of another famous cigar factory, "Galileo" in the town of Cabaiguán. The cigar factory was intervened by the government and after that was close. In 1998 another Cigar Factory was opened in town, creating hundreds of jobs.

== Natural resources ==
On the outskirts of Guayos is found the Nieves Morejón quarry, from which limestone is extracted for the production of white cement in the nearby factory of Siguaney. Next to it, a national maximum security prison is located. In May 2008, the facility faced complaints from prisoners that were not receiving letters. The post office of Guayos said that they were not delivering letters "because they do not have personnel to deliver the correspondence to the prison".

== Cultural heritage - Parrandas ==
The greatest expression of traditional culture in Guayos is embodied in a festival called the Parrandas.

Celebrated for first time in 1925, the Guayos Parrandas or Changüíes overflows with the passions of its inhabitants in an encounter that every year, in a friendly and festive way, faces the two opposite districts, La Loma and Cantarranas. This festivity was brought from the city of Remedios by residents of that villa that arrived at Guayos to work in tobacco fertile valleys. With the particularity to last only 24 hours, from one sunrise to the next, the Guayos Parrandas is characterized by majestic and artistic floats, gigantic light artworks, the pyrotechnics as well as the excessive fireworks of all kinds, as well as popular rhythmical street congas.

This celebration, with more than half century of tradition, usually begins with the changüíses from each of the districts, alternating themselves during several weekends until the final Parranda day comes, when at sunrise the guayenses are waked up by the sound of the church bells and the roar of the fireworks. The Guayos Parrandas had become in a rich cultural activity of the town stimulated by the rivalry between the districts of La Loma, whose symbols are the goat and red, and Cantarranas, whose symbols are the frog and green.

With the new political-administrative division in Cuba, Guayos went to be a part of municipality of Cabaiguan, whose Government had tried end this tradition. The changüíes have been disappearing and the Parrandas had fallen in a decay state. Nevertheless, the big effort and immense desire of the guayenses to maintain its tradition alive, this festivity is now celebrated only in an inconsistent way and without a fixed date for its celebration. The date is only determined by the Government of the Municipality of Cabaiguán on a whim. While this is a popular tradition everything around it is totally controlled by the Government.

=== Floats seen during the Guayos Parrandas celebration ===
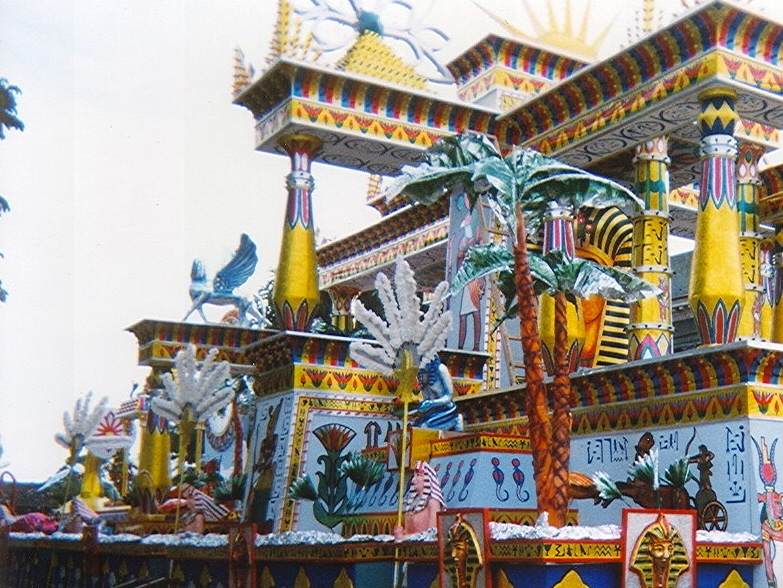
Dawn over the Nile river

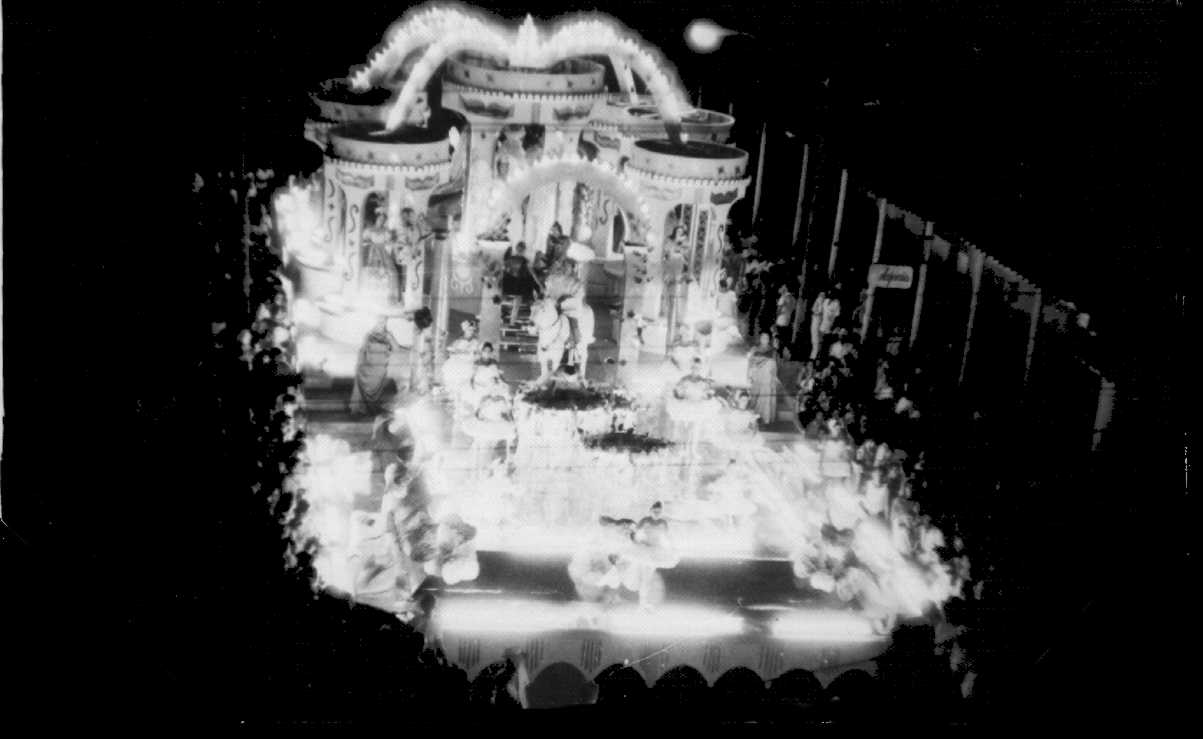
The Swan Lake

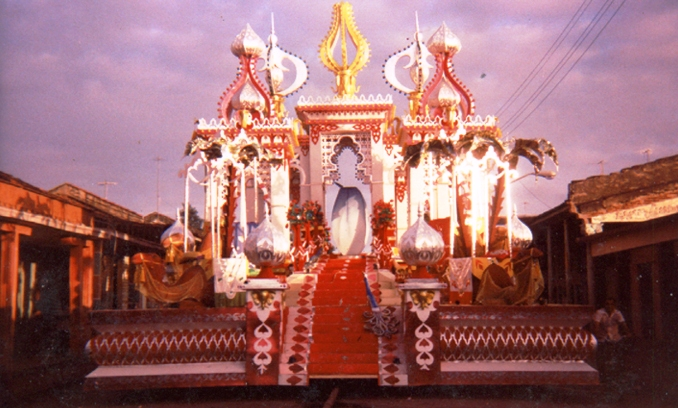
The Iran gardens

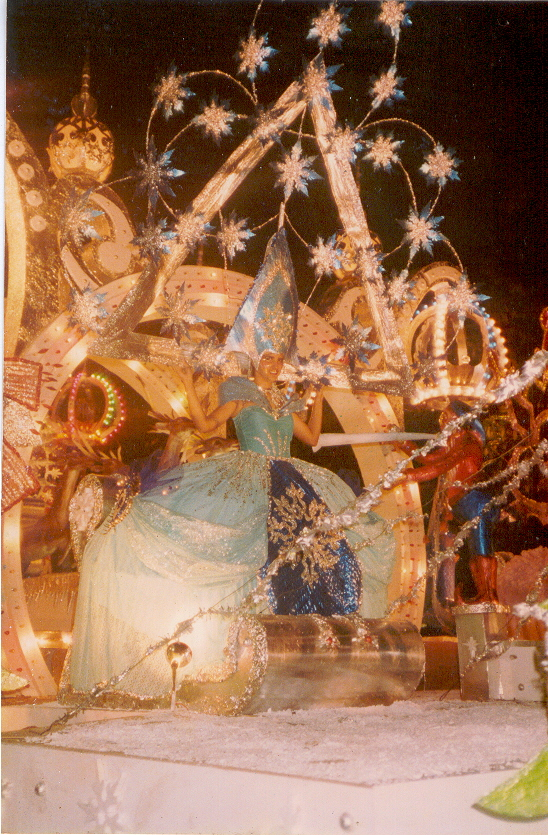
Winter night dreams
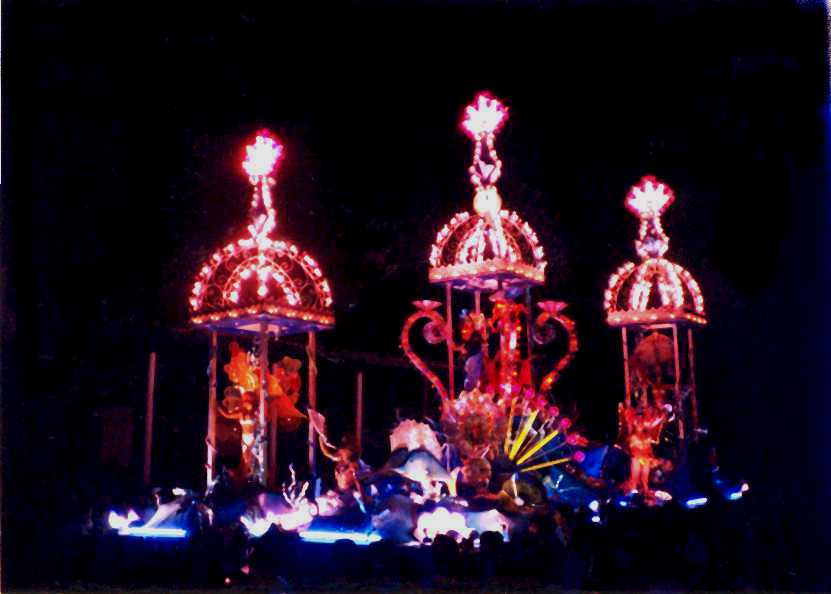
Pearl hunters

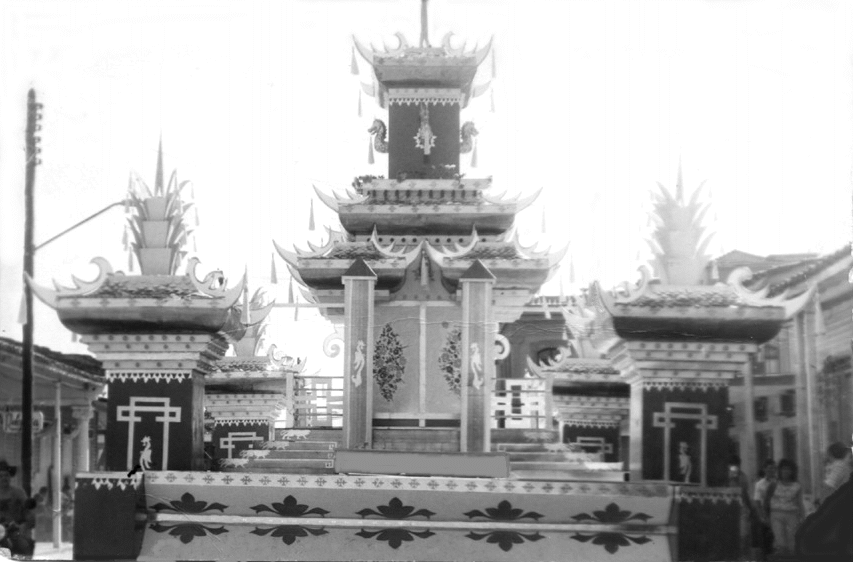
Kambaluc

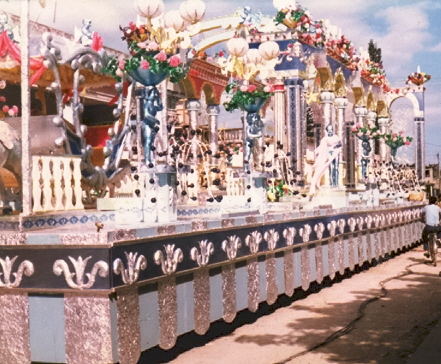
Empress of Austria

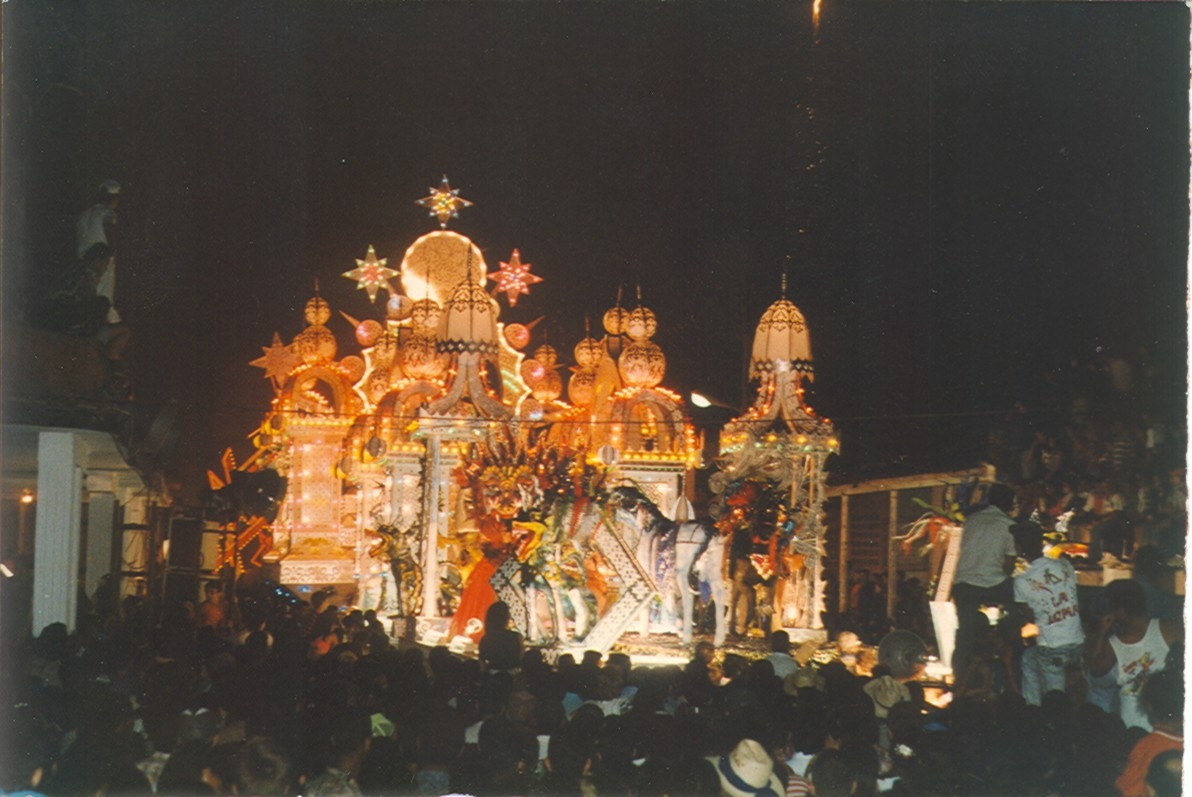
The son of the wind

== See also ==
- List of places in Cuba
