= Yaguajay, Cuba =

Municipality in Sancti Spíritus, Cuba

Yaguajay
- Municipality
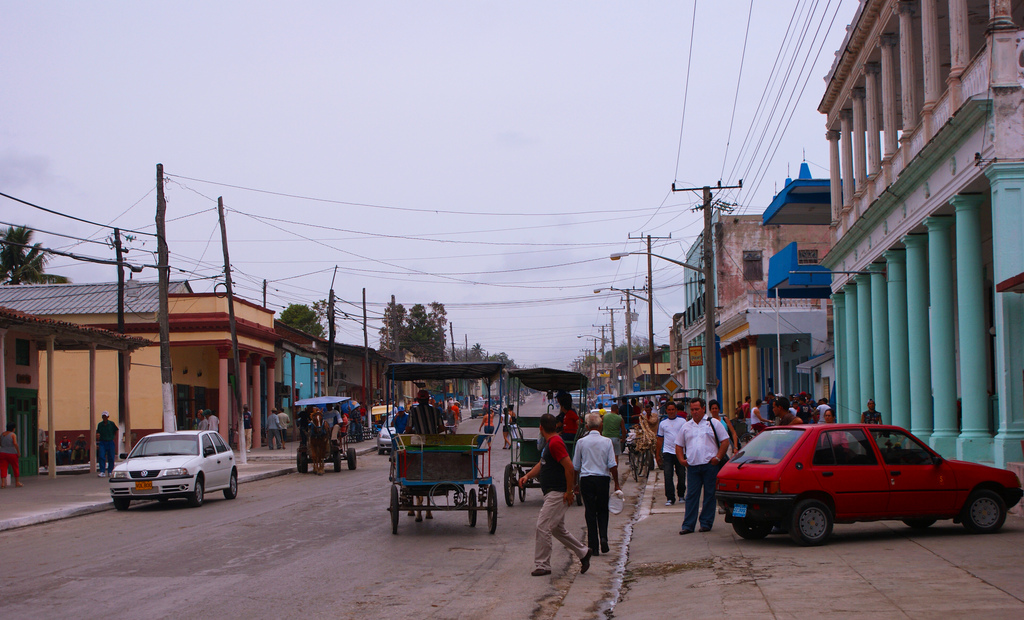
- Central road of Yaguajay

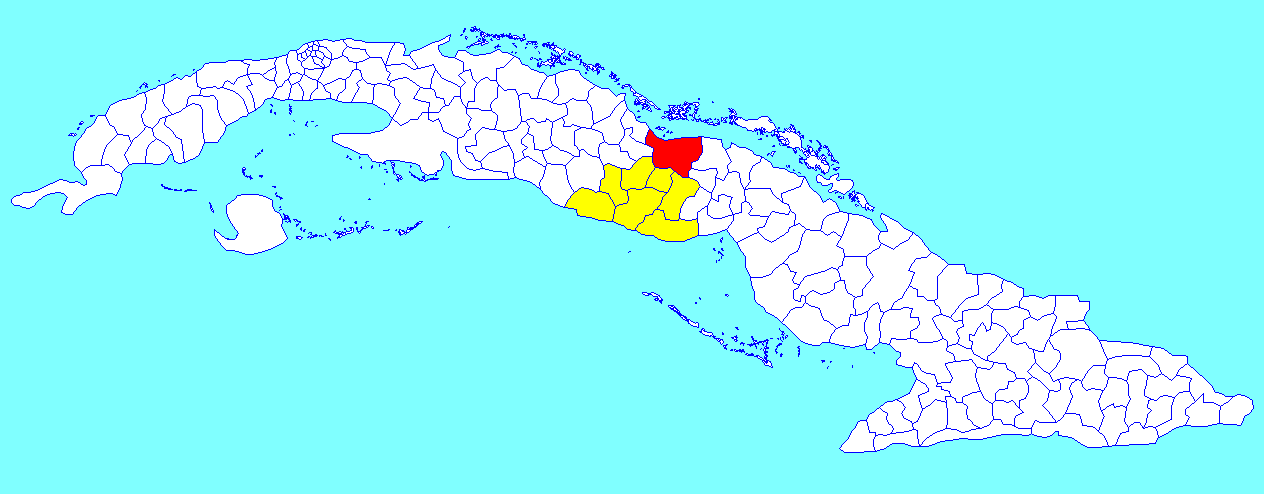
- Yaguajay municipality (red) within Sancti Spíritus Province (yellow) and Cuba
- Coordinates: 22°19′49″N 79°14′13″W
- Country: Cuba
- Province: Sancti Spíritus
- Founded: 1847
- Established: 1879 (Municipality)

Area
  - Total: 1,032 km^{2} (398 sq mi)
- Elevation: 30 m (98 ft)

Population (2022)
  - Total: 53,375
  - Density: 51.72/km^{2} (134.0/sq mi)
- Time zone: UTC-5 (EST)
- Area code: +53-41
- Website: https://yaguajay.gob.cu/

Yaguajay (Spanish pronunciation: [ɟʝaɣwaˈxaj]) is a municipality and town in the Sancti Spíritus Province of Cuba. It is located in the northern part of the province, and borders the Bay of Buena Vista to the north. The Caguanes National Park (protecting swamp and coastal ecosystems, caves and mural art) is located in Yaguajay.

== Geography ==
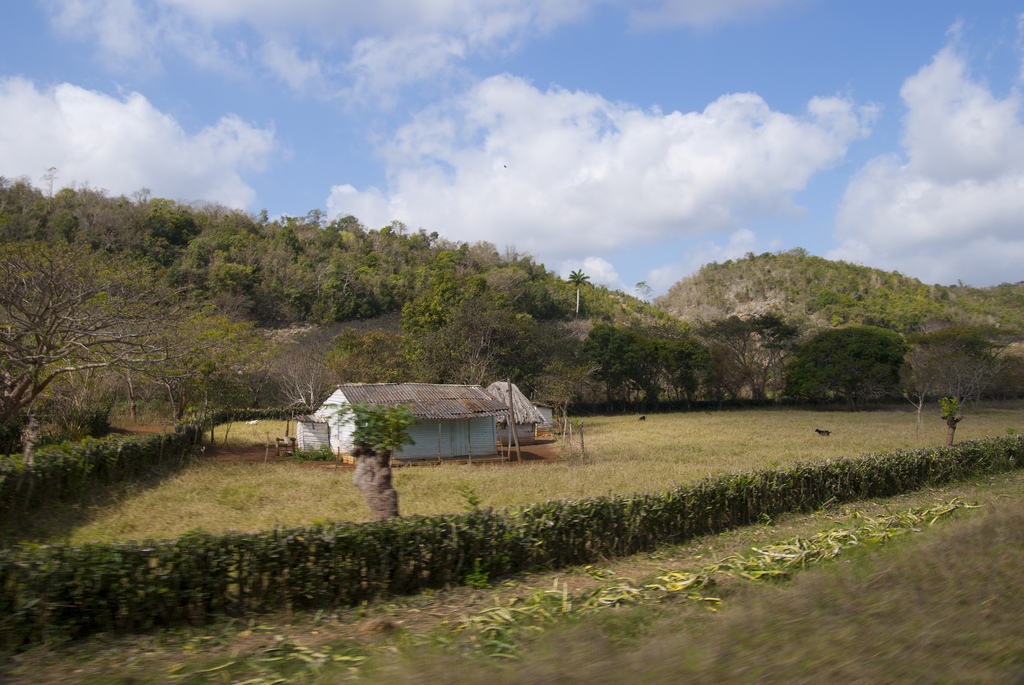
Mogote formations of the Sierra Bamburanao in Yaguajay

The municipality was divided into the barrios of Bamburanao, Cabecera, Centeno, Mayajigua, Meneses and Seibabo. It is currently divided into the consejos populares (popular councils, i.e. hamlets) of CAI Aracelio Iglesias, El Río, Iguará, Itabo, Jarahueca, La Loma, Mayajigua, Meneses, CAI Obdulio Morales, Perea, Sansaricq, Seibabo, CAI Simón Bolivar, Turquino I, Turquino II and Venegas.

== History ==
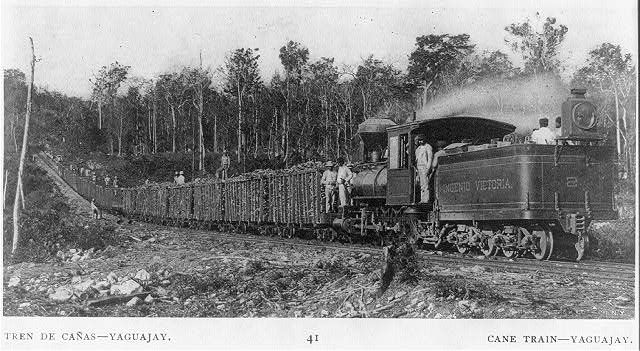
Sugar cane train in Yaguajay, 1901

It was founded in 1847 and established as a municipality in 1879, then part of the province of Las Villas.

=== The Battle of Yaguajay ===
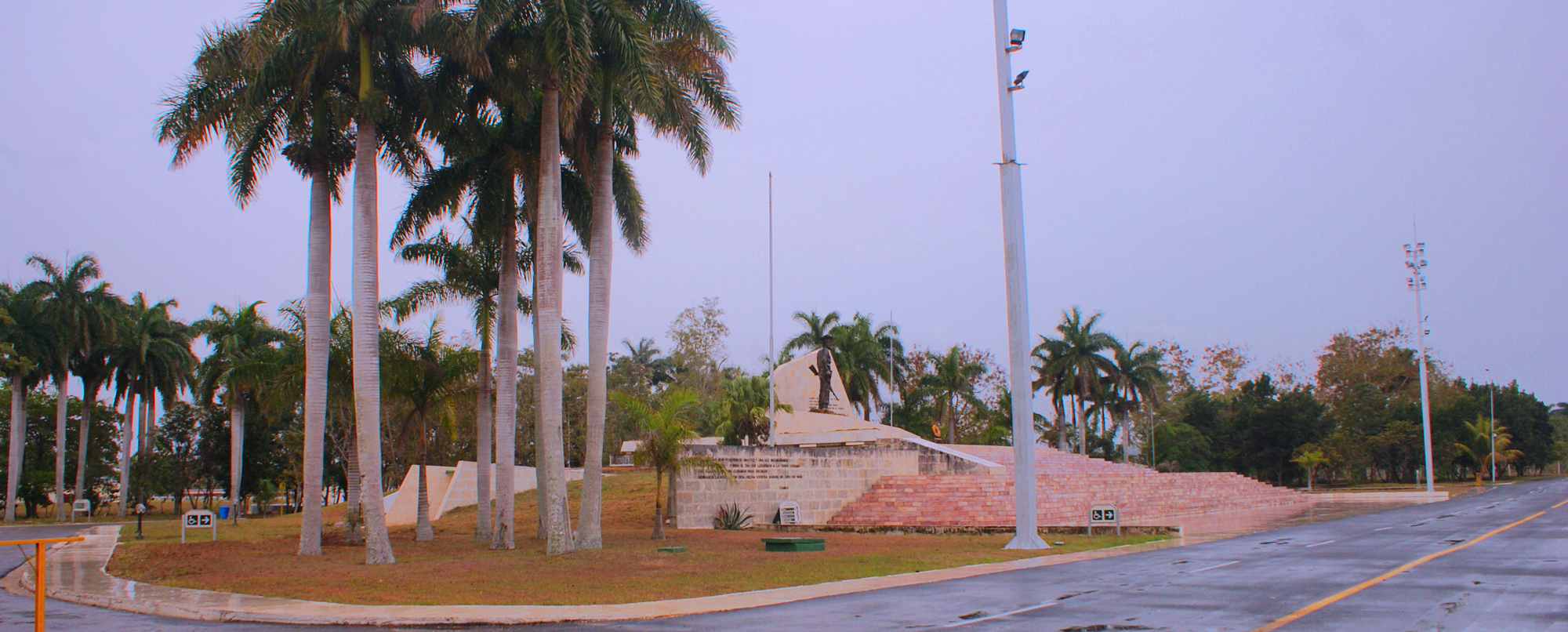
Central part of the battle's monument and plaza with the statue of Camilo Cienfuegos

Camilo Cienfuegos fought an important battle in this city one of the last battles of the Cuban Revolution in 1958 defeating a Cuban Army Captain Alfredo Abon Lee, known as El heroe de Yaguajay (Spanish: the hero of Yaguajay). In 1958, Fidel Castro ordered his revolutionary army to go on the offensive against the army of Fulgencio Batista. While Fidel led one force against Guisa, Masó and other towns, the other major offensive was directed at the capture of the city of Santa Clara, the capital of what was then Las Villas Province.

Three columns were sent against Santa Clara under the command of Che Guevara, Jaime Vega, and Camilo Cienfuegos. Vega's column was caught in an ambush and completely destroyed. Guevara's column took up positions around Santa Clara (near Fomento). Cienfuegos's column directly attacked a local army garrison at Yaguajay. Initially Cienfuegos's column was just 60 men, out of Castro's hardened core of 230. But as they moved through the lands towards Santa Clara, they gained many recruits. A best guess is that Cienfuegos had between 450 and 500 men fighting for him.

The garrison was some 250 men under the command of a Cuban-born Chinese captain Abon Lee. The attack seems to have started around December 19. Convinced that reinforcements would be sent from Santa Clara, Lee put up a determined defense of his post. Repeatedly, the guerrillas attempted to overpower Lee and his men, but each time they failed. By December 26, Cienfuegos had become quite frustrated; it seemed that Lee could not be overpowered, nor could he be convinced to surrender. In desperation, Cienfuegos used a homemade "tank" against Lee's position. The "tank" was actually a large tractor encased in iron plates with attached makeshift flamethrowers on top. It, too, proved unsuccessful. Finally, on December 30, Lee, out of ammunition, surrendered his garrison under the realization they could not continue fighting without water, food, or munitions.

=== Aftermath of the battle ===
The surrender of the garrison was a major blow to the defenders of the provincial capital of Santa Clara. The next day, the combined forces of Cienfuegos, Guevara, and local revolutionaries under William Alexander Morgan captured Santa Clara in a fight of vast confusion. News of the loss of Santa Clara and other losses elsewhere panicked Batista and he fled Cuba the next day.

== Demographics ==
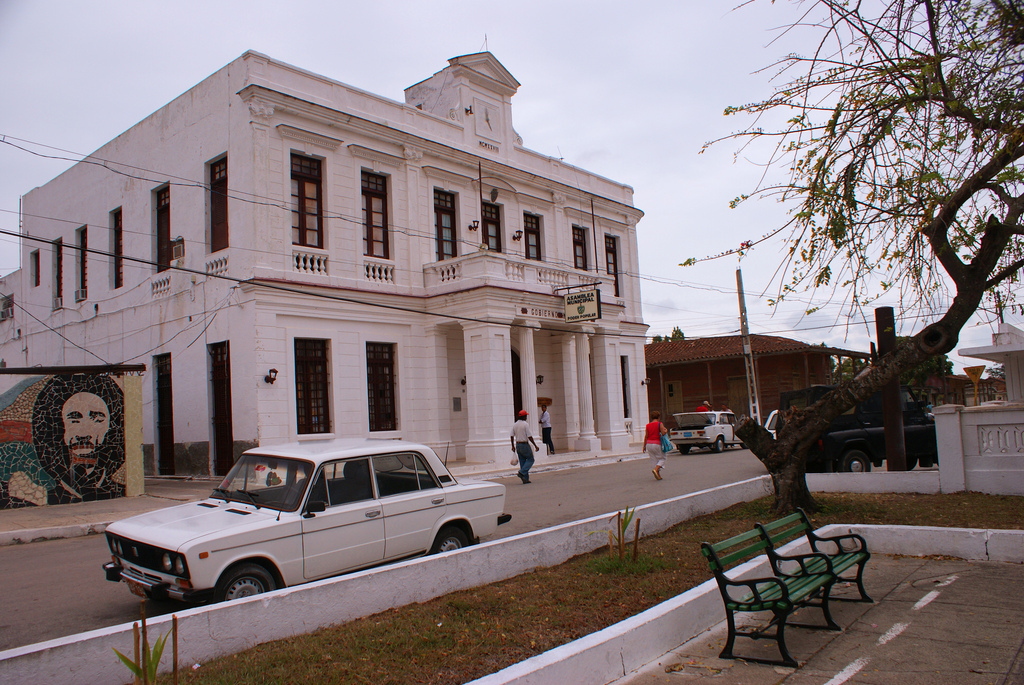
Yaguajay's town hall in front of town's central plaza

In 2022, the municipality of Yaguajay had a population of 53,375. With a total area of 1,032 km^{2} (398 sq mi), it has a population density of 52/km^{2} (130/sq mi).

== Climate ==
Yaguajay has a tropical savanna climate (Köppen: Aw).

Climate data for Yaguajay
| Month | Jan | Feb | Mar | Apr | May | Jun | Jul | Aug | Sep | Oct | Nov | Dec | Year |
|---|---|---|---|---|---|---|---|---|---|---|---|---|---|
| Mean daily maximum °C (°F) | 25.7 (78.3) | 27.1 (80.8) | 28.0 (82.4) | 29.5 (85.1) | 30.0 (86.0) | 30.8 (87.4) | 31.3 (88.3) | 31.4 (88.5) | 30.8 (87.4) | 29.2 (84.6) | 27.1 (80.8) | 26.4 (79.5) | 28.9 (84.1) |
| Daily mean °C (°F) | 21.5 (70.7) | 22.5 (72.5) | 23.2 (73.8) | 24.6 (76.3) | 25.5 (77.9) | 26.7 (80.1) | 27.1 (80.8) | 27.1 (80.8) | 26.6 (79.9) | 25.5 (77.9) | 23.6 (74.5) | 22.6 (72.7) | 24.7 (76.5) |
| Mean daily minimum °C (°F) | 18.2 (64.8) | 19.0 (66.2) | 19.4 (66.9) | 20.9 (69.6) | 22.4 (72.3) | 23.8 (74.8) | 24.1 (75.4) | 24.2 (75.6) | 23.8 (74.8) | 23.0 (73.4) | 20.9 (69.6) | 19.8 (67.6) | 21.6 (70.9) |
| Average precipitation mm (inches) | 10.4 (0.41) | 10.1 (0.40) | 12.8 (0.50) | 27.3 (1.07) | 59.3 (2.33) | 78.2 (3.08) | 79.7 (3.14) | 93.9 (3.70) | 97.6 (3.84) | 70.2 (2.76) | 29.1 (1.15) | 17.9 (0.70) | 586.5 (23.08) |
Source: Weather.Directory

== Notable people ==
- José Miller
- Taismary Agüero, Cuban-Italian volleyball player
- Luis Valdés Larralde, MD Discoverer of the Cuevas de Valdés
