= Taguasco =

- Municipality
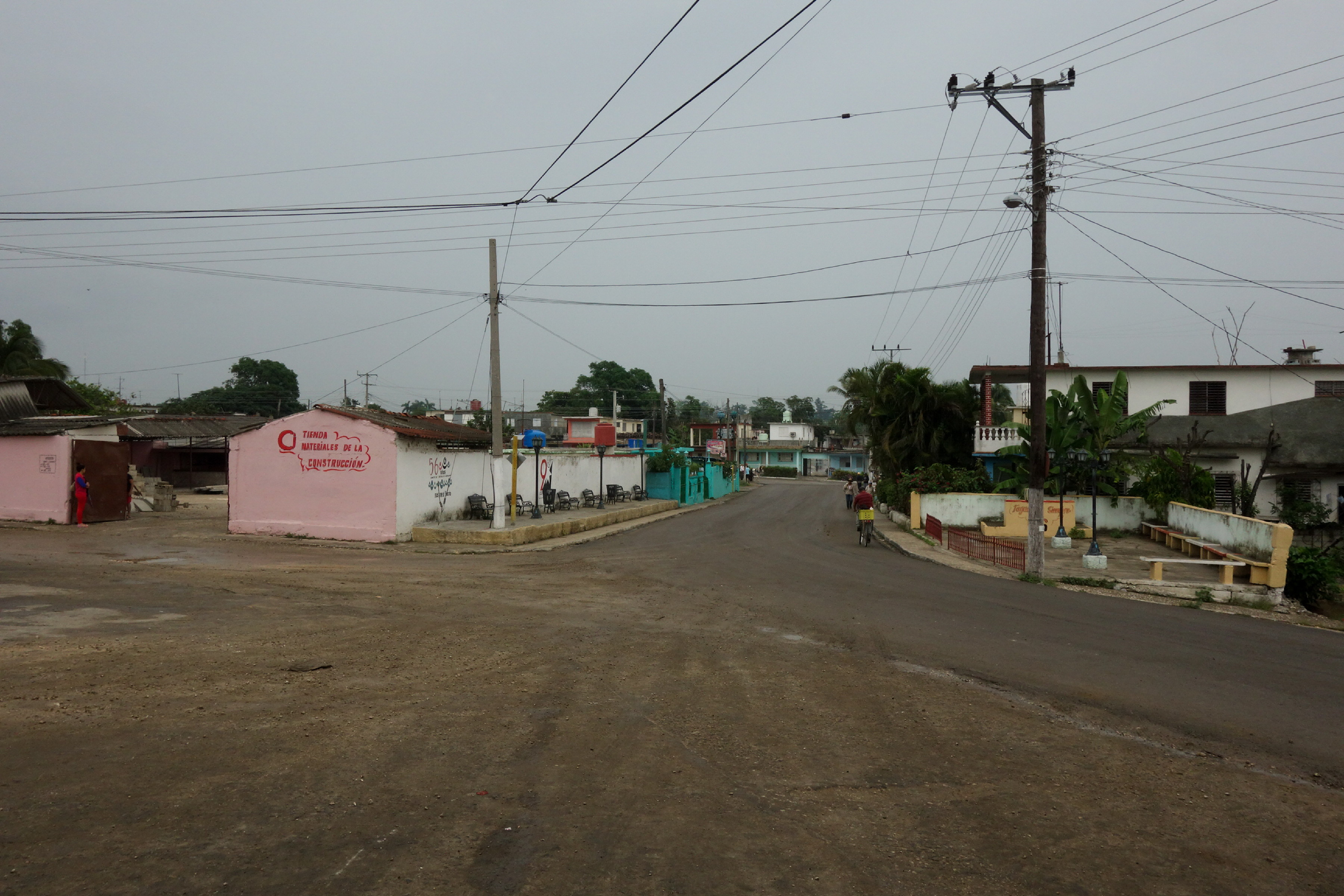

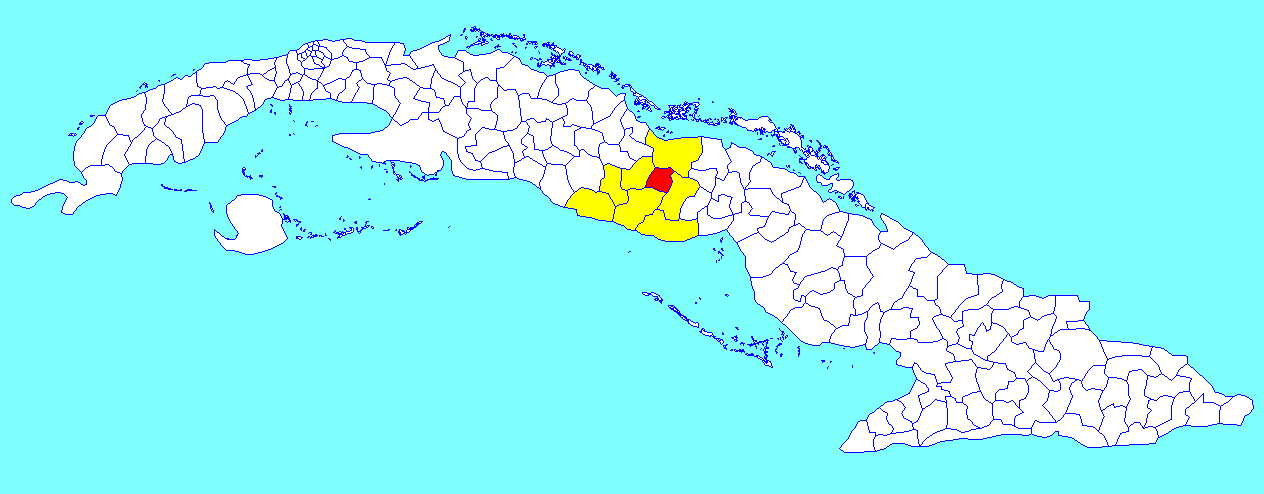
- Taguasco municipality (red) within Sancti Spíritus Province (yellow) and Cuba
- Coordinates: 22°00′18″N 79°15′54″W
- Country: Cuba
- Province: Sancti Spíritus

Area
  - Total: 518 km^{2} (200 sq mi)
- Elevation: 100 m (330 ft)

Population (2022)
  - Total: 32,968
  - Density: 63.6/km^{2} (165/sq mi)
- Time zone: UTC-5 (EST)
- Area code: +53-41
- Website: https://taguasco.gob.cu/

Taguasco (Spanish pronunciation: [taˈɣwasko]) is a municipality and town in the Sancti Spíritus Province of Cuba.

== Geography ==
It is located 20 kilometres (12 mi) north-east of Sancti Spiritus, the provincial capital, and is bisected by Carretera Central highway between Cabaiguán and Jatibonico.

== Demographics ==
In 2022, the municipality of Taguasco had a population of 32,968. With a total area of 518 km^{2} (200 sq mi), it has a population density of 64/km^{2} (170/sq mi).

== See also ==
- Municipalities of Cuba
- List of cities in Cuba
