= Sancti Spíritus Province =

Province of Cuba

Sancti Spíritus
- Province of Cuba
- Provincia de Sancti Spíritus (Spanish); Province of Sancti Spiritus (English)
- Coat of arms

- Country: Cuba
- Capital: Sancti Spíritus

Area
  - Total: 6,779.81 km^{2} (2,617.70 sq mi)

Population (2022)
  - Total: 459,173
  - Density: 67.7265/km^{2} (175.411/sq mi)
- Time zone: UTC-5 (EST)
- Area code: +53-41
- HDI (2019): 0.767 high · 12th of 16
- Website: https://www.espirituano.gob.cu/

Sancti Spíritus (Spanish pronunciation: [ˈsaŋktjesˈpiɾitus]) is one of the provinces of Cuba. Its capital is the identically named Sancti Spíritus. Another major city is Trinidad.

== Geography ==
The southern coast of the province is flat, but the western portion of Sancti Spíritus province is mountainous. The southeast has numerous mangroves and swamps. The northern coast contains significant wetlands and protected areas such as the Bay of Buena Vista and the Caguanes National Park.

The largest man-made reservoir in Cuba, the Embalse Zaza, is in Sancti Spíritus province.

== History ==
During the 17th century, both Dutch and British pirates attempted to take control of what is today Sancti Spíritus province, but with little success, as the Spanish garrison held them off. From 1660 to 1680, Trinidad was plagued by pirates from Jamaica and Tortuga, and on two occasions, pirates razed the city.

The provinces of Cienfuegos, Sancti Spíritus, and Villa Clara were once all part of the now defunct province of Las Villas.

== Economy ==
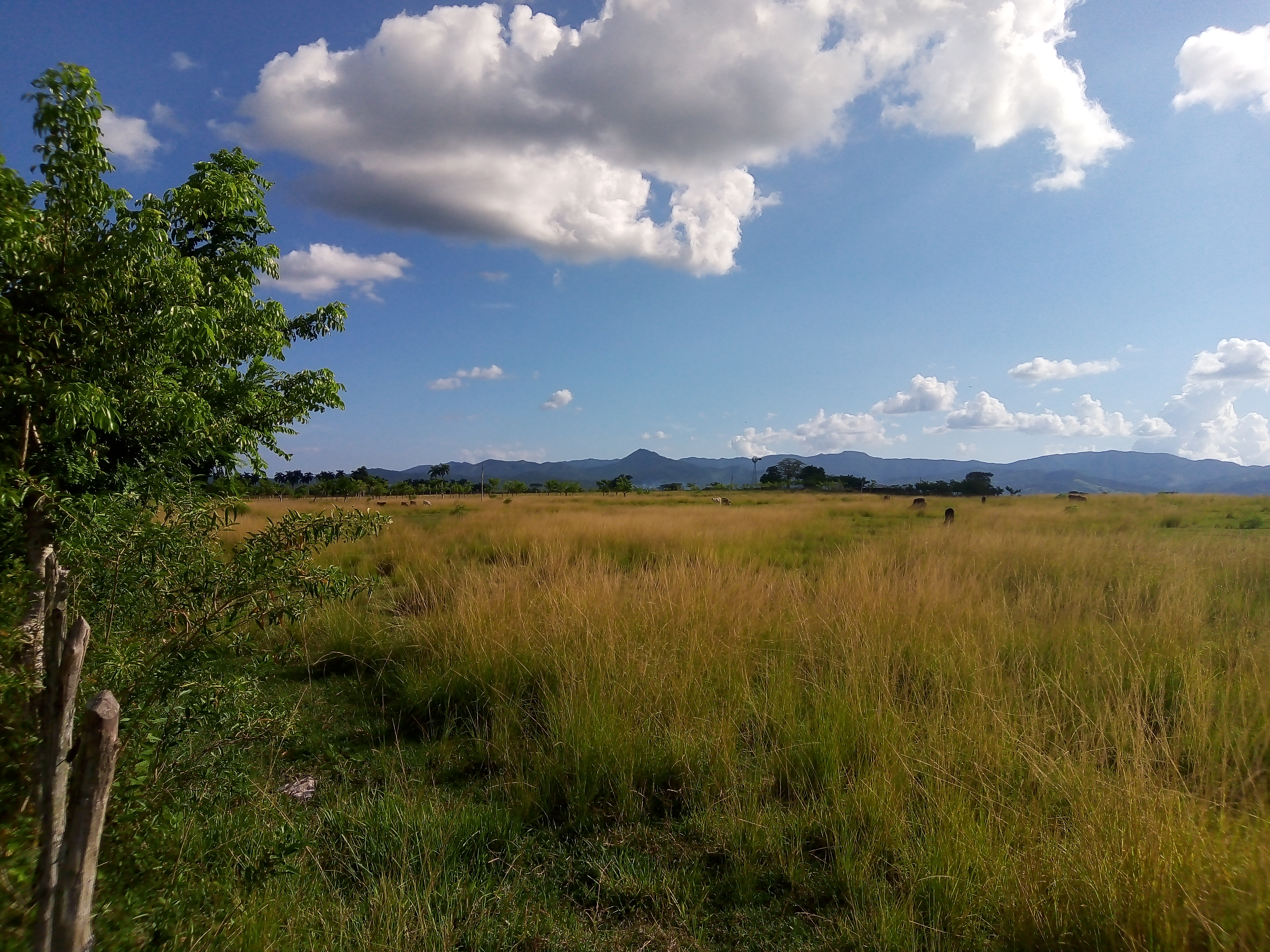
Landscape in province Sancti Spíritus (August 2020)

Tourism is a big earner for the province, with most of the tourism centered on the old city of Trinidad, a World Heritage-listed city which has dozens of colonial buildings (and almost no 20th-century architecture), dating back to the Spanish conquest in the 16th century.

Francisco Iznaga, a Basque landowner in the western portion of Cuba during the first thirty years of the colonization of Cuba, was elected Mayor of Bayamo in 1540. Iznaga was the originator of a powerful lineage which finally settled in Sancti Spíritus and Trinidad, the location of the Torre Iznaga. His descendants fought for the independence of Cuba and for annexation to the U.S., from 1820 to 1900.

In the area, as with most of Cuba, sugar cane and cattle are important commodities. Large surfaces are irrigated in the farmland between Zaza Reservoir, Zaza River, and Jatibonico River in La Sierpe region. Some tobacco and rice are also grown.

== Municipalities ==
Municipality	Population (2022)	Area (km^{2})	Area (sq mi)	Location	Remarks
Cabaiguán	63,981	597	231	22.08389°N 79.49528°W	
Fomento	31,131	471	182	22.10528°N 79.72000°W	
Jatibonico	42,027	765	295	21.94639°N 79.16750°W	
La Sierpe	16,573	1,035	400	21.76083°N 79.24333°W	
Sancti Spíritus	142,618	1,151	444	21.93417°N 79.44361°W	Provincial capital
Taguasco	32,968	518	200	22.00528°N 79.26500°W	
Trinidad	76,500	1,155	446	21.80444°N 79.98278°W	
Yaguajay	53,375	1,032	398	22.33056°N 79.23694°W	

Source: Population from 2022 estimates. Area from 1976 municipal re-distribution.

== Demographics ==
In 2004, the province of Sancti Spiritus had a population of 463,009. With a total area of 6,736.51 km^{2} (2,600.98 sq mi), the province had a population density of 68.7/km^{2} (178/sq mi). In 2022 the population was estimated to be 459,173.
