= Jatibonico =

- Municipality
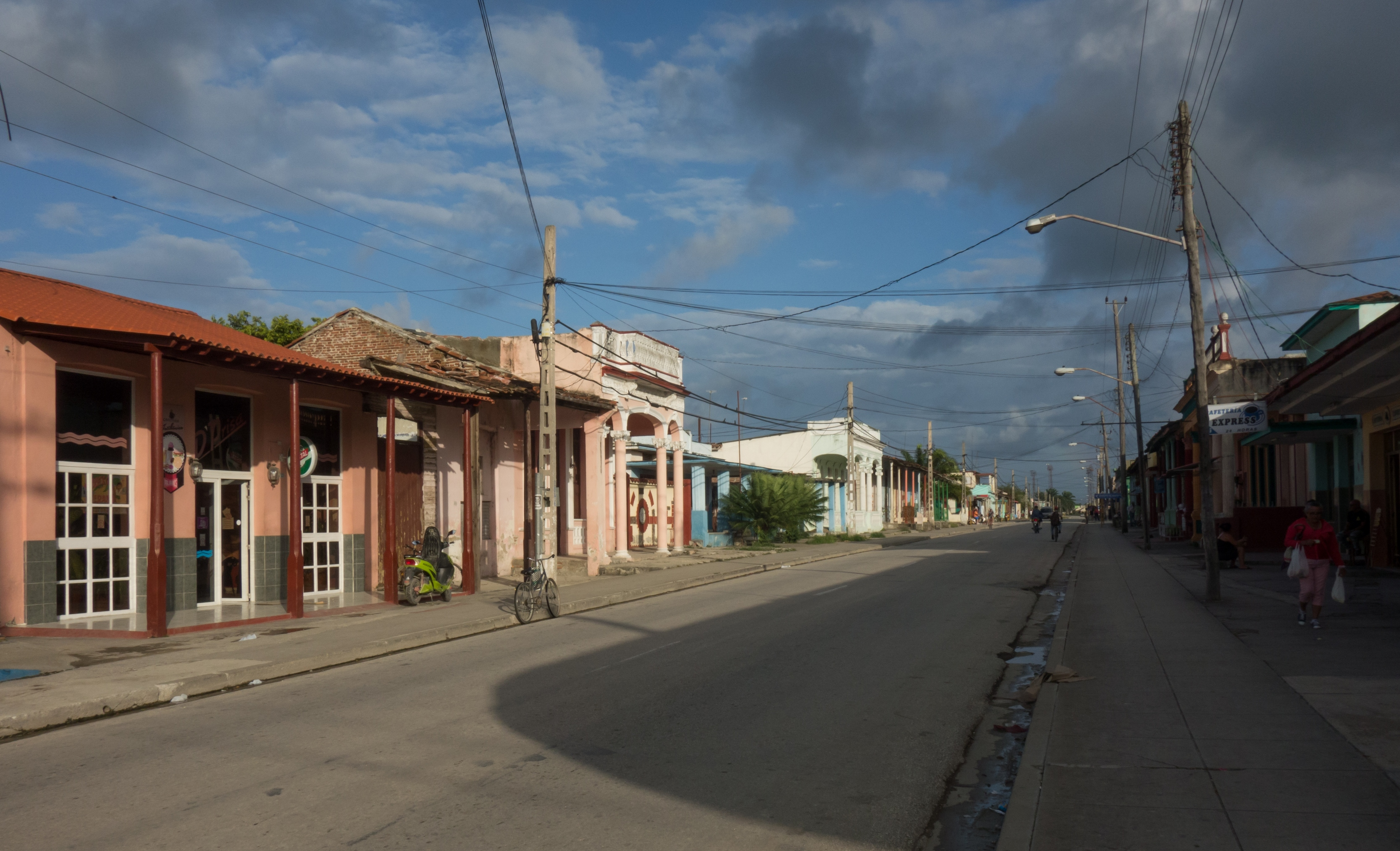

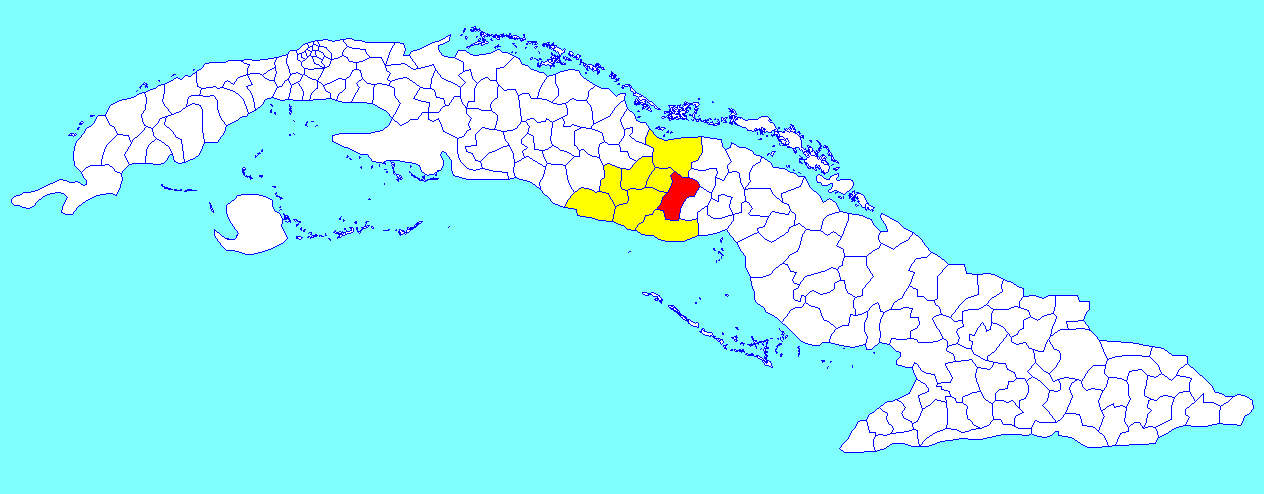
- Jatibonico municipality (red) within Sancti Spíritus Province (yellow) and Cuba
- Coordinates: 21°56′47″N 79°10′3″W
- Country: Cuba
- Province: Sancti Spíritus
- Established: April 1904

Area
  - Total: 765 km^{2} (295 sq mi)
- Elevation: 347 m (1,138 ft)

Population (2022)
  - Total: 42,027
  - Density: 54.9/km^{2} (142/sq mi)
- Time zone: UTC-6 (EST)
- Postal code: 62200
- Area code: +53-41-88xxxx
- Website: https://jatibonico.gob.cu/

Jatibonico is a municipality and town in the Sancti Spíritus Province of Cuba.

== Demographics ==
In 2022, the municipality of Jatibonico had a population of 42,027. With a total area of 765 km^{2} (295 sq mi), it has a population density of 55/km^{2} (140/sq mi).

== Catholic Parish Church ==
A gallery of stained glass windows can be found at Jatibonico's St. Joseph Catholic Parish Church, unique in its kind in the whole of Cuba.

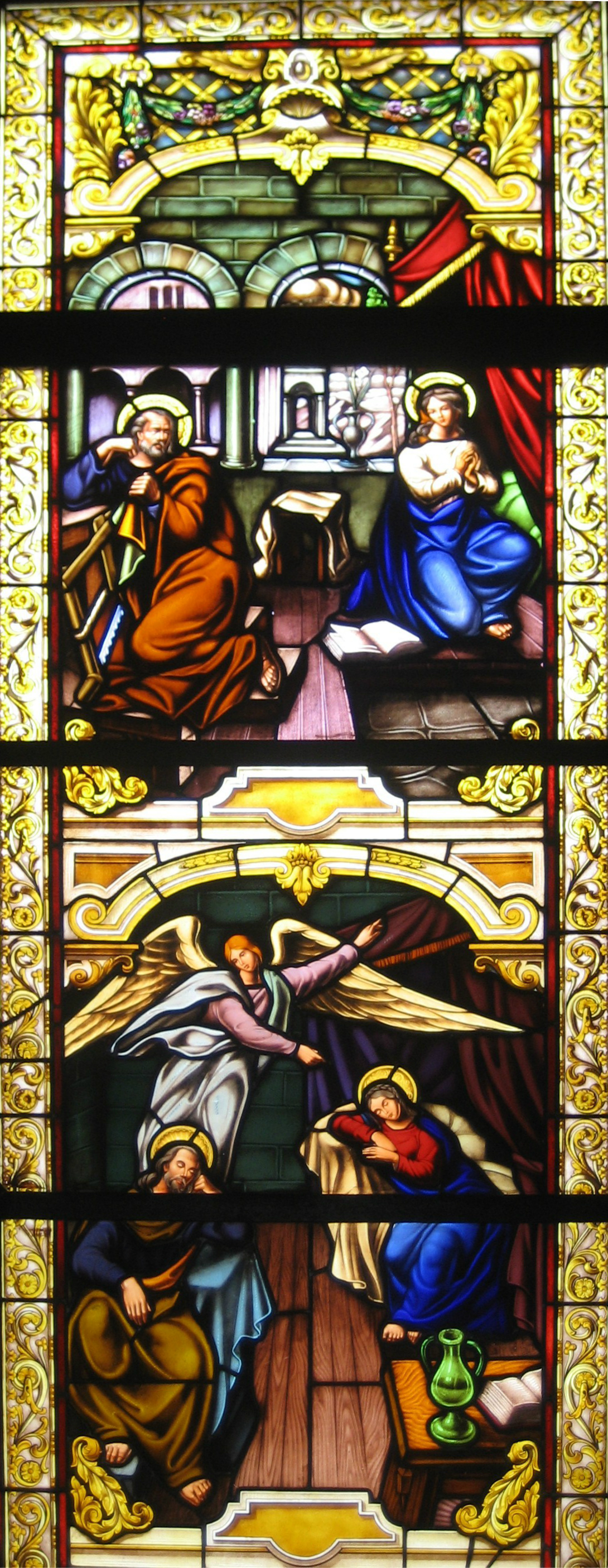
Stained glass where Joseph resolved to send Mary away quietly (Matthew 1:18–25).

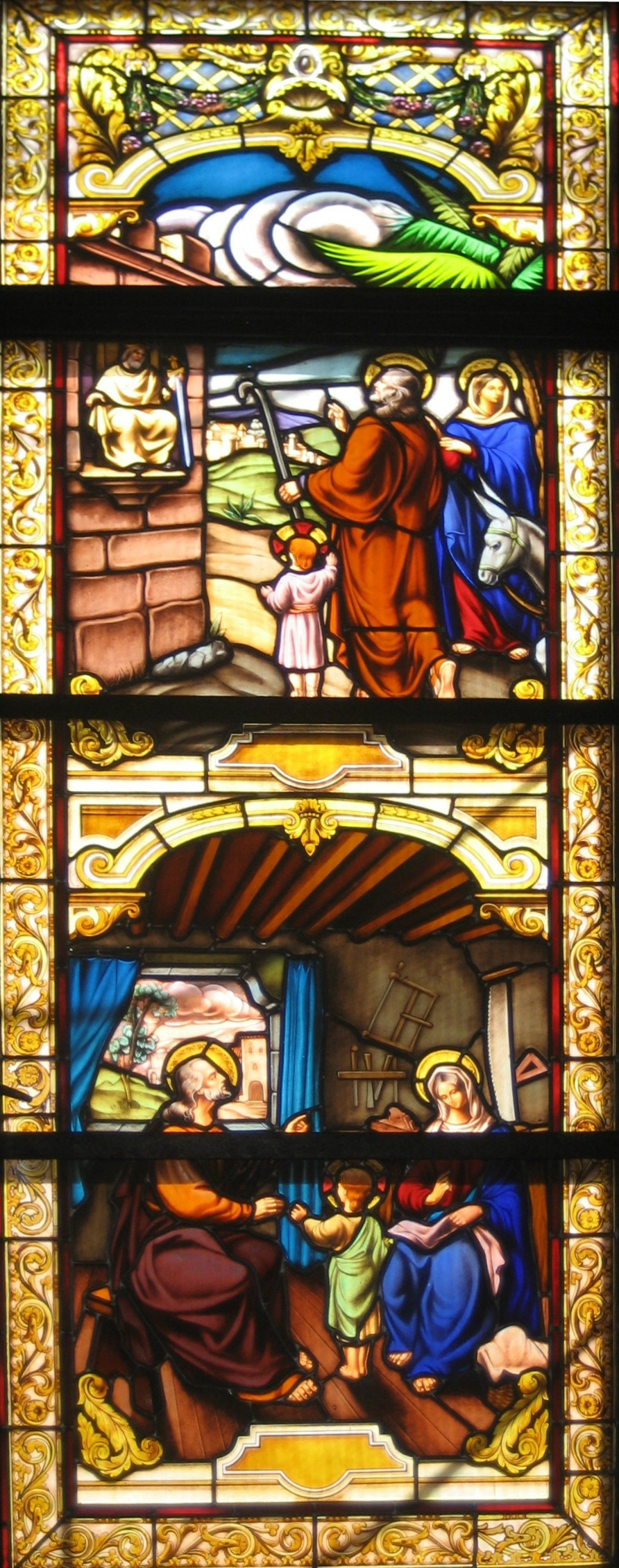
Stained glass representing the Sacred Family returd to Nazareth (Matthew 2:19–23).

== Jatibonico Oil Field ==
The Jatibonico Oil Field was discovered in the early 1950s by Grupo Jarueca after surface oil seeps were noticed in the area. Oil was discovered at a depth of about 1,100 feet in a marly shale within a structural high. This was the first new field discovered in the post-World War II era and the start of several more fields in the Central Basin of Cuba.

== See also ==
- Municipalities of Cuba
- List of cities in Cuba
