= University of Medical Sciences =

University of Medical Sciences may refer to:

== China ==
- Bethune University of Medical Sciences, Changchun, Jilin
- Capital University of Medical Sciences, Beijing
- Chongqing University of Medical Sciences, Chongqing
- Sun Yat-sen University of Medical Sciences, Guangzhou, Guangdong
- West China University of Medical Sciences, Chengdu, Sichuan

== Iran ==
- Ahvaz Jundishapur University of Medical Sciences
- Arak University of Medical Sciences
- Ardabil University of Medical Sciences
- Babol University of Medical Sciences
- Baqiyatallah University of Medical Sciences
- Birjand University of Medical Sciences
- Bushehr University of Medical Sciences
- Fatemiye University of Medical Sciences, Qom
- Gilan University of Medical Sciences
- Hamedan University of Medical Sciences
- Ilam University of Medical Sciences
- Iran University of Medical Sciences
- Isfahan University of Medical Sciences
- Kashan University of Medical Sciences
- Kerman University of Medical Sciences
- Kermanshah University of Medical Sciences
- Mashhad University of Medical Sciences
- Mazandaran University of Medical Sciences
- Qazvin University of Medical Sciences
- Qom University of Medical Sciences
- Shahid Beheshti University of Medical Sciences, formerly the National University of Iran
- Shahid Sadoughi University of Medical Sciences and Health Services
- Shahrekord University of Medical Sciences
- Shiraz University of Medical Sciences
- Tabriz University of Medical Sciences, split in 1985 from the University of Tabriz
- Tehran University of Medical Sciences
- Torbat Heydarieh University of Medical Sciences
- Urmia University of Medical Sciences

== Japan ==
- Gifu University of Medical Science
- Morinomiya University of Medical Sciences
- Shiga University of Medical Science
- Suzuka University of Medical Science

== Other ==
- The University of Medical Sciences of Mahidol University, Thailand
- Semmelweis University of Medical Sciences, Hungary
- University of Medical Sciences, Ondo, Nigeria
- Poznan University of Medical Sciences, Poland
- University of Medical Sciences, Cienfuegos, Cuba
- Kerala University of Health Sciences
- National University of Medical Sciences, Pakistan

It may also refer to:

- Allianze University College of Medical Sciences, Malaysia
- Kathmandu University School of Medical Sciences, Nepal
- Liaquat University of Medical and Health Sciences, Pakistan
- Nova Southeastern University College of Medical Sciences, Florida, USA
- University College of Medical Sciences, Delhi, India
- University of Arkansas for Medical Sciences, USA
- University of Medical Sciences and Technology, Sudan
- University of Medical Sciences, Turkey
