= José María Aguirre T9 =

Jose Maria Aguirre T9 (Cuba) & (Pakistan)
- Motto: Serve the Humanity
- Established: 2008
- Dean: Dr. Reynaldo Charnicharo Vidal
- Administrative staff: 100 (All Cubans)
- Students: 293 (All Pakistanis)
- Location: Jagüey Grande, Matanzas Province, Cuba
- Colors: Blue, White
- Affiliations: ELAM; HEC; WHO; PMDC

José María Aguirre (T-9) is a school of medicine located in a small community San Jose de Marcos near municipality Jagüey Grande situated in Matanzas Province, Cuba. The school is named after the 19th Century Cuban revolutionary general José María Aguirre. The school primarily hosts medical students from Pakistan.

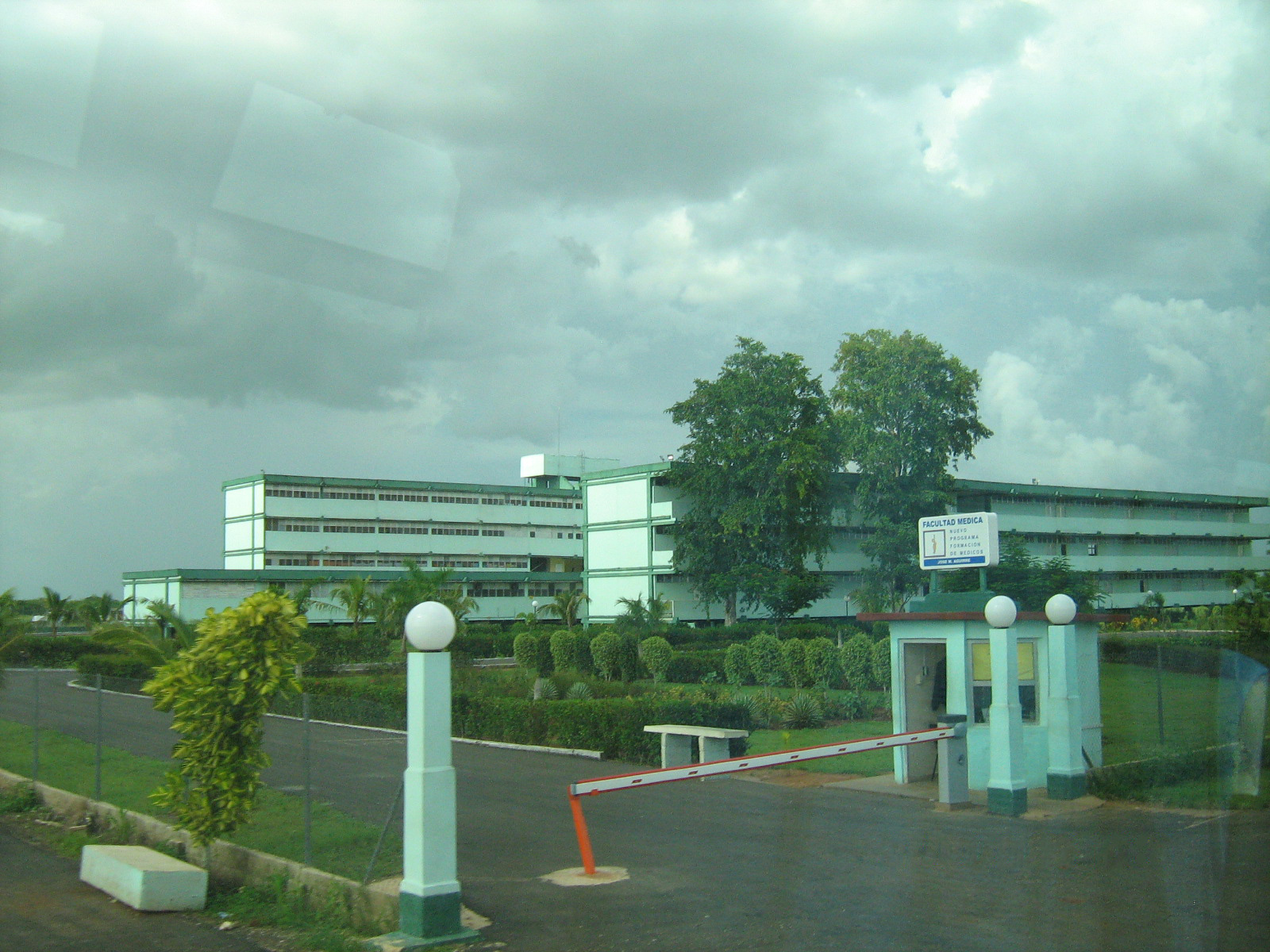
Jose Maria Aguirre (T-9) Main Building

== Official Name ==
The New Program of Formation of Doctors, Policlinical Faculty, Jose Maria Aguirre T-9, San Jose de Marcos, Jaguey Grande, Matanzas, Cuba. (In English)
Nuevo Programa de Formacion de Medicos, Facultad Policlínico, José María Aguirre T-9, San José de Marcos, Jagüey Grande, Matanzas, Cuba. (In Spanish or Español)

== Locality ==
The Campus is present beside the community San Jose de Marcos on the main road to Havana, Matanzas, and Varadero. Municipalities such as Jaguey Grande, Jovellanos, and Agramonte are just a few kilometers from the school.

== History ==
The 2005 Pakistan earthquake was centered in Azad Kashmir, near the city of Muzaffarabad, affecting a lot of areas of Azad Kashmir and North-West Frontier Province regions of Pakistan. In the International response to the 2005 Kashmir earthquake, many countries, international organizations and non-governmental organizations offered relief aid to the affected regions. Cuba also offered 1,000 scholarships in Medicine for Pakistani students under the title of General and Comprehensive Medicine (Equal to MBBS of Pakistan). The Project was handed over to Higher Education Commission of Pakistan. The first batch of the approximately 384 students reached from Pakistan to Cuba in the month of February 2007 which were sent to the Faculty of Medicine Máximo Santiago Haza J4 Jaguey Grande, Matanzas Province. A 2nd Batch of more than 600 students reached from Pakistan to Cuba in May 2008. The Batch 2 students were sent to two different schools, Jose Maria Agurrie T9 and Antonio Ramon Horta AG7 in the same municipality Jaguey Grande. All these Faculties are under the Project The New Program For The Formation of Doctors (Nuevo Programa de Formación de Médicos Latinoamericanos). Some other Faculties for medical studies under the same Project are also located in the same municipality for the students of People's Republic of China, Mexico, Peru, Ecuador, Bolivia, Paraguay, Guatemala, and the Caribbean Islands. All the Pakistanis students who passed 2 years in this Campus are presently studying in University of Medical Sciences, Cienfuegos.

== Campus ==
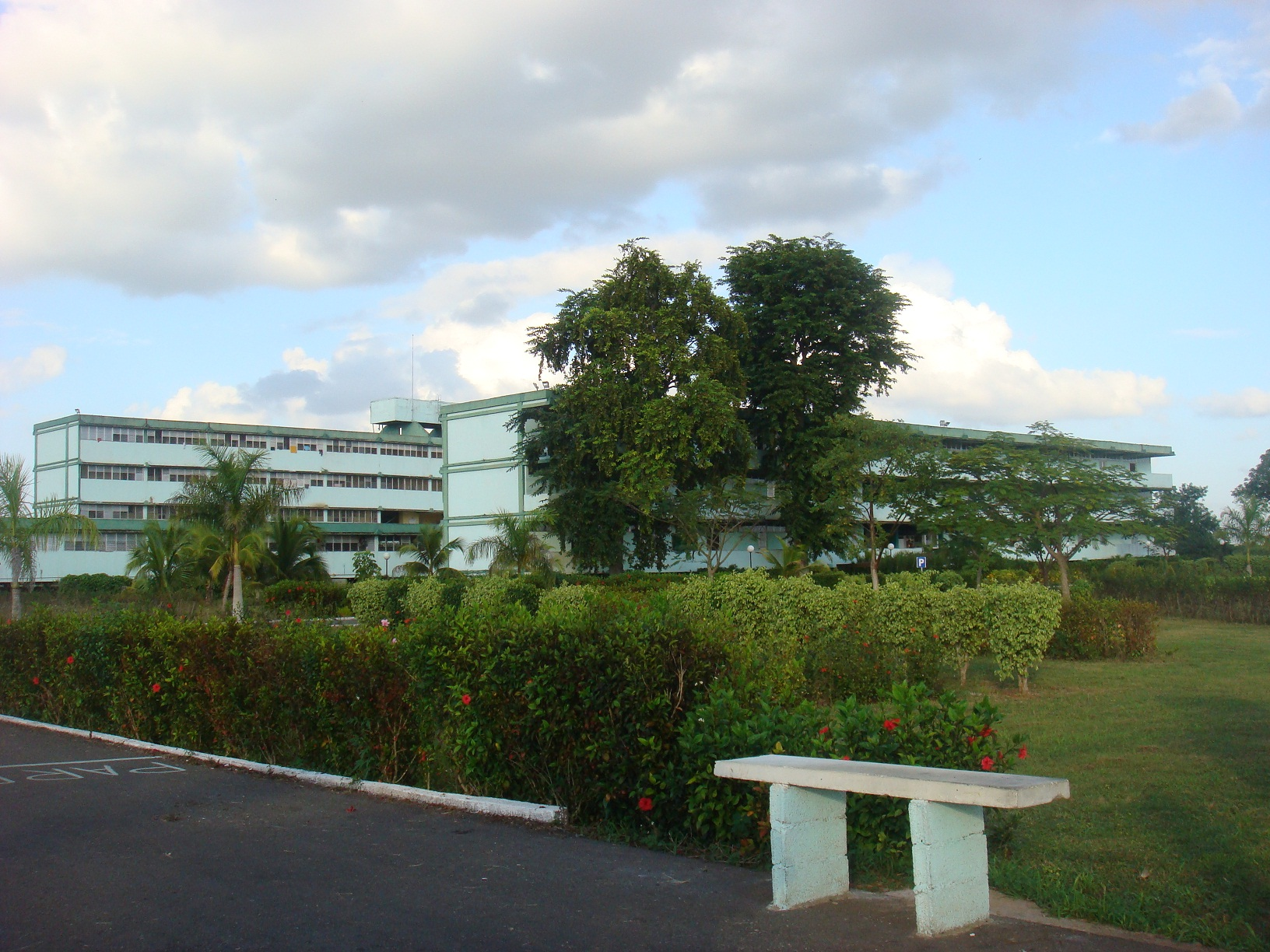
Front view of the campus Jose Maria Aguirre T9

Presently there are 289 students (226 male and 63 female) on the campus.

== Academics ==
All subjects are taught in Spanish language (Español). The course for the students consists of 1-year Spanish language and pre-medical, 5 years of Medical studies and 1-year internship (House Job) (In Cuba or in Pakistan).

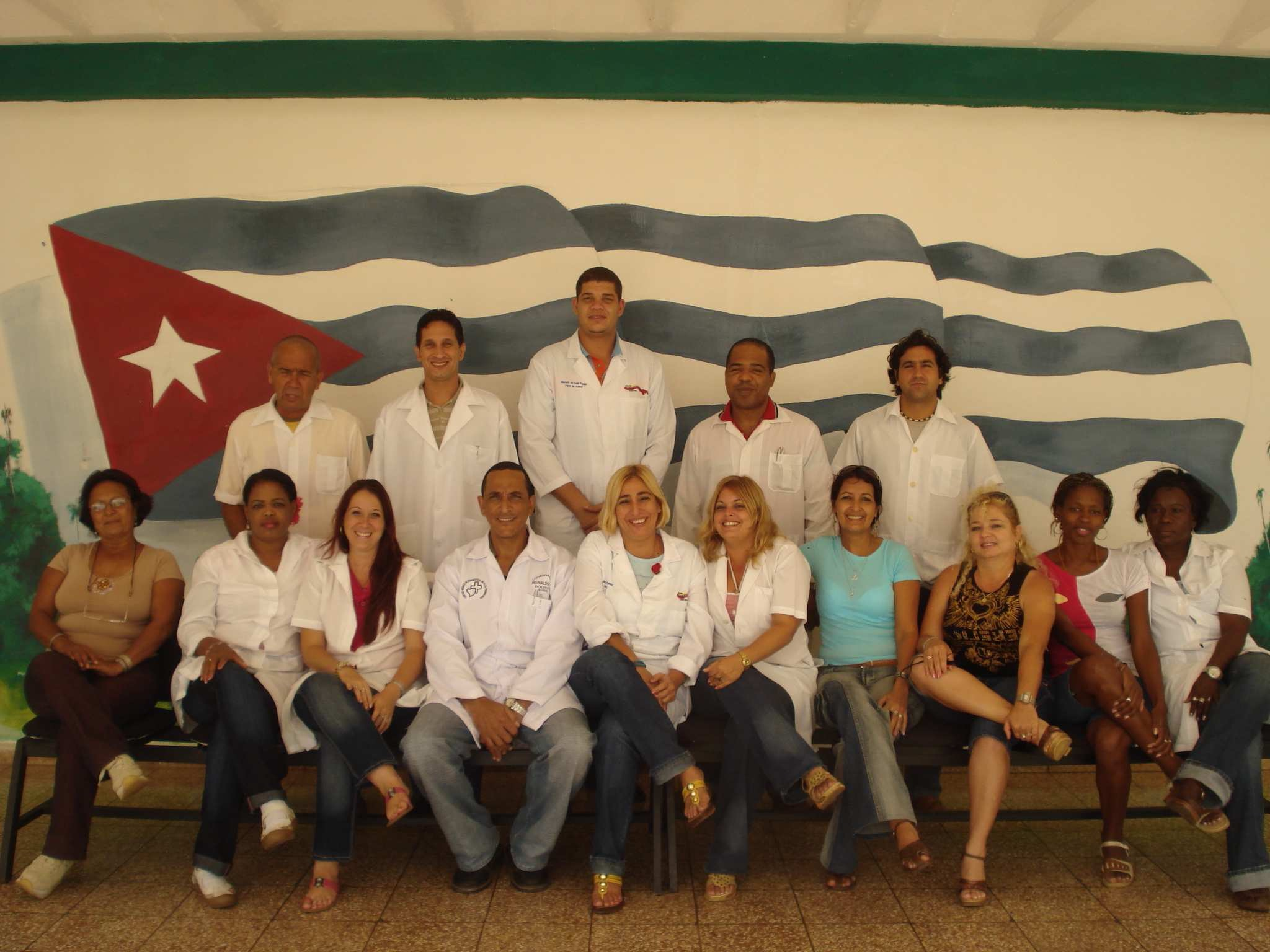
Professors of Jose Maria Aguirre T9

== Gallery ==
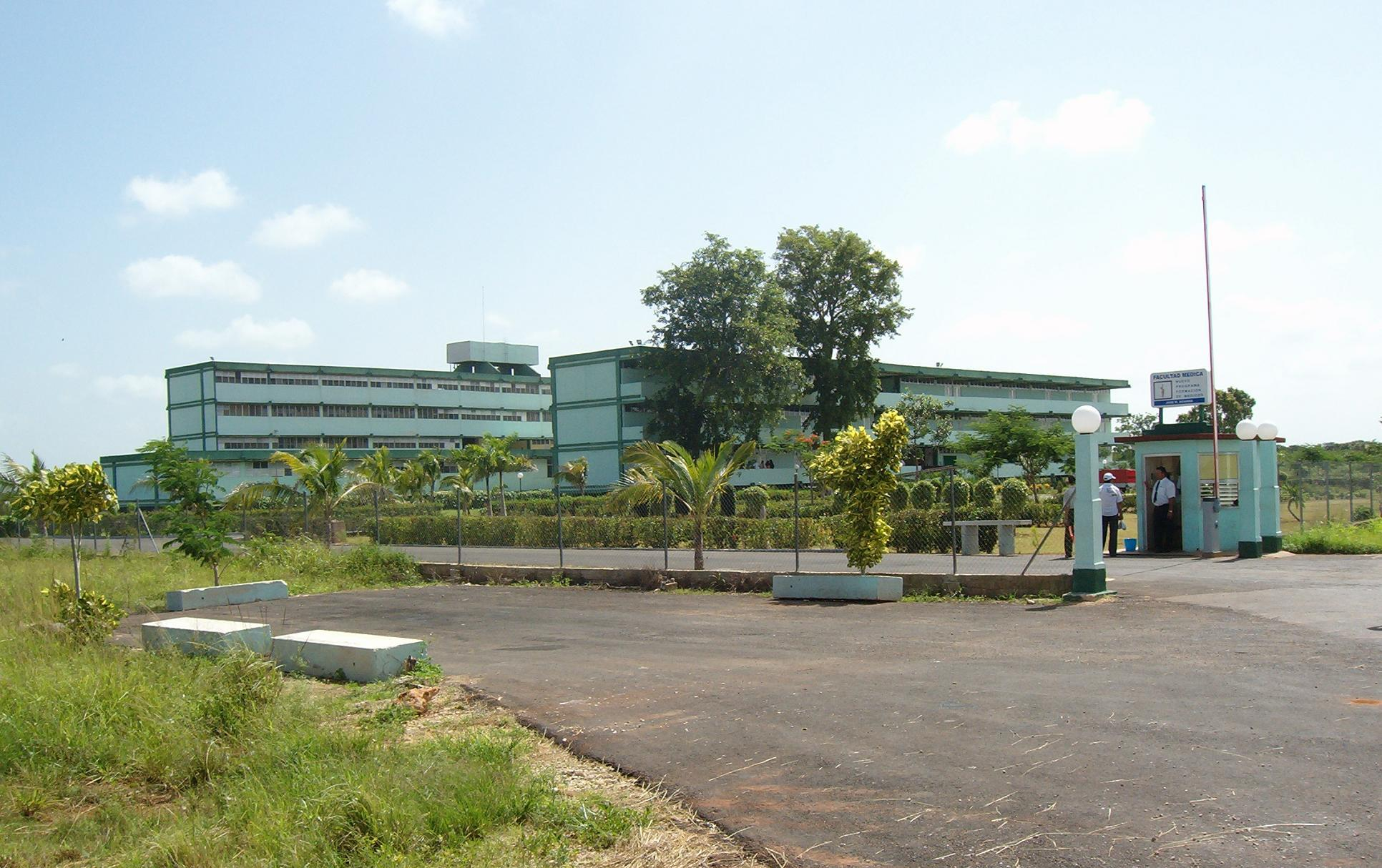
Front view of the campus

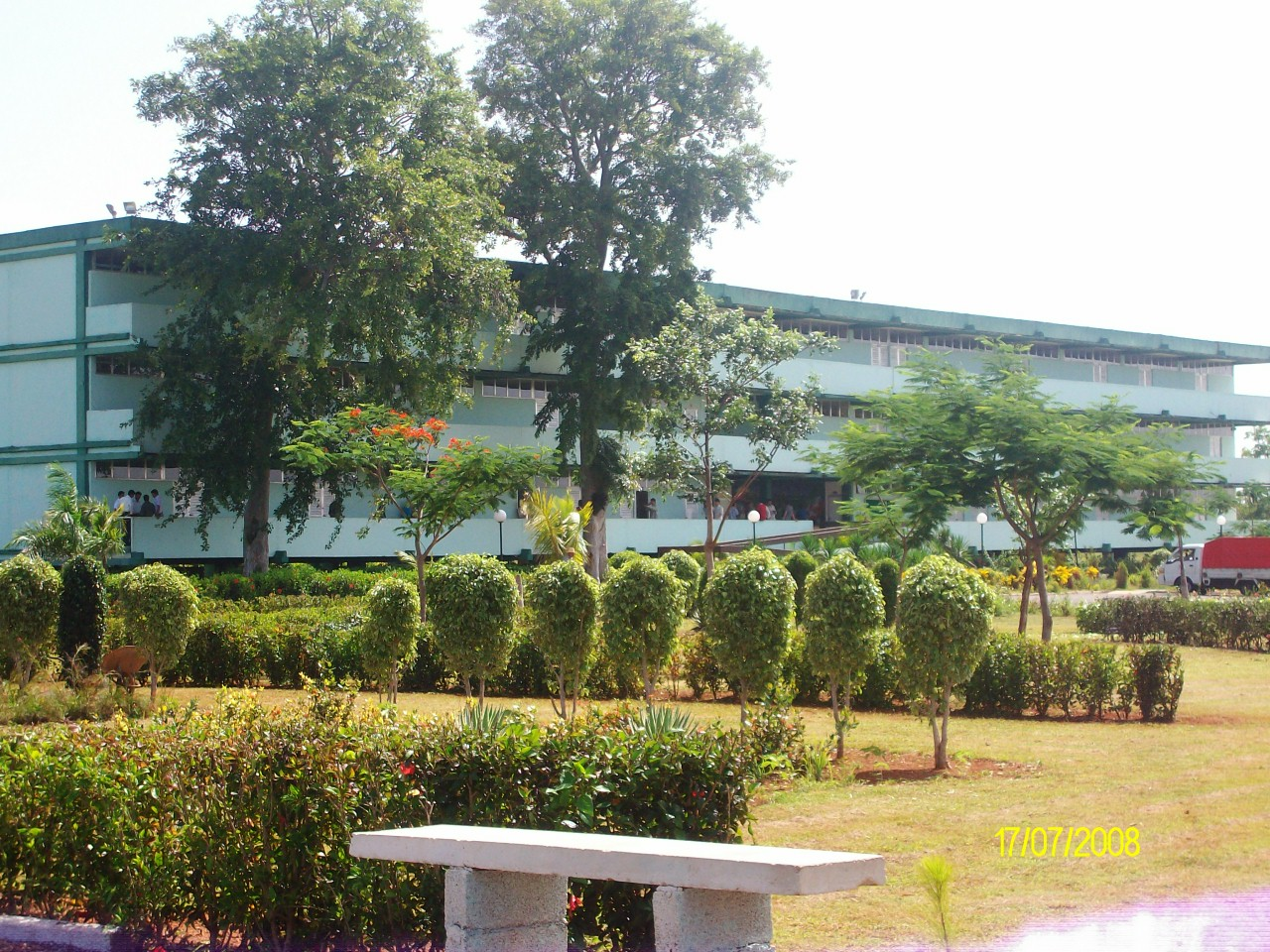
Front view of the academic block

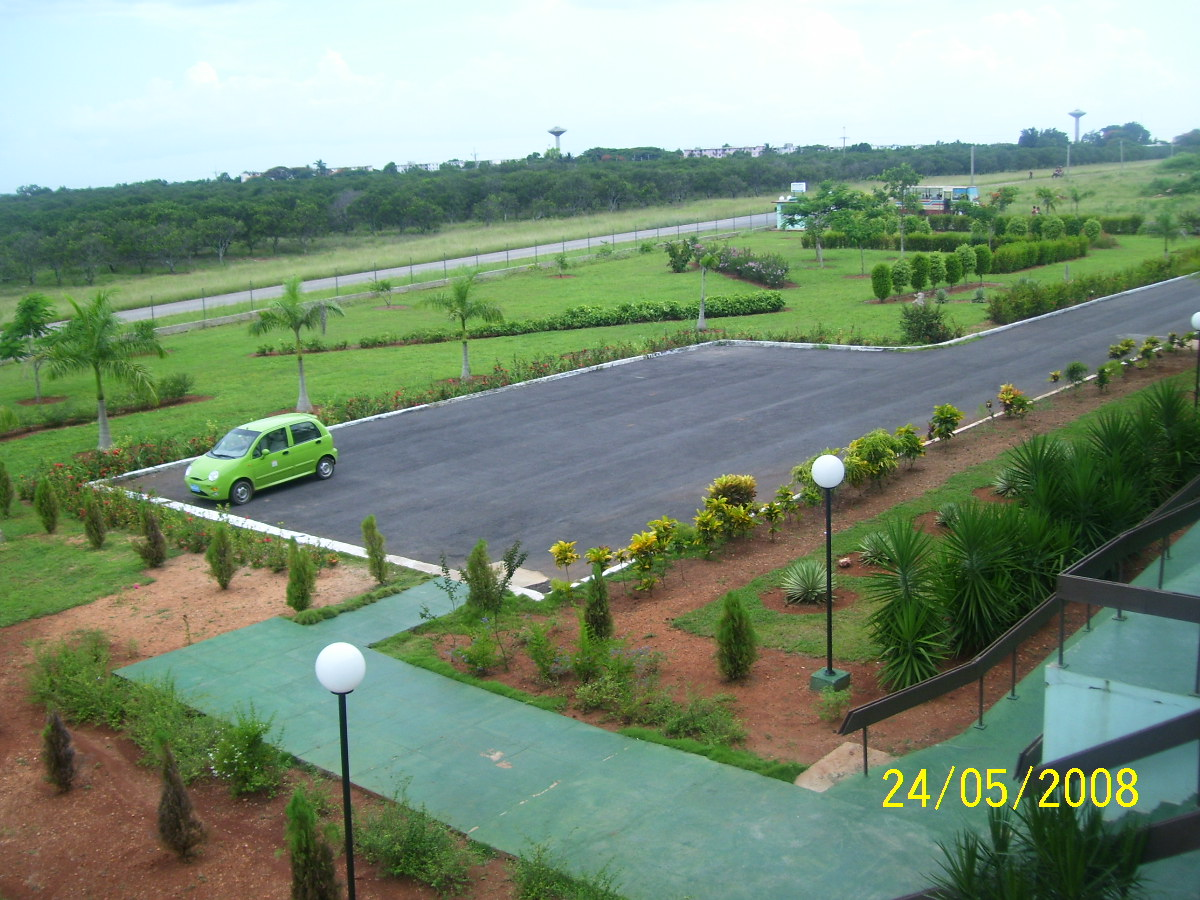
Front garden and parking area

== See also ==
- Forest siege (2010)
- Máximo Santiago Haza
- ELAM (Latin American School of Medicine) Cuba
