= Nicklaus Children's Hospital =

Coordinates: 25°44′29.25″N 80°17′39.36″W

Geography
- Location: Miami - Dade, Broward, Palm Beach, and Martin, Florida, United States

Organization
- Type: Children's hospital
- Affiliated university: FIU Herbert Wertheim College of Medicine, Nova Southeastern University, St. George's University

Services
- Emergency department: Level I Pediatric Trauma Center
- Beds: 325

History
- Former names: Miami Children's Hospital; Variety Children's Hospital
- Founded: 1950

Links
- Website: www.nicklauschildrens.org
- Lists: Hospitals in Florida

Nicklaus Children's Hospital, formerly known as Miami Children's Hospital, is a hospital for children in South Florida. The hospital has 289 beds. It is affiliated with the FIU Herbert Wertheim College of Medicine, Nova Southeastern University, and St. George's University and is a member of Nicklaus Children's Health System. The hospital provides comprehensive pediatric specialties and subspecialties to pediatric patients aged 0–21 throughout South Florida. Nicklaus Children's Hospital features the only Level 1 pediatric trauma center in the region, and 1 of 3 in the state. It has 650 attending physicians and over 130 pediatric sub-specialists. Nicklaus Children's Hospital was one of the largest employers in Miami-Dade County in 2014 with over 3,500 employees.

== History ==
In the 1940s, the Miami chapter #33 of Variety, the Children's Charity was founded. Its goal was to help indigent children. Variety joined forces with a new hospital that was being built outside Coral Gables that was in need of financial assistance. Variety Children's Hospital opened its doors on March 20, 1950, just as the polio epidemic was encompassing the United States. Variety Children's Hospital was soon deemed the southern center for persons suffering from polio. In 1983, the hospital was renamed Miami Children's Hospital. The non-profit, freestanding hospital is internationally recognized for outstanding medical care, research and innovation. In 2015, the hospital was named Nicklaus Children's Hospital after a generous pledge from golf icon Jack Nicklaus and his wife Barbara and their Nicklaus Children's Health Care Foundation.

When Hurricane Katrina first hit New Orleans in August 2005, Nicklaus Children's Hospital (along with other hospitals) sent helicopters to Tulane Medical Center, Ochsner, and CHNOLA in order to help evacuate pediatric patients from the hospital.

== About ==
Founded in 1950 by Variety Clubs International, Nicklaus Children’s Hospital is South Florida’s only licensed specialty hospital exclusively for children, with approximately 800 attending physicians, including more than 500 pediatric sub specialists. The 325-bed hospital, known as Miami Children’s Hospital from 1983 through 2014, is renowned for excellence in all aspects of pediatric medicine with many specialty programs routinely ranked among the best in the nation by U.S. News & World Report since 2008. The hospital is also home to the largest pediatric teaching program in the southeastern United States and since 2003 has been designated an American Nurses Credentialing Center (ANCC) Magnet facility, the nursing profession’s most prestigious institutional honor.

=== Mission and Vision ===
To inspire hope and promote lifelong health by providing the best care to every child.

To CREATE a healthy future for every child.

=== Values and Guiding Behaviors ===
- C ollaboration
- R esponsibility
- E mpowerment
- A dvocacy
- T ransformation
- E mpathy

=== Graduate medical education ===
Nicklaus Children's Hospital operates a medical residency program that trains newly graduated physicians (MD and DO) in the specialty of pediatrics. The program is dually accredited by the Accreditation Council for Graduate Medical Education and the American Osteopathic Association.

=== Nicklaus Children’s Hospital Foundation ===
Nicklaus Children's Hospital Foundation (NCHF), is a not-for-profit 501(c)(3) organization with the sole purpose of supporting Nicklaus Children's Hospital.

Following the death of his six-year-old granddaughter Shannon from leukemia, Ambassador David M. Walters vowed that no child ever need leave South Florida to receive quality medical care. In 1982, Ambassador Walters founded Miami Children's Health Foundation. Walters’ commitment to children's health and pediatric care for all children, led to the Foundation becoming one of the largest single donors to Miami Children's Hospital. It has also helped fund more than 100 clinical studies at Nicklaus Children's Hospital Research Institute.

Nicklaus Children's Health Foundation hosts various events each year to raise money, including its Diamond Ball. Throughout the year, Foundation volunteers create positive grassroots fundraising events to benefit the Foundation and the hospital, such as toy drives, flower sales, carnivals, bike races, walkathons, paper icon sales, wiffleball tournaments, chess tournaments, restaurant openings, penny jars and fountain coins. The Nicklaus Children's Hospital Corporate Golf Invitational is held annually at the Biltmore Golf Course to benefit Nicklaus Children's Hospital Foundation as well as The Club at Creighton Farms.

== See also ==
- List of children's hospitals in the United States
- Jack Nicklaus
