= Máximo Santiago Haza =

Defunct Cuban medical school for Pakistani refugees

- Type: Medical school
- Location: Jagüey Grande, Matanzas Province, Cuba; 22°36′6.09″N 81°5′47.32″W
- Campus: Rural
- Language: Spanish
- Location within Cuba

Máximo Santiago Haza -J4 was a school of medicine located in a small municipality Jagüey Grande situated in Matanzas Province, Cuba. It contained Medical students all from Pakistan till late 2009. It was one of three schools accommodated by Pakistani students during 2007 and they were evacuated by the Government because of heavy protests and students negation to further study in these schools.

== Location ==
The school is located in a small municipality Jagüey Grande situated in Matanzas Province, Cuba.

== History ==
In the International response to the 2005 Kashmir earthquake many countries, international organizations and non-governmental organizations offered relief aid to the affected regions. Cuba also offered 1000 scholarships in Medicine for Pakistani students under the title of General and Comprehensive Medicine (Equal to MBBS of Pakistan). The Project was handed over to Higher Education Commission of Pakistan. The first batch of the approximately 384 students reached from Pakistan to Cuba in the month of February 2007 which were sent to the Faculty of Medicine Máximo Santiago Haza J4 Jaguey Grande, Matanzas Province. A 2nd Batch of more than 600 students reached from Pakistan to Cuba in May 2008. The Batch 2 students were sent to two different schools, Jose Maria Agurrie T9 and Antonio Ramon Horta AG7, in the same municipality, Jaguey Grande. All these Faculties are under the Project The New Program For The Formation of Doctors (Nuevo Programa de Formación de Médicos Latinoamericanos). Some other Faculties for medical studies under the same Project are also located in the same municipality for the students of People's Republic of China, Mexico, Peru, Ecuador, Bolivia, Paraguay, Guatemala and the Caribbean Islands.

== Academics ==
All subjects are taught in the Spanish language (Español). The course for the students consists of 1 year Spanish language and pre-medical, 5 years of Medical studies and 1 year Internship (House Job) (In Cuba or in Pakistan).

== New Program of Formation of Doctors ==
The New Program of Formation of Doctors was a Cuban government program to prepare foreign doctors to work in rural areas. But it failed as Pakistani students protested against the program, it heavily damaged Cuban government efforts for the formation of new doctors in the rural area facilitated by local small clinics with improper management and lacking basic facilities.

== See also ==
- José María Aguirre T9
- Forest siege (2010)
- ELAM (Latin American School of Medicine) Cuba
