= José Aguirre =

José Aguirre may refer to:

- José Antonio Aguirre (politician) (1904–1960), first Basque president (lehendakari), footballer for Athletic Bilbao
- José Antonio Aguirre (early Californian) (1799–1860), Spanish-born merchant and rancher in Alta California
- José Antonio Aguirre (boxer) (born 1975), Mexican boxer
- José Joaquín Aguirre (1822–1901), Chilean medic, politician and educator
- José María Aguirre (died 1896), Cuban soldier in the Cuban War of Independence
- José Aguirre (cyclist) (born 1994), Mexican track cyclist
- José Luis Aguirre (born 1967), Spanish rower

== See also ==
- José Antonio Aguirre (disambiguation)
