= José Antonio Aguirre =

José Antonio Aguirre may refer to:

- José Antonio Aguirre (politician) (1904–1960), Spanish footballer and Basque politician
- José Antonio Aguirre (early Californian) (1799–1860), Spanish-born settler in Alta California
- José Antonio Aguirre (boxer) (born 1975), Mexican world champion boxer

== See also ==
- José Aguirre (disambiguation)
