= David M. Walters =

American attorney, philanthropist and diplomat (1917–2005)

Personal Representative of the President to the Holy See
- In office July 6, 1977 – August 17, 1978
- President: Jimmy Carter
- Preceded by: Henry Cabot Lodge Jr.
- Succeeded by: Robert F. Wagner Jr.

Personal details
- Born: David McLean Walters; April 4, 1917 Cleveland, Ohio, U.S.
- Died: January 3, 2005 (aged 87)
- Education: Baldwin Wallace College (BA); University of Miami School of Law (LLB, JD)

David McLean Walters (April 4, 1917–January 3, 2005) was an American attorney, philanthropist, and diplomat who served as presidential envoy to the Holy See.

== Career ==
Walters was born in Cleveland, Ohio. He studied law and received his JD from the University of Miami School of Law in 1950. He practiced law in the private sector from 1950 to 1977. Walters held the title of Master Knight of the Order of Malta. On July 6, 1977, he was appointed by President Jimmy Carter as his envoy to the Holy See, a position he held until August 1978.

In 1982, Ambassador Walters founded Miami Children's Health Foundation. Walters’ commitment to children's health and pediatric care for all children, led to the Foundation becoming one of the largest single donors to Miami Children's Hospital. It has also helped fund more than 100 clinical studies at Nicklaus Children's Hospital Research Institute.

On June 25, 1985, President Ronald Reagan appointed him a member of the Franklin Delano Roosevelt Memorial Commission.

== Personal life ==
Walters met his wife Rebecca Carner in 1984 and they were married in 1991. David Walters died in January 2005 and his wife died in March 2007.

== Legacy ==
The Nicklaus Children's Hospital Foundation established the Ambassador David M. Walters International Pediatric Hall of Fame in 1985. Walters himself was inducted in 2004.

Preceded by Henry Cabot Lodge Jr.	Personal Representative of the President to the Holy See; 1977–1978	Succeeded by Robert F. Wagner Jr.
