= Qom University of Medical Sciences =

Qom university of medical science
- دانشگاه علوم پزشکی قم
- Type: Public
- Established: 1996
- President: Dr Ali Ebrazeh
- Academic staff: 300
- Students: About 3400
- Location: Qom, Qom province, Iran
- Campus: Urban
- Colors
- Website: https://en.muq.ac.ir/
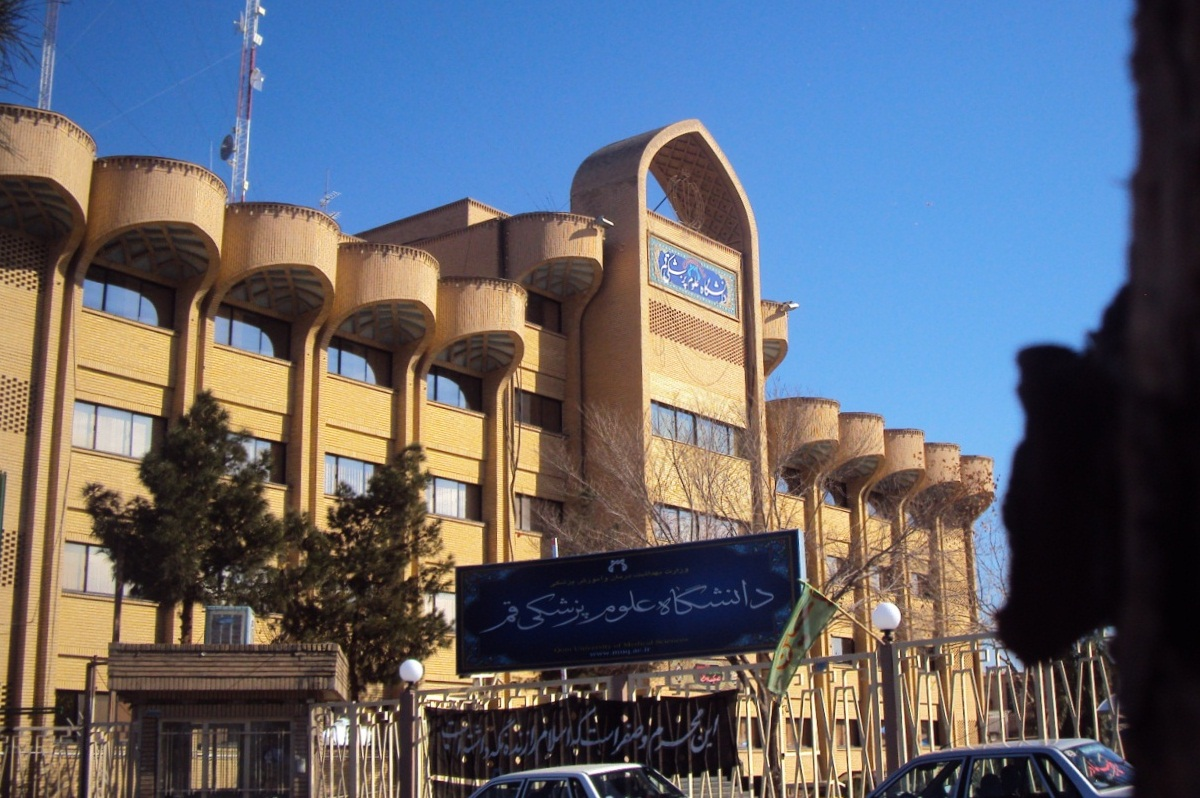

Qom University of Medical Sciences (MUQ) is a public medical university located in Qom Province, Iran. It was established in 1996 as the Qom Faculty of Medical Sciences and later upgraded to university status in 2005. The university provides medical education and healthcare services across the province.

MUQ is organized into seven schools, including the Faculties of Medicine, Dentistry, and Nursing, offering 39 academic programs spanning undergraduate, graduate, residency, and doctoral studies. As of 2025, the university enrolls about 3,400 students and employs nearly 300 faculty members. MUQ operates seven teaching hospitals (including Kamkar-Arabnia and Shahid Beheshti hospitals) alongside six research centers that support education, clinical training, and research.

The university's research output is tracked by the Nature Index. It is included in several international university rankings, such as the Times Higher Education World University Rankings, the SCImago Institutions Rankings, and the Webometrics Ranking of World Universities. In 2025, seven faculty members from MUQ were listed among the world’s top 2% scientists.

MUQ publishes several peer-reviewed academic journals, including Health, Spirituality and Medical Ethics, which is indexed in the Directory of Open Access Journals (DOAJ) and follows the publication ethics guidelines of the Committee on Publication Ethics (COPE).

== History ==
Qom University of Medical Sciences was founded in 1996 as the Qom Faculty of Medical Sciences and Health Services, following the creation of Qom Province that same year. The new faculty was tasked with overseeing medical education, healthcare administration, and public health services in the province. It admitted its first students - a cohort of nursing undergraduates - in October 1997.

In its early years, the Ministry of Health and Medical Education approved the establishment of faculties of nursing and public health, and the Environmental Health Program was launched in 1999. By 2000, six hospitals in the province had been designated as teaching hospitals, providing clinical training facilities. Medical training began with the admission of the first cohort of medical students in 2004.

The expansion of teaching, research, and healthcare services led the Ministry to upgrade the institution to full university status in 2005, renaming it Qom University of Medical Sciences. Further faculties were established, including the Faculty of Dentistry in 2011 and the Faculty of Health and Religion, created to link health sciences with ethics, spirituality, and religious studies.

== Campus ==
The university's principal academic facilities are distributed across several sites in Qom. Its main campus is the Shahid Ghazi Campus, which contains the educational buildings, administrative offices, lecture halls, and student dormitories.

The university's seven faculties are located across these sites and include teaching laboratories, simulation facilities, and libraries supporting undergraduate and postgraduate education.

Research activities are carried out through six research centers. The Comprehensive Research Laboratory, established in 2022, provides shared biomedical and clinical research facilities, while the Innovation and Growth Center supports technology transfer and startup development.

Clinical education is conducted through the university's network of seven affiliated teaching hospitals, which serve as the primary training sites for medical students, residents, and fellows.

== Research ==
Qom University of Medical Sciences conducts research in biomedical sciences, clinical medicine, public health, and interdisciplinary health sciences through its affiliated research centers. As of 2025, the university operates six research centers under the Vice-Chancellor for Research and Technology, together with the Comprehensive Research Laboratory.

Established in 2022, the Comprehensive Research Laboratory provides shared facilities and advanced scientific equipment for research in basic medical sciences, biotechnology, molecular biology, clinical medicine, and related disciplines.

The university also operates an Innovation and Growth Center that promotes technology transfer, supports research commercialization, and assists the development of knowledge-based companies in the health sector.

The university's research output is tracked by the Nature Index and the institution is included in international rankings such as the SCImago Institutions Rankings.

In 2025, seven faculty members were listed among the world's top 2% most-cited scientists in the annual Stanford University–Elsevier ranking, which is based on standardized citation indicators derived from the Scopus database.

== Rankings and reputation ==
Qom University of Medical Sciences is included in the Times Higher Education (THE) World University Rankings. The ranking evaluates universities based on indicators including teaching, research environment, research quality, industry engagement, and international outlook.

=== Global rankings ===
In the Times Higher Education World University Rankings, Qom University of Medical Sciences has been ranked in the following ranges:

Year	World University Rankings
2023	401–500
2024	801–1000
2025	1201–1500
2026	1501+

In the 2026 edition of the Times Higher Education World University Rankings, the university received the following scores across the main performance indicators:

- Teaching: 35.8
- Research Environment: 11.5
- Research Quality: 34.7
- Industry: 24.6
- International Outlook: 25.8

=== Subject rankings ===
In the Times Higher Education subject rankings for Medical and Health, Qom University of Medical Sciences has been ranked in the following ranges:

Year	Medical and Health Ranking
2023	201–250
2024	601–800
2025	801–1000
2026	1001+

In the 2026 Times Higher Education Medical and Health ranking, the university's scores were:

- Teaching: 19.0
- Research Environment: 8.4
- Research Quality: 33.4
- Industry: 24.6
- International Outlook: 26.6

== The organization structure ==
The organizational structure of the university, ratified by The Iranian Management and Planning Organization, is:

- Dean of the university, along with
- Seven Vice-deans:
  - Vice-dean for Research and technology,
  - Vice-dean for Education,
  - Vice-dean for Culture & Student Affairs,
  - Vice-dean for Health Care,
  - Vice-dean for drug and Food,
  - Vice-dean for Public Health,
  - Vice-dean for Resource and Management Development.

The heads of faculties are chosen by the Dean, and operate the faculties in association with the office of Vice-dean for Education. The heads of teaching hospitals are also chosen and assigned from faculty members and by the Dean.

== Hospitals ==
- Kamkar
- Khayerin Salamat
- Hazrat masoome
- Shahid beheshti
- Shohada

== Schools ==
- School of medicine
- School of dentistry
- School of public health
- School of Nursing & Midwifery
- School of Paramedical

== See also ==
- University of Medical Science
