= Forest siege =

Cuban Military Siege

The Forest Siege or J-4 Operation, also called Bayonetas Contra Estudiantes, was a Cuban Military Siege or Cuban Military Operation on three Pakistani medical schools in Cuba in early 2010. The purpose was to expel some of infamous (word used by Cuban official) students involved in protests against administration and school authorities. The siege was a type of raid during which a large number of Cuban special force armed men who surrounded the school of J-4. Two additional schools, namely AG-7 and T-9, were also surrounded by Cuban forces.

At least 15 students named by authorities were captured, arrested and immediately deported to their home country. The siege is called the Forest Siege because these schools were located in an area of a planted forest of oranges and a few other varieties of citrus fruit, far from the main city of Matanzas located on the northern shore of the island of Cuba.

== Schools Under Siege ==
Following were the school under operation by Tropas Antimotines Cubanas.

Máximo Santiago Haza -J4

Antonio Ramon Horta AG7

Jose Maria Agurrie T9

== Location of Schools ==
These three schools were located in a small municipality called Jagüey Grande in the city of Matanzas (Matanza, a Province of Cuba). The municipality is located east of the Zapata Peninsula, north of the Bahia de Cochinos, along the Carretera Central, in the middle of the province.

== See also ==
- Education in Cuba
