= José María Aguirre =

Cuban revolutionary

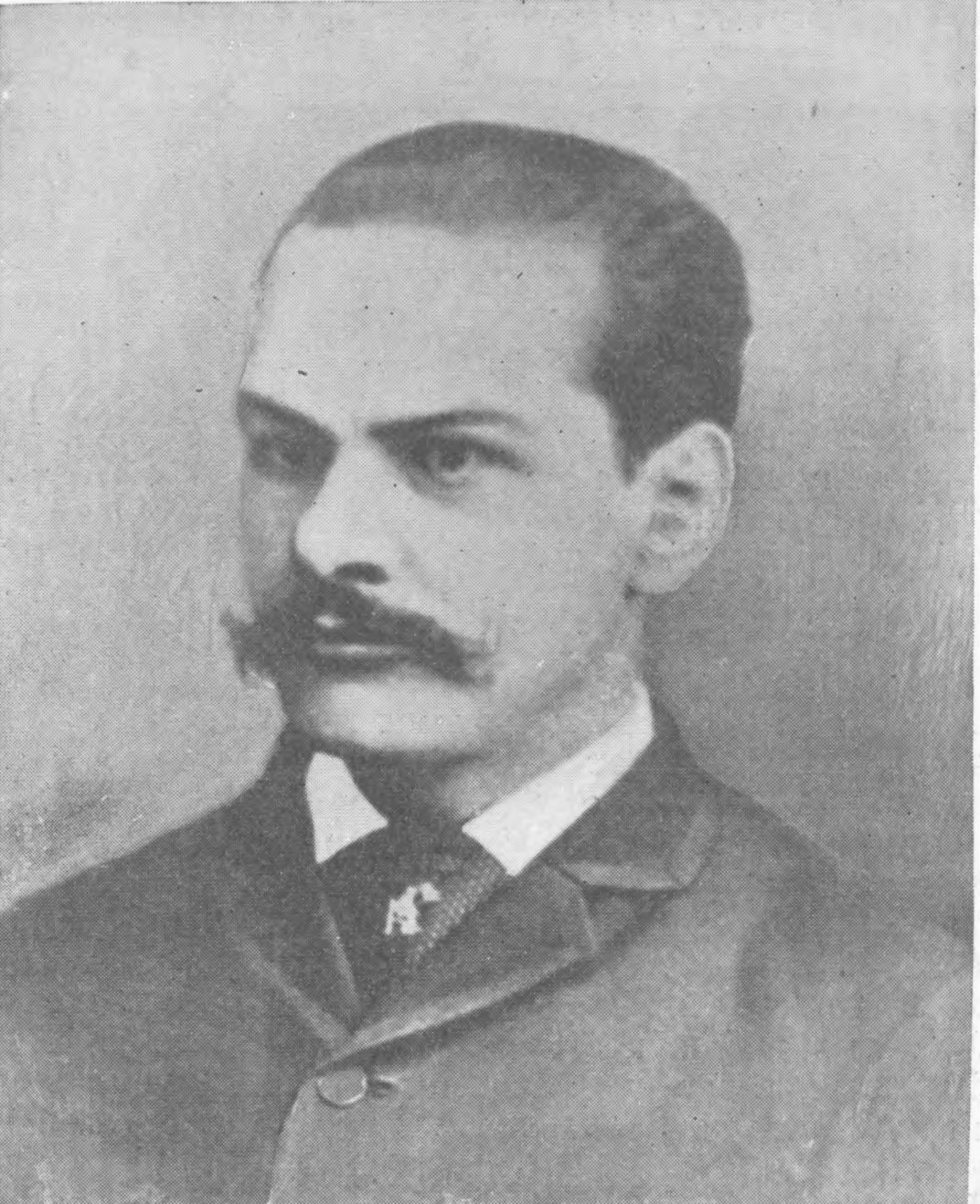

Major General José María Aguirre (died in Jaruco, 1896) was a Cuban soldier in the Cuban War of Independence (1895–1898), the final of three liberation wars Cuba waged against Spain. He was associated with Enrique Collazo and was connected with the newspaper Protesta. After being wounded in 1896, he succumbed to pneumonia in the lomas of Jaruco. The José María Aguirre T9 medical school is named in his honour.
