= Torbat Heydarieh University of Medical Sciences =

- دانشگاه علوم پزشکی و خدمات بهداشتی درمانی تربت حیدریه
- Established: 1993
- Chancellor: Dr. Hossein Ebrahimipour
- Students: 800
- Location: Torbat Heydarieh, Iran
- Website: thums.ac.ir

Torbat Heydarieh University of Medical Sciences is a medical sciences university in Torbat Heydarieh, Razavi Khorasan, Iran. The university has three school including health, para-medicine, and nursing & midwifery.
