= University of Medical Sciences, Cienfuegos =

- Type: Public university
- Established: 1 September 1979
- Dean: Raymond S. Greenberg, MD, PhD
- Location: Cienfuegos, Cienfuegos Province, Cuba; 22.14583°N 80.43639°W
- Website: Official Website

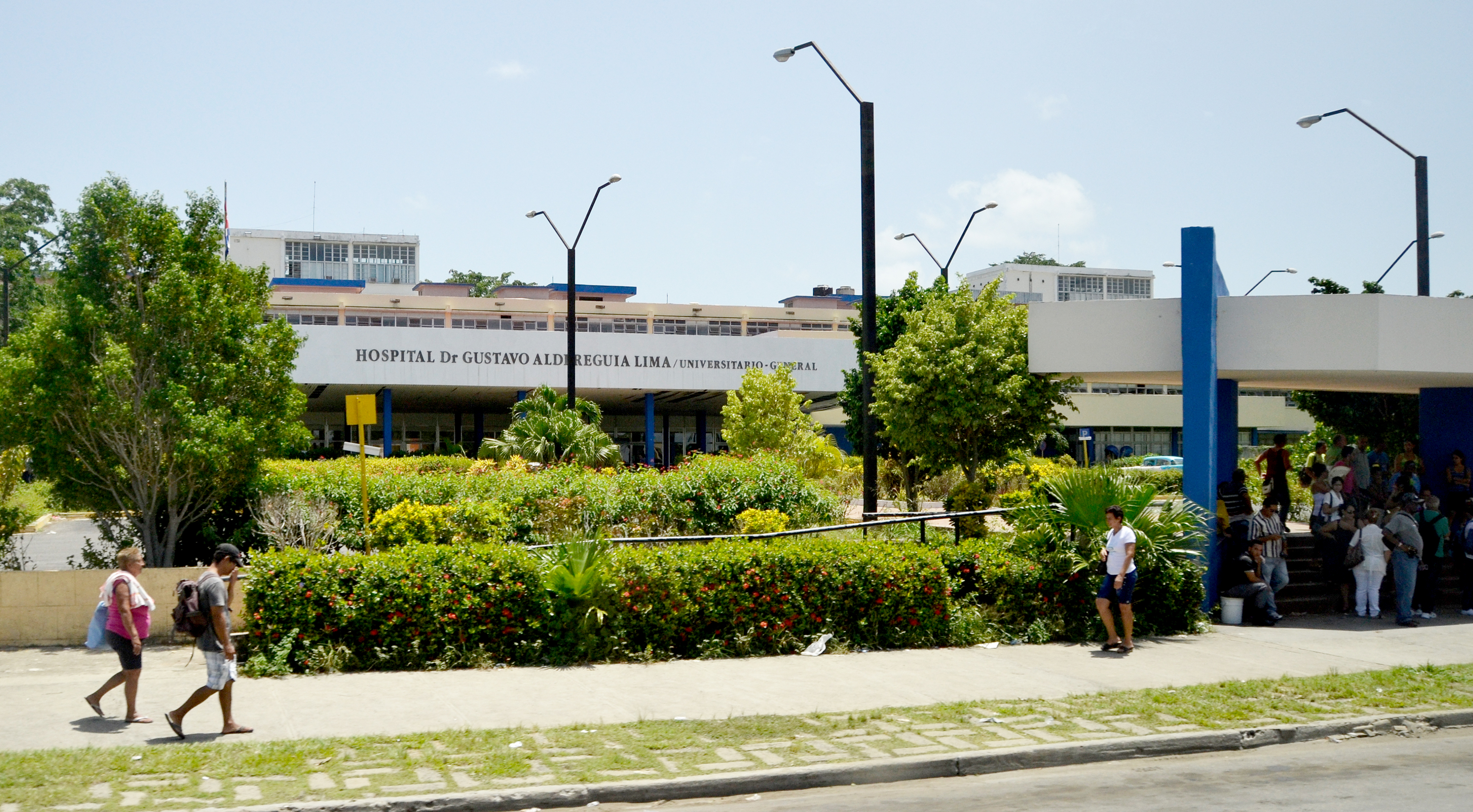
The Hospital "Dr. Gustavo Aldereguía Lima" in Cienfuegos

The University of Medical Sciences, Cienfuegos (also Medicine School of Cienfuegos: Dr. Raúl Dorticós Torrado) was established in 1979 in Cienfuegos, Cuba. Provincial General Hospital "Dr. Gustavo Aldereguía Lima" is affiliated to the university. Currently, students from 52 countries are registered in different departments.
