= Jagüey Grande =

Jagüey Grande Jagüey
- Municipality
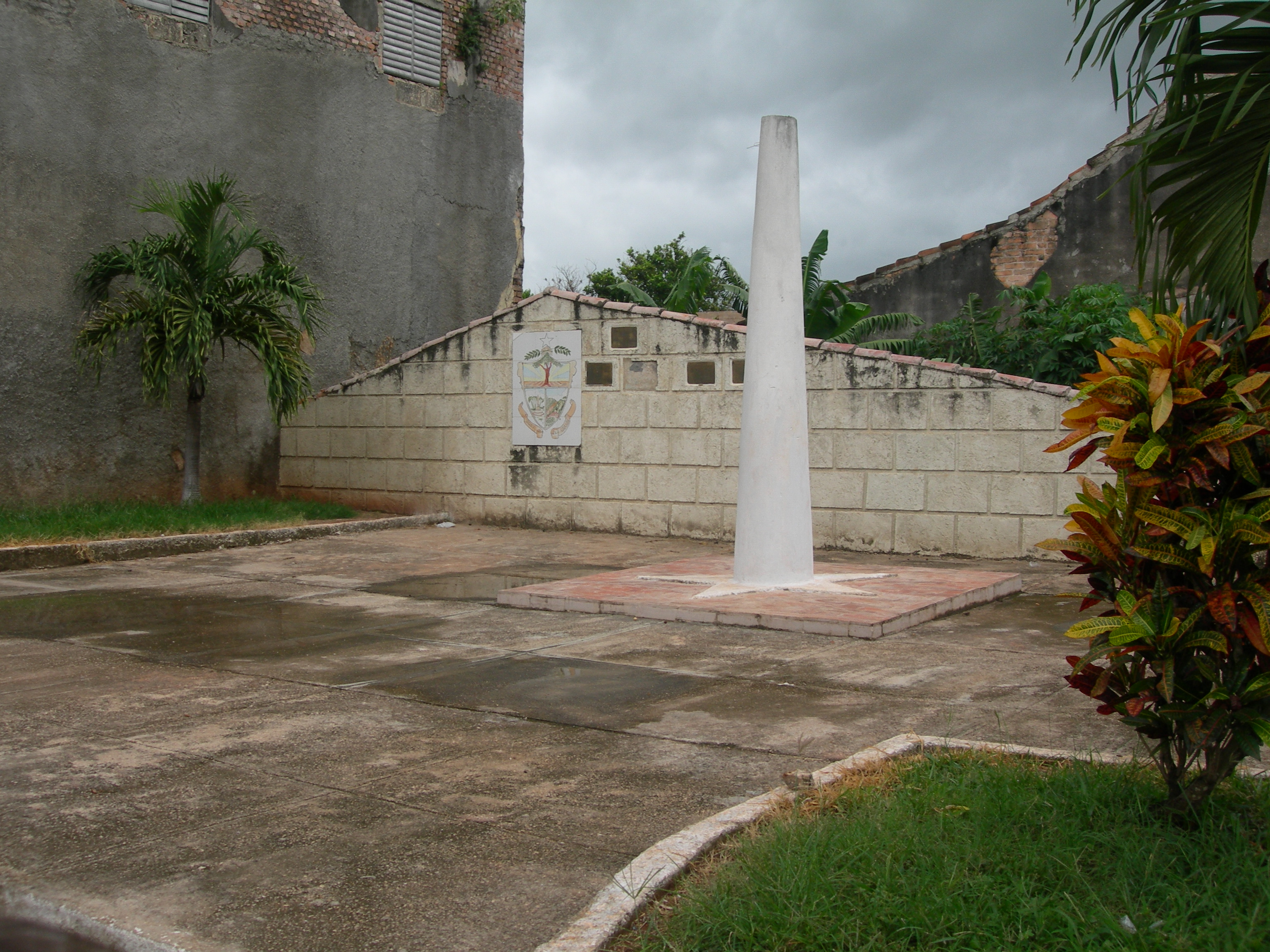
- Libertadores Square

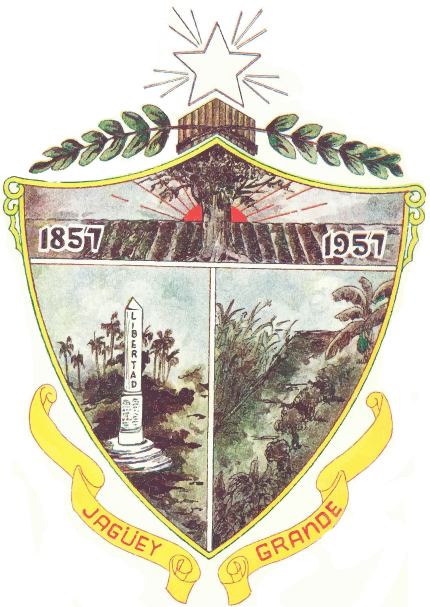
- Flag Seal

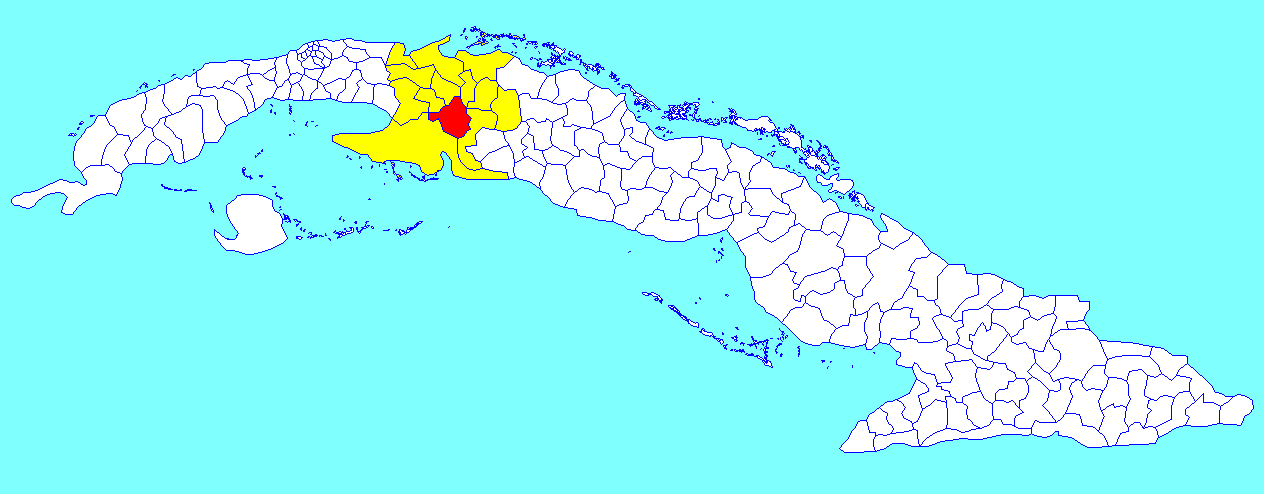
- Jagüey Grande municipality (red) within Matanzas Province (yellow) and Cuba
- Coordinates: 22°31′45″N 81°07′57″W
- Country: Cuba
- Province: Matanzas
- Founded: 1762

Area
  - Total: 882 km^{2} (341 sq mi)
- Elevation: 135 m (443 ft)

Population (2022)
  - Total: 59,600
  - Density: 67.6/km^{2} (175/sq mi)
- Time zone: UTC-5 (EST)
- Area code: +53-52

Jagüey Grande, simply known as Jagüey (Spanish pronunciation: [xaˈɣwej]), is a town and municipality in the Matanzas Province of Cuba. It is located east of the Zapata Peninsula, north of the Bahia de Cochinos, along the A1 motorway in the center of the province.

== History ==
The town was founded in 1840 and was named after the tree Ficus citrifolia, locally named "Jagüey".

== Geography ==
The municipality was historically divided into the barrios of Pueblo (town's centre), Gallardo, López, Murga Sinú, and Rovira. Nowadays it counts the town itself and the popular councils (consejos populares, i.e. villages) of Agramonte, Australia, San José de Marcos, and Torriente. Agramonte, the most populated village, was an autonomous municipality until the 1976 reform.

== Demographics ==
In 2022, the municipality of Jagüey Grande had a population of 59,600. With a total area of 882 km^{2} (341 sq mi), it has a population density of 65.5/km^{2} (170/sq mi).

== Notable people ==
- Mario García Menocal (1866–1941), politician, 3rd President

of Cuba

- Jaime Lucas Ortega y Alamino (1936–2019), archbishop
- Leopoldo Fernández (Tres Patines) (1904–1985), actor and comedian
- Lorenzo García Vega (1926–2012), writer and poet

== See also ==
- Forest siege (2010)
- Municipalities of Cuba
- List of cities in Cuba
