= Nova Southeastern University College of Medical Sciences =

The Nova Southeastern University College of Medical Sciences is part of the Health Professions Division of Nova Southeastern University. It offers a two-year program of study leading to a master's degree in biomedical sciences. The Master of Biomedical Sciences degree program is accredited by the Southern Association of Colleges and Schools (SACS).
