= Highway 4–112 (Cuba) =

Cuban north-south highway

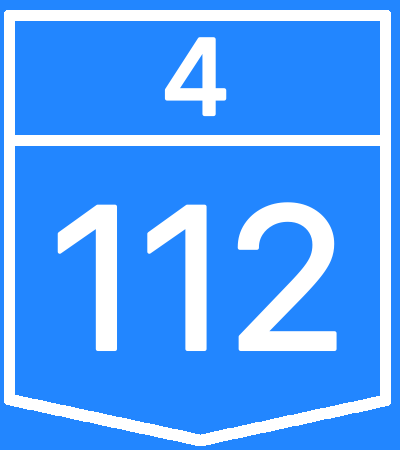
Carretera Esperanza-Cienfuegos
- Esperanza-Cienfuegos Road
- 4–112
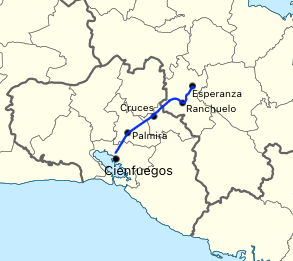
- Road in blue from Esperanza to Cienfuegos

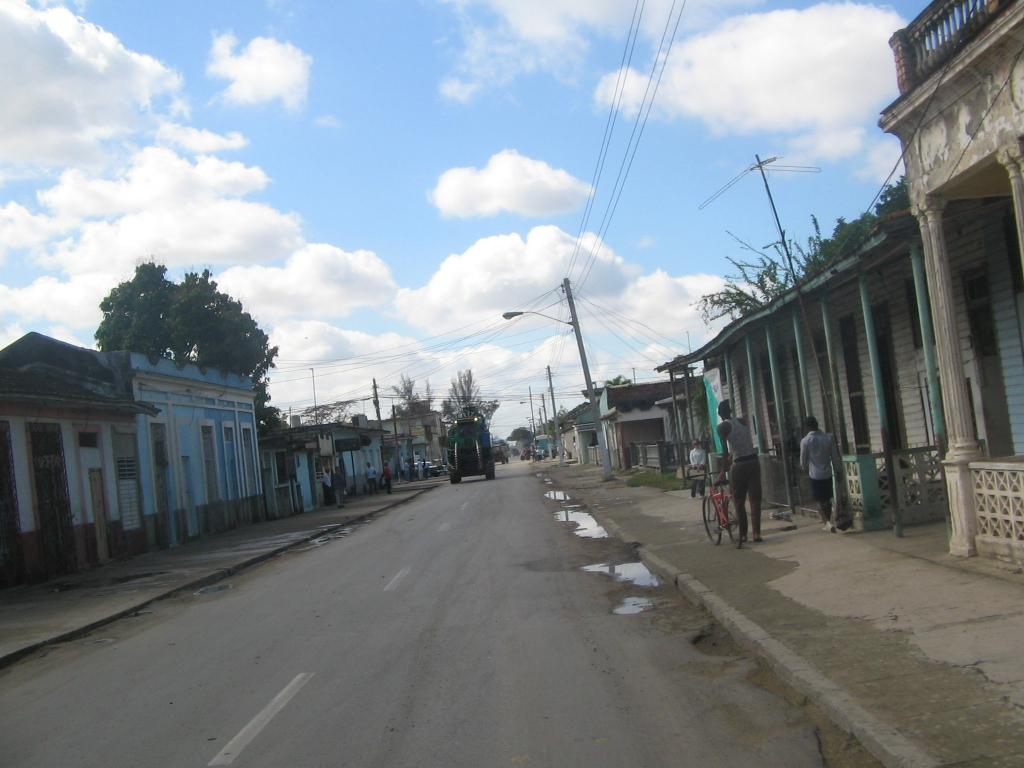
- 4–112 in Cruces

Route information
- Length: 53 km (33 mi)

Major junctions
- North end: 4–N–1 (Carretera Central) in Esperanza
- A1 (Autopista Nacional) near Ranchuelo
- South end: 4–I–2 (Circuito Sur) in Cienfuegos

Location
- Country: Cuba
- Provinces: Villa Clara, Cienfuegos
- Municipalities: Ranchuelo, Cruces, Palmira, Cienfuegos

Highway system
- Roads in Cuba

Highway 4-112, also known as the Villa Clara-Cienfuegos Road, Esperanza-Cienfuegos Road, or simply the 112 is a Cuban north-south highway which links the village of Esperanza and the Carretera Central, with the Autopista A1 to the city of Cienfuegos and the Circuito Sur. The road is considered the interprovincial road of Cienfuegos Province, with it being the only road to directly connect it to the Carretera Central.

== History ==
The Camino Real of Cienfuegos – Santa Clara became the first road connecting the 2 cities, with the 4–112 being the same general, from Cienfuegos to Cruces to Villa Clara, route. The first part of the road on the Avienda 26 de julio was the former Camino Real, which turned into the 4–112, and then continues onto the former Camino a Ranchuelo.

== Route ==
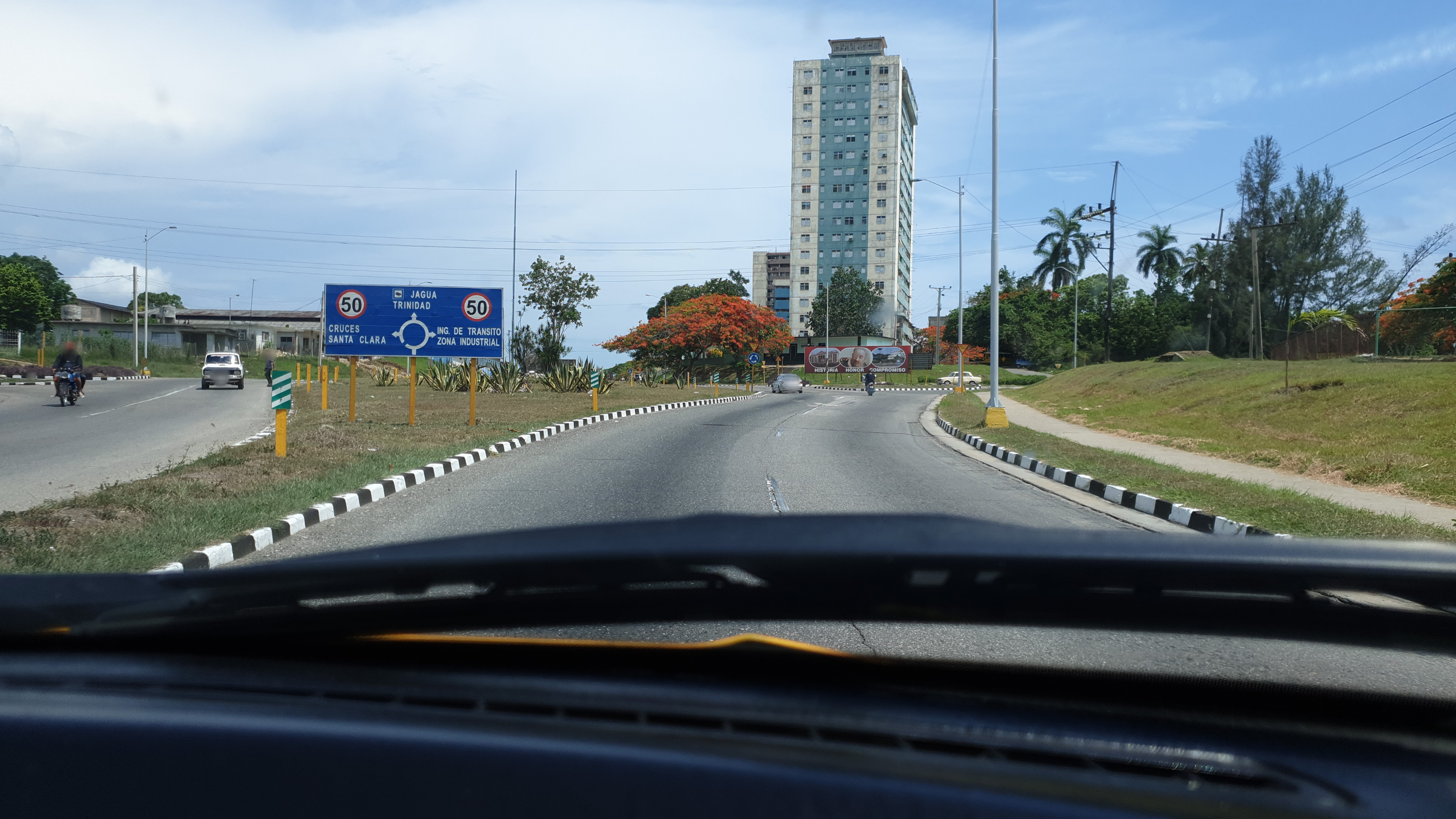
Entrance to the road coming from the Circuito Sur Roundabout, with it being marked as Cruces, Santa Clara

The 4-112 starts at the Carretera Central in Esperanza, nearby provincial capital, Santa Clara. It continues south, going over the Autopista Nacional, to Ranchuelo and Carlos Caraballo in Villa Clara Province. The road continues straight to the villages of Marta Abreu and Cruces in the municipality of Cruces, Espartaco and Palmira in the municipality of Palmira, and finally goes into the municipality of Cienfuegos and merges into the Circuito Sur (right) and Calle 37 (left).

The road is dangerous to drive on, especially at night, with it being known as “impassable and that section [Cruces area] even more so”, said a forum member after an accident happened in the Cruces area of the highway. At night, it’s common to find tractors, cars, and bicycles without any lights.

In 2014, as part of the repair and maintenance in Villa Clara Province, the 4–112 had hundreds of tons of asphalt poured on several areas with poor conditions, with corrections of potholes happening throughout the province.

== Junction list ==
Municipality	Location	km	mi	Destination	Notes
Ranchuelo	Esperanza	0	0	4–N–1 Carretera Central – Santa Clara	
Ranchuelo	Esperanza	0.92	0.57	Calle Barnada	one way
Ranchuelo	Esperanza	0.97	0.60	Calle Maceo	one way
Ranchuelo	Esperanza	1.21	0.75	Calle Villuendas	one way
Ranchuelo	Ranchuelo	9.11	5.66	A1 (Autopista Nacional) – Havana, Santa Clara	
Ranchuelo	Ranchuelo	10.51	6.53	Calle Leoncio Vidal (Carretera de San Juan) – La Campa, San Juan de los Yeras	
Ranchuelo	Ranchuelo	10.72	6.66	Calle Camilo Cienfuegos	
Ranchuelo	Ranchuelo	10.95	6.80	Avenida de los Martires	unpaved
Ranchuelo		13.09	8.13	Road to Virginia – Virginia	unpaved
Ranchuelo	El Tamarindo	14.29	8.88	Road to Pedroso – Pedroso	unpaved
Ranchuelo		15.23	9.46	Road to Tarapaca – Tarapaca	unpaved
Ranchuelo		16.11	10.01	Road to Ifraín Alfonso – Ifraín Alfonso, La Majagua, Horqueta	
Ranchuelo	Carlos Caraballo	19.87	12.35	Calle Batey Carlos Caraballo	
Cruces	Marta Abreu	22.33	13.88	4–92 (Carretera a Lajas) – Lajas, Cartagena	
Cruces	Cruces	25.45	15.81	Calle Calixto Garcia (Cruces–Potrerillo Road) – Potrerillo, Cumanayagua	
Cruces	Cruces	25.56	15.88	Calle Padre de las Casas	
Cruces		28.05	17.43	Road to Mal Tiempo – Mal Tiempo	
Cruces		28.29	17.58	4–182 (Calle Central Ramón Balboa)	
Cruces		29.08	18.07	Road to La Pedrera – La Pedrera	
Cruces	Paradero de Camarones	31.34	19.47	Road to Camarones – San Fernando de Camarones	
Cruces	Espartaco	36.33	22.57	Road to Espartaco Sugar Mill	
Palmira	Palmira	42.13	26.18	4–172 (Calle Cespedes / Carretera Caunao–Palmira) – Caunao	
Palmira	Palmira	42.44	26.37	Calle San Agustin (Road to Ciego Montero) – Arriete-Ciego Montero	
Palmira		45.92	28.53	Access to AZUMAT – AZUMAT factory	
Cienfuegos		49.78	30.93	Substation Road	
Cienfuegos	Cienfuegos	51.49	31.99	Calle 82	
Cienfuegos	Cienfuegos	51.78	32.17	Calle 37	
Cienfuegos	Cienfuegos	52.31	32.50	4–I–2 (Circuito Sur)	Road continues as Port Road
