= Arriete-Ciego Montero =

- Village
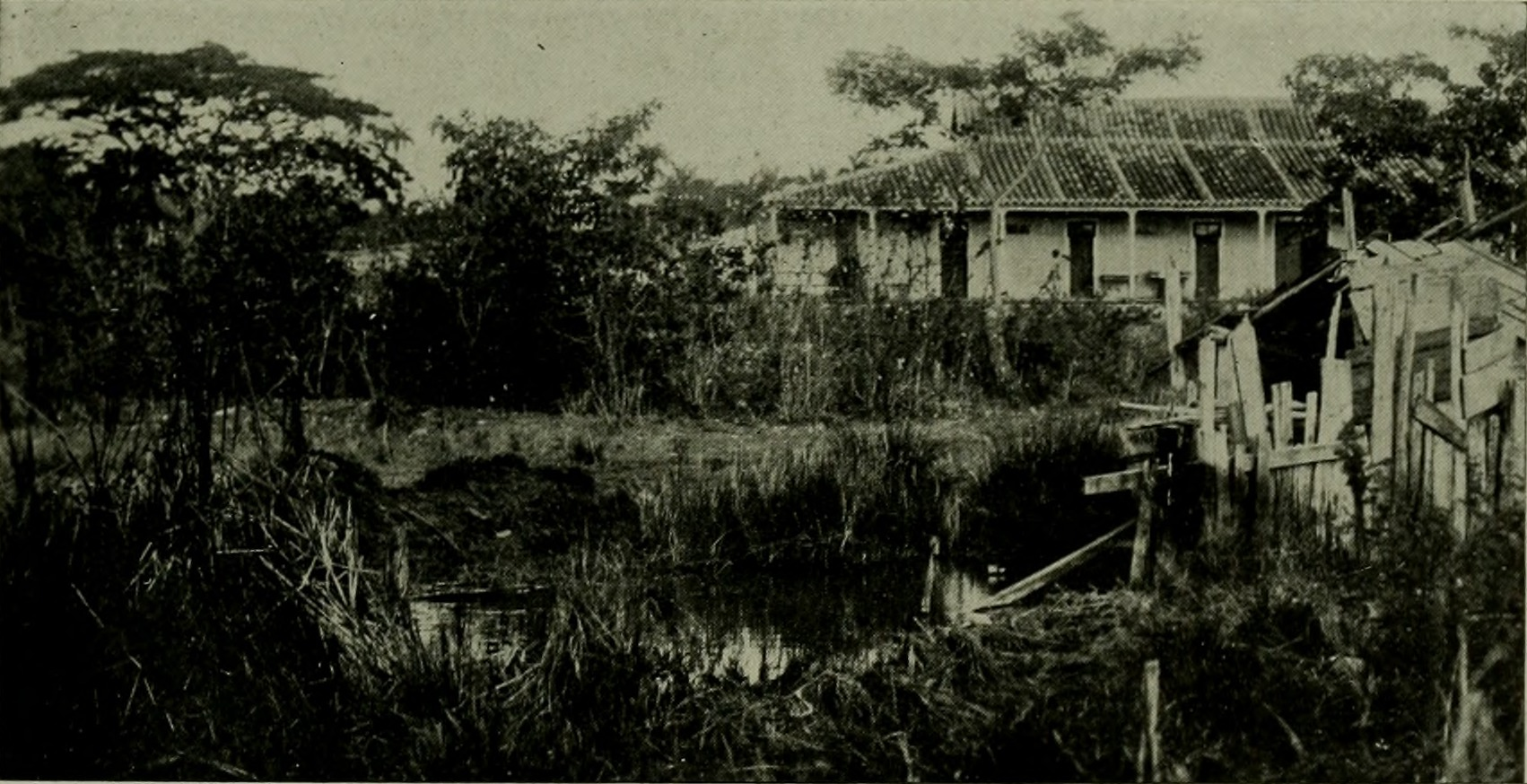
- The village in early 20th century (Photo of The American Museum Journal)

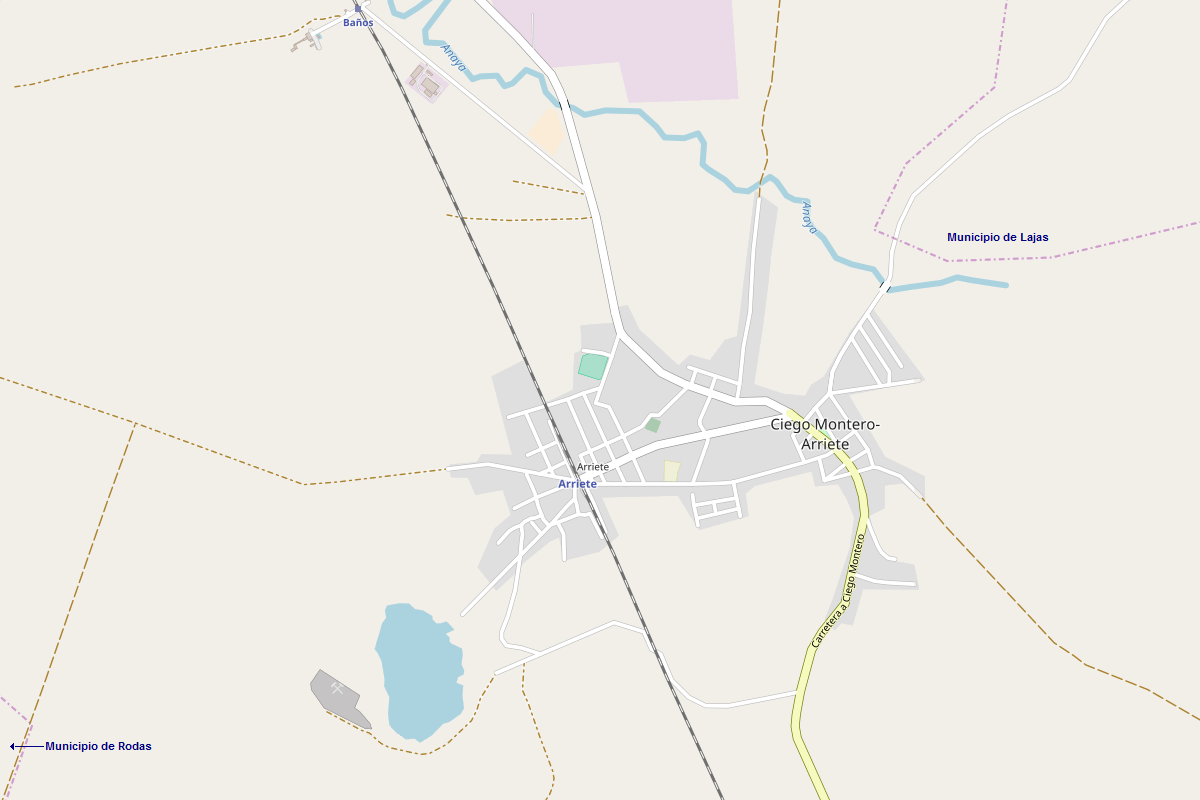
- OSM map showing Arriete-Ciego Montero and the surrounding area, including the baths (north)

- Location of Arriete-Ciego Montero in Cuba
- Coordinates: 22°20′22.6″N 80°24′43.2″W
- Country: Cuba
- Province: Cienfuegos
- Municipality: Palmira
- Founded: 1835
- Elevation: 60 m (200 ft)

Population (2011)
  - Total: 4,816
- Time zone: UTC-5 (EST)
- Area code: +53-43

Arriete-Ciego Montero, also known as Arriete or Ciego Montero, is a Cuban village, spa town, and consejo popular ("people's council", i.e. hamlet) of the municipality of Palmira, in Cienfuegos Province. In 2011 it had a population of 4,816.

== History ==
The foundation of the village, originally named only Ciego Montero, started in 1835, with the first perimeter demarcation around the local thermal waters. In 1862 was proposed to rename it "Principe Alfonso" after Alfonso XII of Spain, born 5 years before. The eastern quarter of Arriete, originally named Arrieta, was a detached village, united to Ciego Montero in 1977, after the Cuban administrative reform. Following that reform, the new united village of Arriete-Ciego Montero passed from the municipal administration of Rodas to the current one of Palmira.

== Geography ==
Located in the northern corner of its municipality, close to the municipal borders with Lajas (19 km east), and Rodas (27 km west), Arriete-Ciego Montero lies on a rural plain south of Anaya Creek's sources. The settlement spans around the two main quarters of Arriete (east), grew around the railway and next to a pond; and Ciego Montero (west), grew along a provincial road linking Cartagena (11 km north) to Palmira (11 km south).

The settlement includes the surrounding rural localities of Baños, La Rosita, Nuevo Amanecer and Tres Picos. Baños (Spanish for "baths"), also known as Balneario de Ciego Montero, lies 5 km north of village's center and is a spa resort.

Arriete-Ciego Montero is 9 km from Espartaco, 11 from Elpidio Gómez, 16 from Cruces, 22 from Camarones, 23 from Cienfuegos, 32 from Ranchuelo and 53 from Santa Clara.

== Economy ==
The village is a thermal water resort receptive for tourism. It is also famous for the bottled water plant named "Ciego Montero". As a brand, part of Nestlé and owned by the Cuban society Los Portales, the "Ciego Montero" produces water and soft drinks, as the Gaseosa or the tuKola.

== Transport ==
Arriete-Ciego Montero has a railway station on the Southern Line (Linea Sur) Havana-Güines-Aguada-Palmira-Cienfuegos. A secondary stop on the same line, named Baños or Balneario de Ciego Montero, serves the local spa resort. The village is crossed to the west by a provincial road named "Carretera a Ciego Montero", linking Cartagena to Palmira. This road connects Arriete to the A1 motorway exit of "Cartagena-Rodas" (14 km north), and to the state highway "4-112" Santa Clara-Cienfuegos (9 km south).

== See also ==
- List of spa towns
- Municipalities of Cuba
- List of cities in Cuba
