= Damují River =

River in Cuba

The Damují River is a Cuban river situated south of Los Toros, close to Punta Bélico. It is born in the Cienfuegos municipality of Lajas and flows west, ending in the bay of Cienfuegos. It covers the municipalities of Rodas, Palmira, Abreus and Cienfuegos. It is the largest and most important river on the southern slope of the country. It has several streams and smaller streams as tributaries. It has an estimated temperature of 24°C.

The main ships of the Cuban Navy are called Rio Damují class in honor of this river.

== See also ==
- List of rivers of Cuba
