= Teatro de los Elementos =

Teatro los Elementos is a Cuban theater company founded by José Oriol Gonzáles in 1990. The troupe is formed by approximately ten actors including José Oriol, who is the director. Although the company used to move around a lot, it is now located on a farm in the province of Cienfuegos, near the town of Cumanayagua. Los Elementos is a very human company that is committed and engaged in helping people and their community, a characteristic that is clearly reflected in their actions.

== History ==
When the theater company was founded in 1990, it was mainly composed of alumni of the Havana National Institute of Performing Arts. Throughout the years, the troupe’s productions have taken place in many different locations.

El Romerillo, which is considered one of Havana’s poorest neighbourhoods, was used as the location in their first production, Tres Brujas, una Compania y un Barrio con Nombre de Flor (Three Witches, a Company and a Neighbourhood Named for a Flower) in 1991. Their second production, Historias de Jacksonville (Stories of Jacksonville), took place in Jacksonville, now called Cocodrilo in 1992, in a community of fishermen on la Isla de la Juventud (Isle of Youth).

Another one of their early productions, Mackandal sauve o historias de la vida y la muerte de Mackandal (Mackandal sauve or stories of life and death of Mackandal), took place in the community of Barrancas in Santiago de Cuba in 1993, a community of Haitian immigrants. The company worked with a lot of children from poor, urban and rural neighborhoods teaching them about theater until 1995. They also worked with people living with HIV. While the troupe has had a history of moving, in 1995 they decided to settle down for in Cumanayagua where they established a caring and eco-friendly community. The location for this community was the farm that belonged to José Oriol’s grandparents. By settling down, it allowed the troupe to build an artistic community, where many artists – actors and writers – decided to live.

The community practices sustainable agriculture, animal husbandry and community based social programs, which are consistent with their beliefs and objectives of respecting the earth and improving their living conditions. José Oriol has recently announced that the troupe is now ready to move again.

== Members/Actors ==
The troupe is composed of 9 members :

- Aleorka Gutiérrez Hernández
- Elaisy Pérez Castillo
- Geidy González Mendoza
- Isnoel Yánez González
- Juan Bautista Castillo Pol
- Yanexy Román Hermida
- Yaima Chávez González
- Yoel Pérez Ruiz
- Yannit Pozo Castillo.

== Productions ==
- Tres brujas, una compañía y un barrio con nombre de flor (Three Witches, a Company and a Neighbourhood Named for a Flower) – 1991
- Historias de Jacksonville (Stories of Jacksonville) – 1992
- De cómo se funda un barrio (How to create a neighbourhood) – 1993
- Mackandal sauve ó historias de la vida y la muerte de Mackandal (Mackandal sauve or Stories of life and death of Mackandal) – 1993
- Pasacalles Uno – 1995
- La Historia de un Pueblo (The Story of a Town) – 1995
- Vivimos bajo el mismo cielo / Habitamos sobre la misma tierra (We live under the same sky / We live on the same planet) – 1995
- Pascalles – N.A.
- Acto del Aniversario del Plan Turquino Manatí – 2000-2001
- Performance. El Catalogo (Performance. The Catalogue) – 2004
- Cienfuegos, Patrimonio de la Humanidad (Cienfuegos, World Heritage) – 2005
- Espectáculo de Recibimiento a los Delegados del Festival Nacional de Telecentros (Welcoming Show for the Delegates of the National Festival of Telecentros) – 2006
- Espectáculo de Recibimiento al Evento Internacional PABLO FREIRE IN MEMORIAM (Welcoming Show at the International Event : Pablo Freire in Memoriam) – 2006
- Espectáculo Cultural de Clausura del Evento Internacional CUBASOLAR 2006 (Closing Cultural Show at the International Event : Cubasolar 2006) – 2006
- Bienal de Teatro en la Montaña (Theater Biennial in the Mountains) – 2006
- Congreso Internacional de Turismo y Naturaleza (TURNAT) (International Congress of Tourism and Nature) – 2007
- Festival Internacional de Música Popular Benny Moré (International Festival of Benny Moré Popular Music) – 2007
- Bienal de Oralidad Escénica – 2007
- Desire – 2008
