= Ciego =

Ciego is a Spanish word meaning "blind". It may refer to:

== Places ==
- Ciego de Ávila, a Cuban city, seat of the homonym province
- Ciego de Ávila Province, a Cuban province
- Arriete-Ciego Montero, a Cuban village in Cienfuegos Province

== Other ==
- Ciego Montero, a Cuban brand of bottled water
