= Rio Damuji-class frigate =

Class of frigates of the Cuban Navy

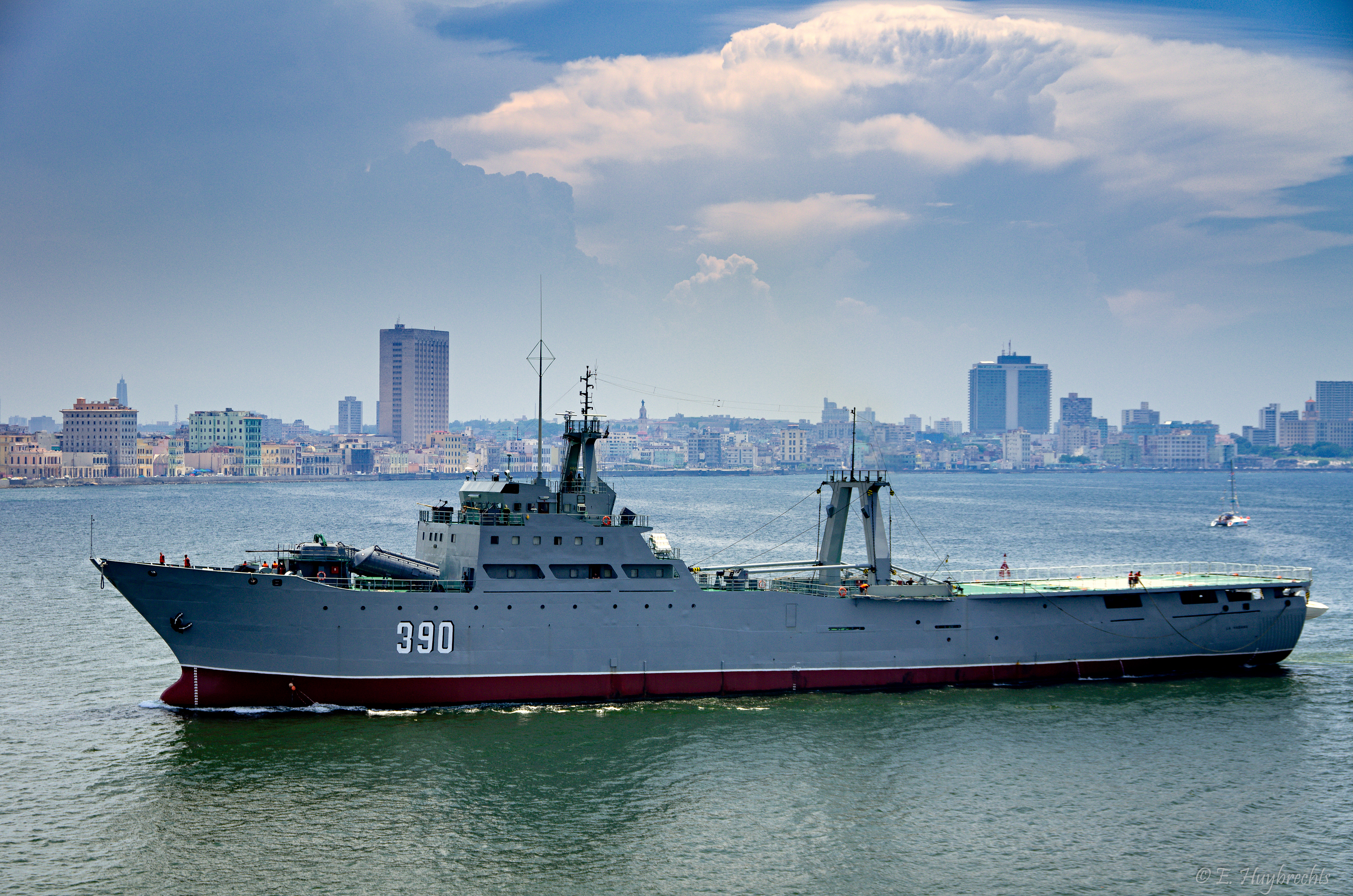
- Rio Damuji n° 390 in Havana in July 2011

Class overview
- Name: Rio Damuji class
- Builders: Astilleros Construcciones, Spain
- Operators: Cuban Revolutionary Navy
- Built: 1970s
- Active: 2

General characteristics
- Type: Converted Frigate
- Displacement: 3200 t
- Length: 106.86 m (350.6 ft)
- Beam: 14.61 m (47.9 ft)
- Draft: 5.63 m (18.5 ft)
- Propulsion: diesel
- Speed: 15 knots (28 km/h)
- Complement: 40
- Armament: 2 × Styx missile launchers; 2M-3 25mm twin 1NM AA/surface guns; 1 turret of a ZSU-57-2
- Aircraft carried: TBD - (likely Mil Mi-14 from naval aviation unit)
- Aviation facilities: landing area located in the aft area of the vessel

The Rio Damuji-class frigates are the largest warships in the Cuban Navy refitted from former Spanish-built fishing trawlers. Built between 1975 and 1979, they are variously classed as frigates, corvettes, or offshore patrol vessels. The ships' armament consists of Styx missile launchers, 25 mm guns, and the turret of a ZSU-57-2. Originally, three conversions were planned, the third ship being called Rio los Palacios, though likely only two were completed.

The class is named after the Damují River in Cienfuegos Province.

== Ships ==
Name	Pennant number	Builder	Laid down	Launched	Commissioned	Homeport	Status
Rio Damuji	BP-390	Astilleros Construcciones, Meira, Vigo, Spain		1972	1975 (as trawler for Flota Cubana de Pesca; 2007 (as frigate)	Havana	Active
Rio Jatibonico	BP-391	Astilleros Construcciones, Meira, Vigo, Spain		1977	1979 (as trawler); 2013 (as frigate)	Havana	Active
