= Esperanza (Ranchuelo) =

Esperanza La Esperanza
- Village
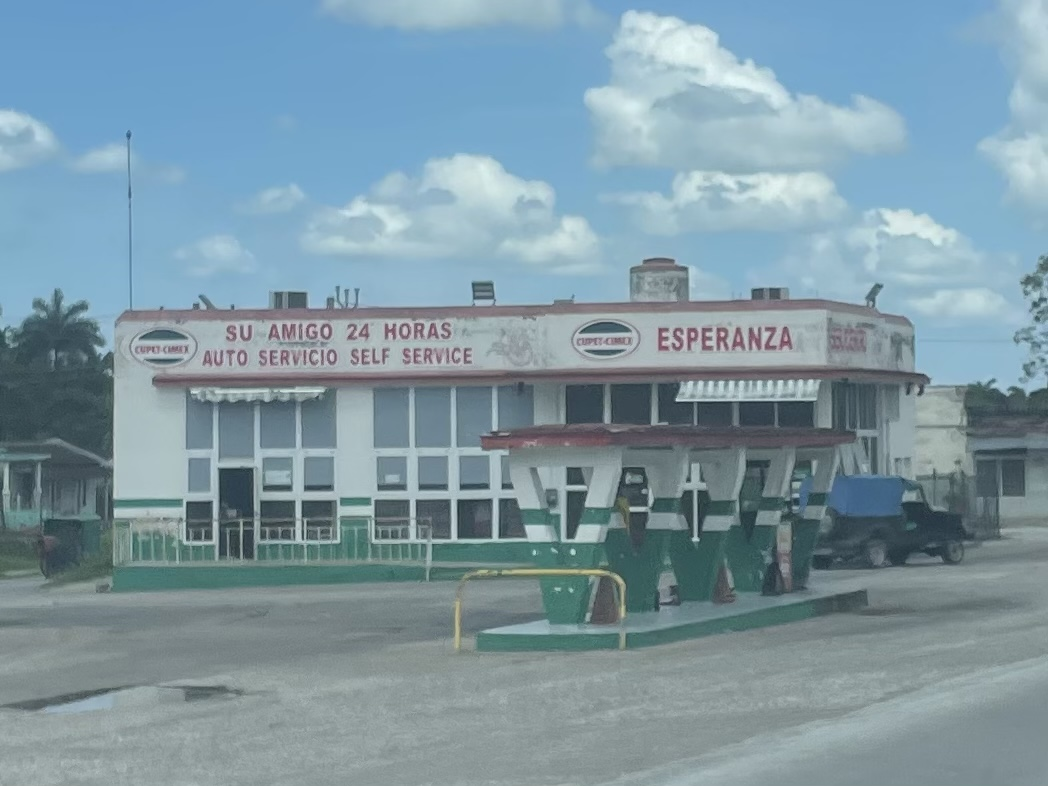
- gas station in Esperanza

- Coat of arms

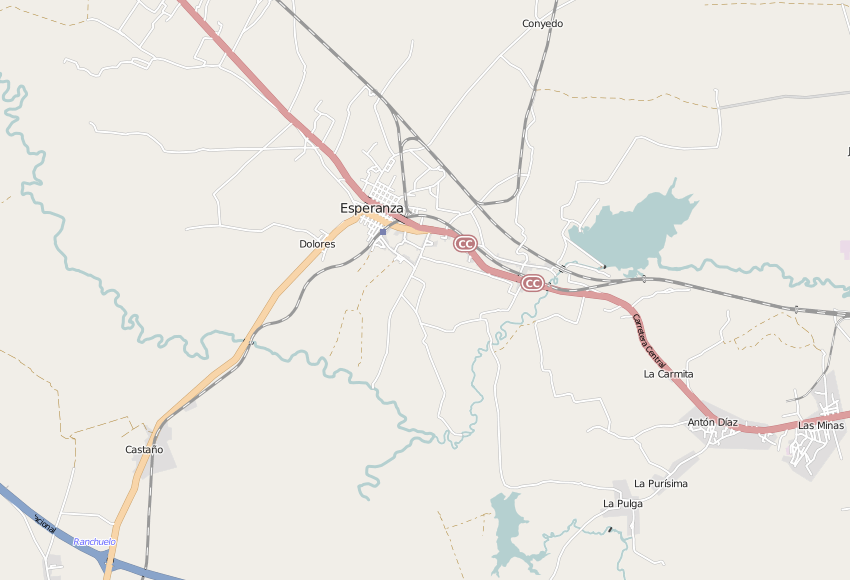
- OSM map showing Esperanza and its surrounding area. There are also shown some suburban villages of the city of Santa Clara and the A1 motorway exit of "Ranchuelo"

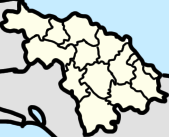
- Location of Esperanza in Cuba Esperanza (Villa Clara Province)
- Coordinates: 22°26′49.81″N 80°05′47.76″W
- Country: Cuba
- Province: Villa Clara
- Municipality: Ranchuelo
- Founded: 1809
- Elevation: 70 m (230 ft)

Population (2012-09-14)
  - Total: 11,147
- Time zone: UTC-5 (EST)
- Area code: +53-422

Esperanza (Spanish for "Hope"), also known as La Esperanza, is a Cuban village and consejo popular ("people's council", i.e. hamlet) of the municipality of Ranchuelo, in Villa Clara Province. It is the most populated municipal settlement after Ranchuelo, with it having a population of 11,147 as of 2012.

== History ==
Founded in 1809 and originally named Puerta de Golpe (i.e. "Slamming Door"), Esperanza is a former municipality merged in Ranchuelo after the administrative re-adjustment of 1976. The old municipality had a total population of 20,759 in 1943, and occupied the northern part of the current municipio of Ranchuelo with an area of 319 km^{2}. It included the villages of Asiento Viejo, Jabonillar, Nuevas, Purial, San José and San Vicente.

In 1933, a group of marxist workers called the Urbano de La Rosa, uprised as part of the Cuban Revolution of 1933, with it causing strong repressions on the municipality and several arrests.

== Geography ==
Esperanza is located on a plain surrounded by isolated hills and a lake, and its urban plan is developed with square shape. It lies 12 km in the west of Santa Clara and circa 8 in north of Ranchuelo. The village is 26 km far from Santo Domingo and 65 from Cienfuegos.

== Transport ==
Esperanza is crossed in the middle by the Carretera Central, the Cuban west–east highway, and is the northern end of the State Highway 4-112, from Cienfuegos. This road links the village to the A1 motorway (Autopista Nacional), at the exit "Ranchuelo-Cienfuegos", located 7 km in the south. Esperanza counts also a railway station in the junction point between the lines Havana-Santa Clara-Camagüey-Santiago and Santa Clara-Cienfuegos.

== See also ==
- Municipalities of Cuba
- List of cities in Cuba
