= La Unión, Cienfuegos =

La Unión
- Village
- Location of La Unión in Cuba
- Coordinates: 22°16′59.16″N 80°29′16.08″W
- Country: Cuba
- Province: Cienfuegos
- Municipality: Rodas
- Elevation: 57 m (187 ft)
- Time zone: UTC-5 (EST)
- Area code: +53-432

La Unión is a Cuban village in Cienfuegos Province. It is part of the municipality of Rodas.

== Geography ==
The little village is located between the nearby villages Limones and Ariza, crossed by the state highway "Circuito Sur". It is 10 km (6.2 mi) from Rodas and 16 km (9.9 mi) from Cienfuegos.
