= Rodas =

Rodas Rose
- Municipality
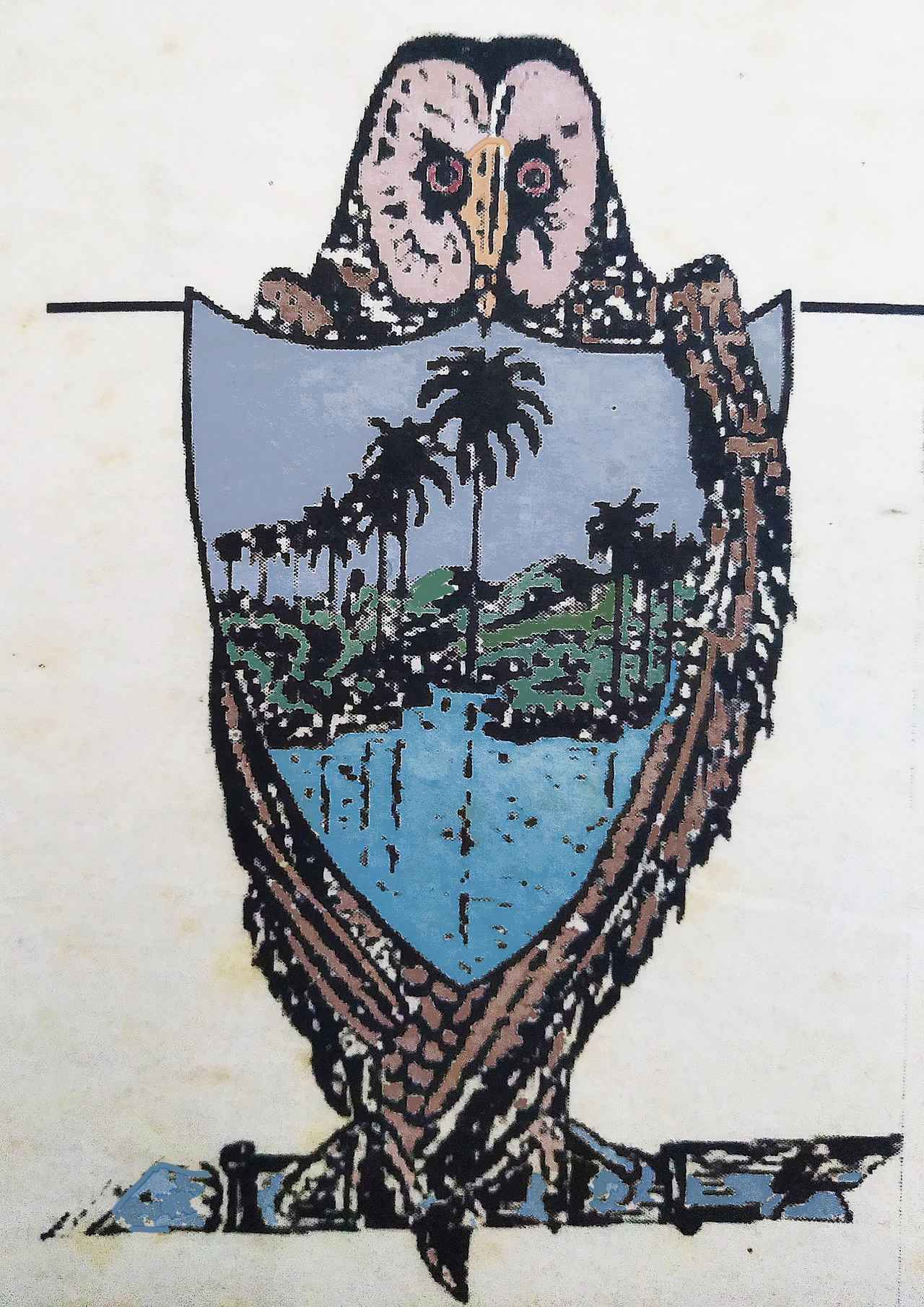
- Seal

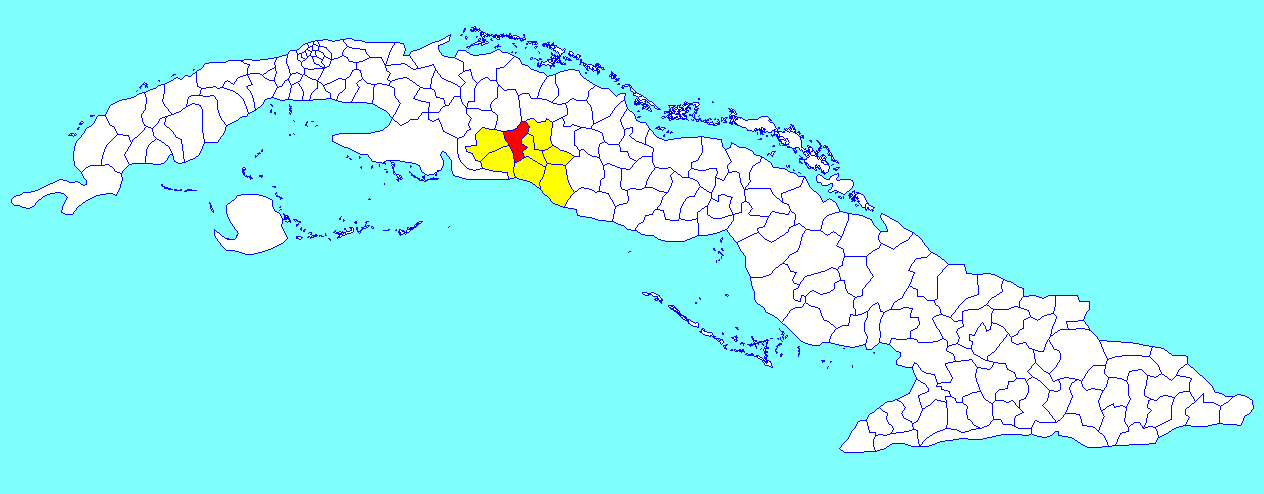
- Rodas municipality (red) within Cienfuegos Province (yellow) and Cuba
- Coordinates: 22°20′34″N 80°33′19″W
- Country: Cuba
- Province: Cienfuegos
- Founded: 1859

Area
  - Total: 552 km^{2} (213 sq mi)
- Elevation: 25 m (82 ft)

Population (2022)
  - Total: 32,719
  - Density: 59.3/km^{2} (154/sq mi)
- Time zone: UTC-5 (EST)
- Area code: +53-432

Rodas (Spanish pronunciation: [ˈroðas]) is a municipality and town in the Cienfuegos Province of Cuba. It was founded in 1859 under the name of Lechuzo. In 1879 it was renamed Rodas in honour of capitán general Caballero de Rodas.

== Geography ==
The municipality is divided into the barrios and villages of Cabecera (the town proper), Ariza, Cartagena, Congojas, Jabacoa, La Unión, Limones, Medidas, Santiago, Soledad and Turquino. Until the 1977 administrative reform, the village of Arriete-Ciego Montero, currently in the municipality of Palmira, was part of it.

It is bordered by the municipalities of Aguada de Pasajeros, Abreus, Cienfuegos, Palmira, Lajas, Santo Domingo (in Villa Clara Province) and Los Arabos (in Matanzas Province).

== Demographics ==
In 2022, the municipality of Rodas had a population of 32,719. With a total area of 552 km^{2} (213 sq mi), it has a population density of 59/km^{2} (150/sq mi).

== See also ==
- Municipalities of Cuba
- List of cities in Cuba
