= María Dámasa Jova Baró =

María Dámasa Jova Baró (December 11, 1890 – February 11, 1940) was a Cuban writer, educator and feminist.

== Biography ==
The daughter of Feliciano Jova and María del Socorro Baró, she was born María Dámasa Jova in Ranchuelo; her father died when she was less than two years old and she moved with her mother to Cienfuegos. Jova Baró trained as a primary school teacher.

Jova Baró was the first Afro-Cuban woman to own a printing press; she began publishing the children's magazine Ninfas in January 1929. She also produced a children's radio program "La Hora Teatral Ninfas" and established a literary and artistic club for children. Jova Baró was also founder and editor-in-chief for the literary and critical publication Umbrales Revista Literaria Artistica from 1934 to 1937.

In 1925, she published a collection of poetry Arpegios intimos.

Jova Baró participated in the provincial women's organization Club Femenino and raised concerns about the marginalization of Afro-Cuban women at the 1939 Congreso Nacional Femenino in Havana.

In 1939, she joined the Conjunto Nacional Democrático party and was chosen as that party's regional candidate for the national assembly; however, the provincial electoral board disallowed her candidacy.

She died in Santa Clara at the age of 49.

The city of Santa Clara named a primary school in her honour.
