= Palmira, Cuba =

Palmira
- Municipality
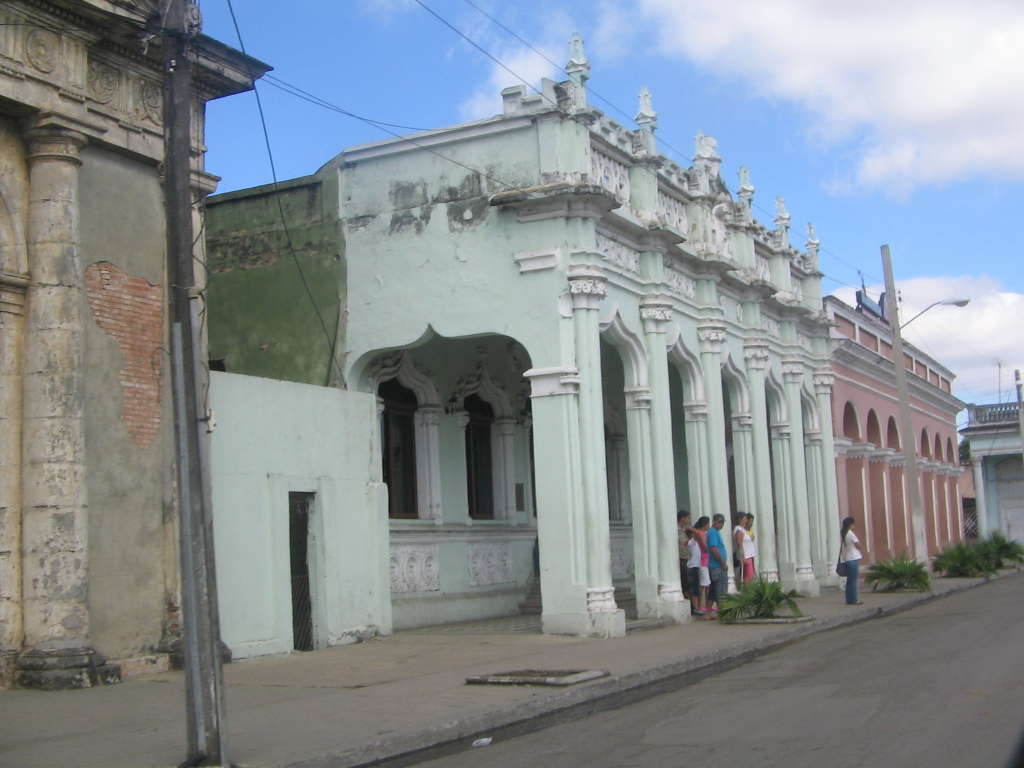
- Arcades in the central square

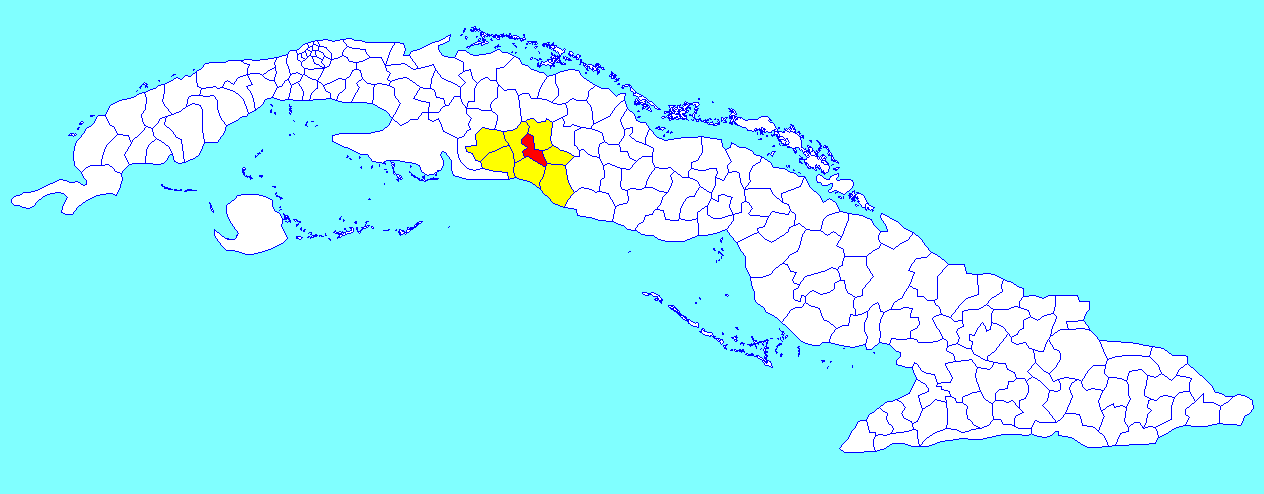
- Palmira municipality (red) within Cienfuegos Province (yellow) and Cuba
- Coordinates: 22°14′40″N 80°23′40″W
- Country: Cuba
- Province: Cienfuegos
- Founded: 1879
- Incorporated: 1940

Area
  - Total: 318 km^{2} (123 sq mi)
- Elevation: 60 m (200 ft)

Population (2022)
  - Total: 31,813
  - Density: 100/km^{2} (259/sq mi)
- Time zone: UTC-5 (EST)
- Area code: +53-43
- Website: https://palmira.gob.cu/

Palmira is a municipality and town in the Cienfuegos Province of Cuba. The whole municipality has 31,813 inhabitants.

== History ==
It was founded in 1879 under the name Las Casas. The name was changed to Palmira and the community was incorporated in 1940.

== Geography ==
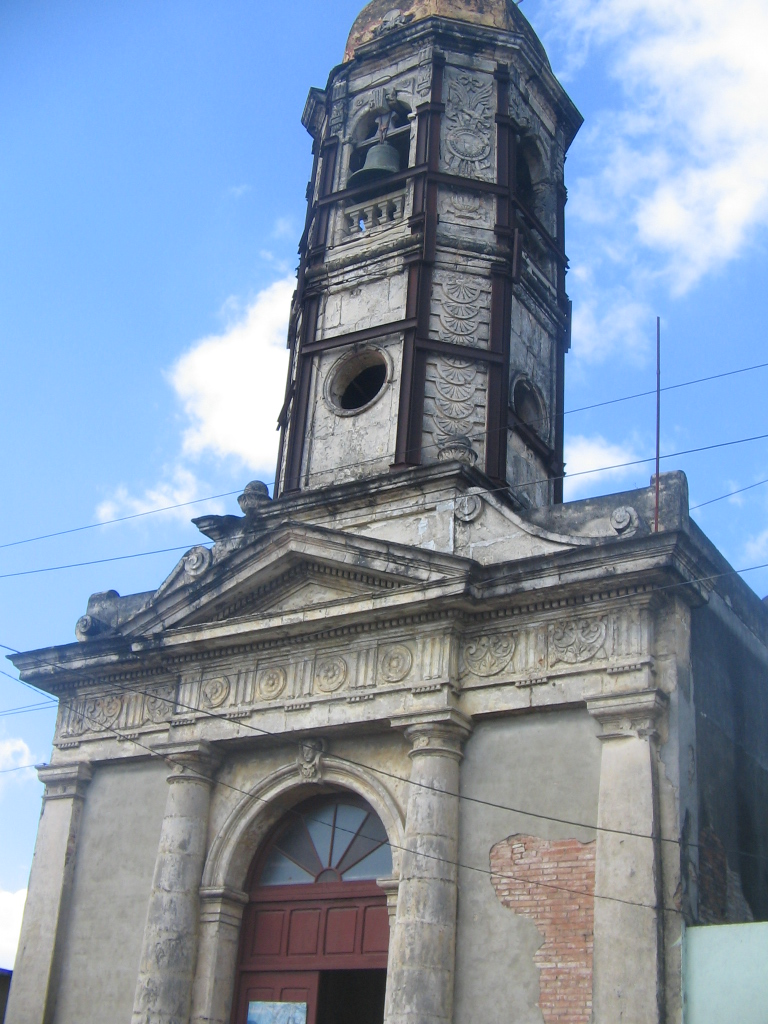
Town's church

Located in the middle of its province, Palmira is 12 km far from Cienfuegos, 16 from Cruces, and 52 from Santa Clara. It is bordered by the municipalities of Rodas, Lajas, Cruces, Cumanayagua and Cienfuegos.

In 1943 the municipality was divided into the barrios of Primero, Segundo, Arango y Escarza.

The thermal water resort of Arriete-Ciego Montero, 12 km (7.5 mi) form the town of Palmira, is also famous for the bottled water plant named "Ciego Montero".

== Demographics ==
In 2022, the municipality of Palmira had a population of 31,813. With a total area of 318 km^{2} (123 sq mi), it has a population density of 104.3/km^{2} (270/sq mi).

== See also ==
- Municipalities of Cuba
- List of cities in Cuba
