= Ranchuelo =

- Municipality
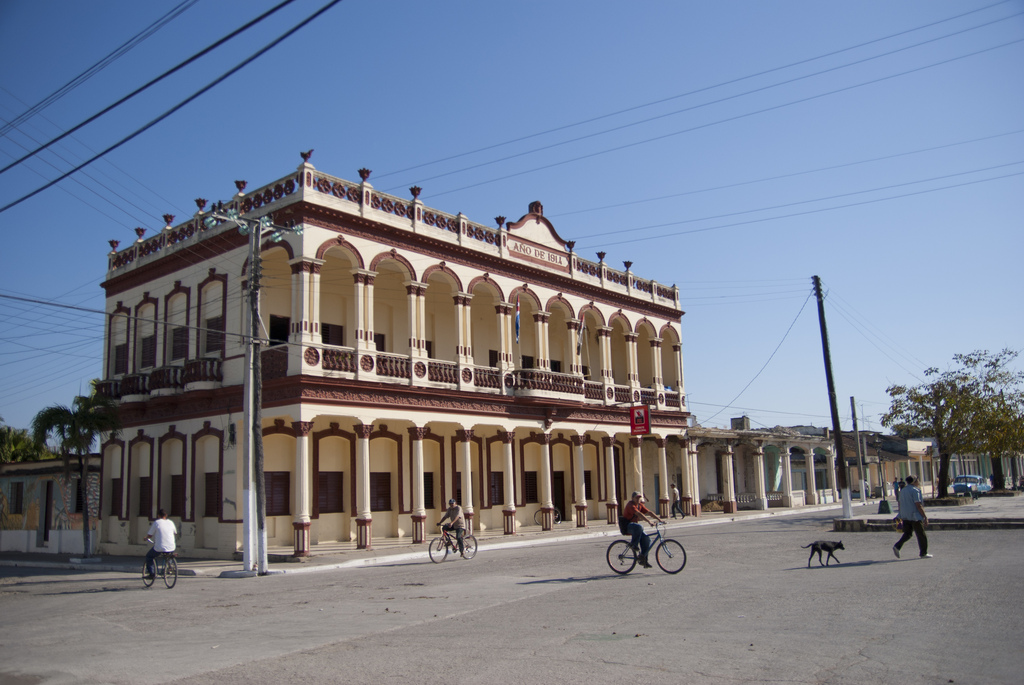
- Town hall

- Flag Coat of arms

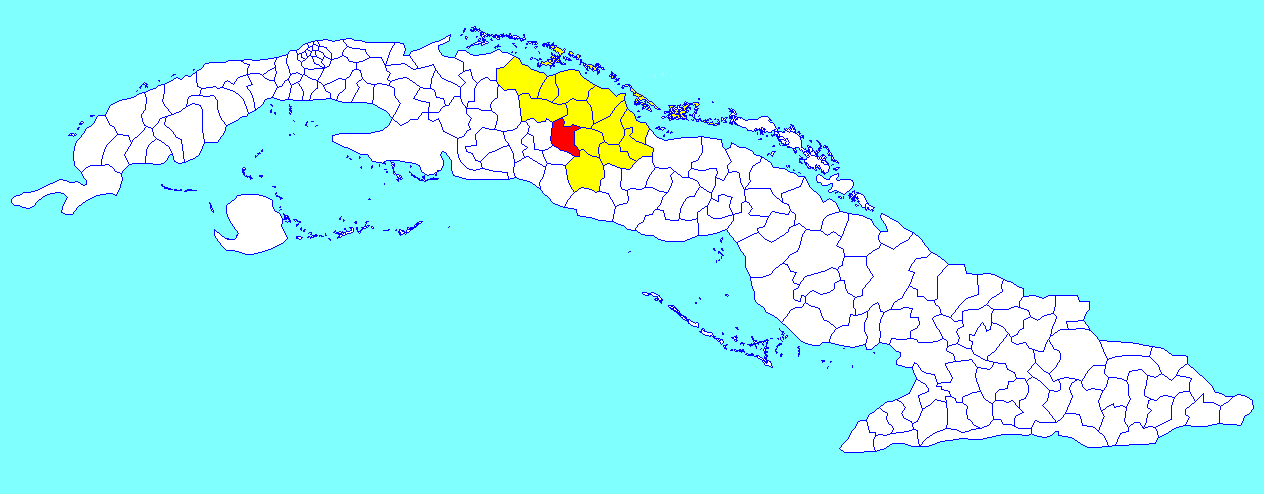
- Ranchuelo municipality (red) within Villa Clara Province (yellow) and Cuba
- Coordinates: 22°22′35.2″N 80°09′03.6″W
- Country: Cuba
- Province: Villa Clara
- Founded: 1734
- Established: 1879 (Municipality)

Area
  - Total: 556 km^{2} (215 sq mi)
- Elevation: 125 m (410 ft)

Population (2022)
  - Total: 50,708
  - Density: 91.2/km^{2} (236/sq mi)
- Time zone: UTC-5 (EST)
- Area code: +53-422

Ranchuelo is a town and municipality in the Villa Clara Province of Cuba. It was founded in 1734 and has a municipal population of 50,708, of which about 15,000 in the town itself.

== History ==
Originally named Boca de Ranchuelo, the settlement was founded by Dionisio Consuegra on October 1, 1734. In 1856 it was linked to the national rail network, and in 1879 gained the municipal status.

== Geography ==
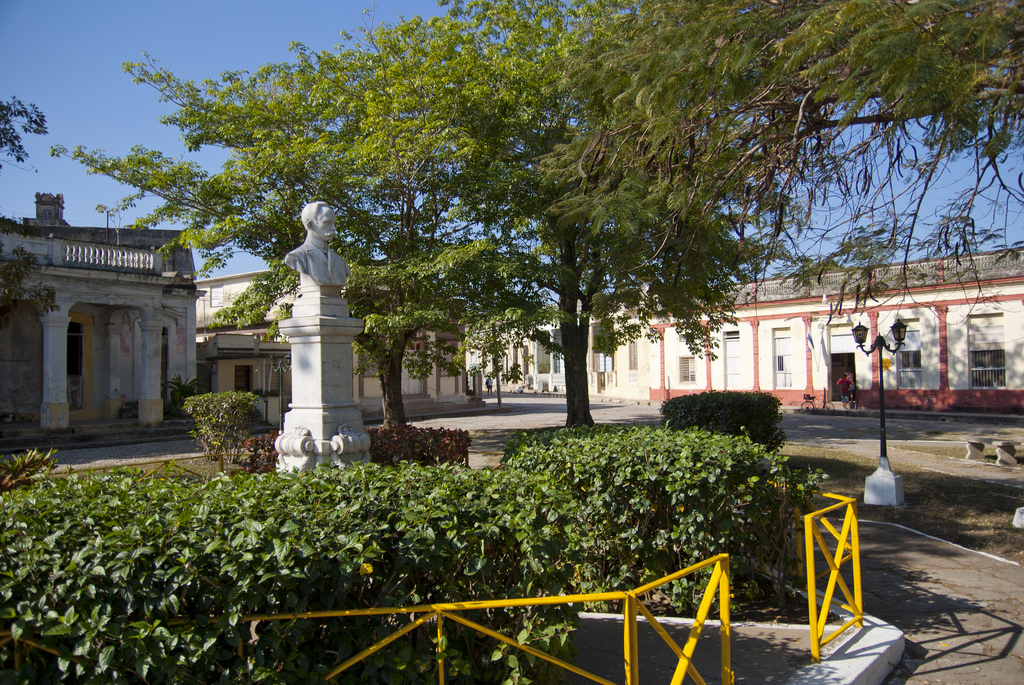
José Martí Square

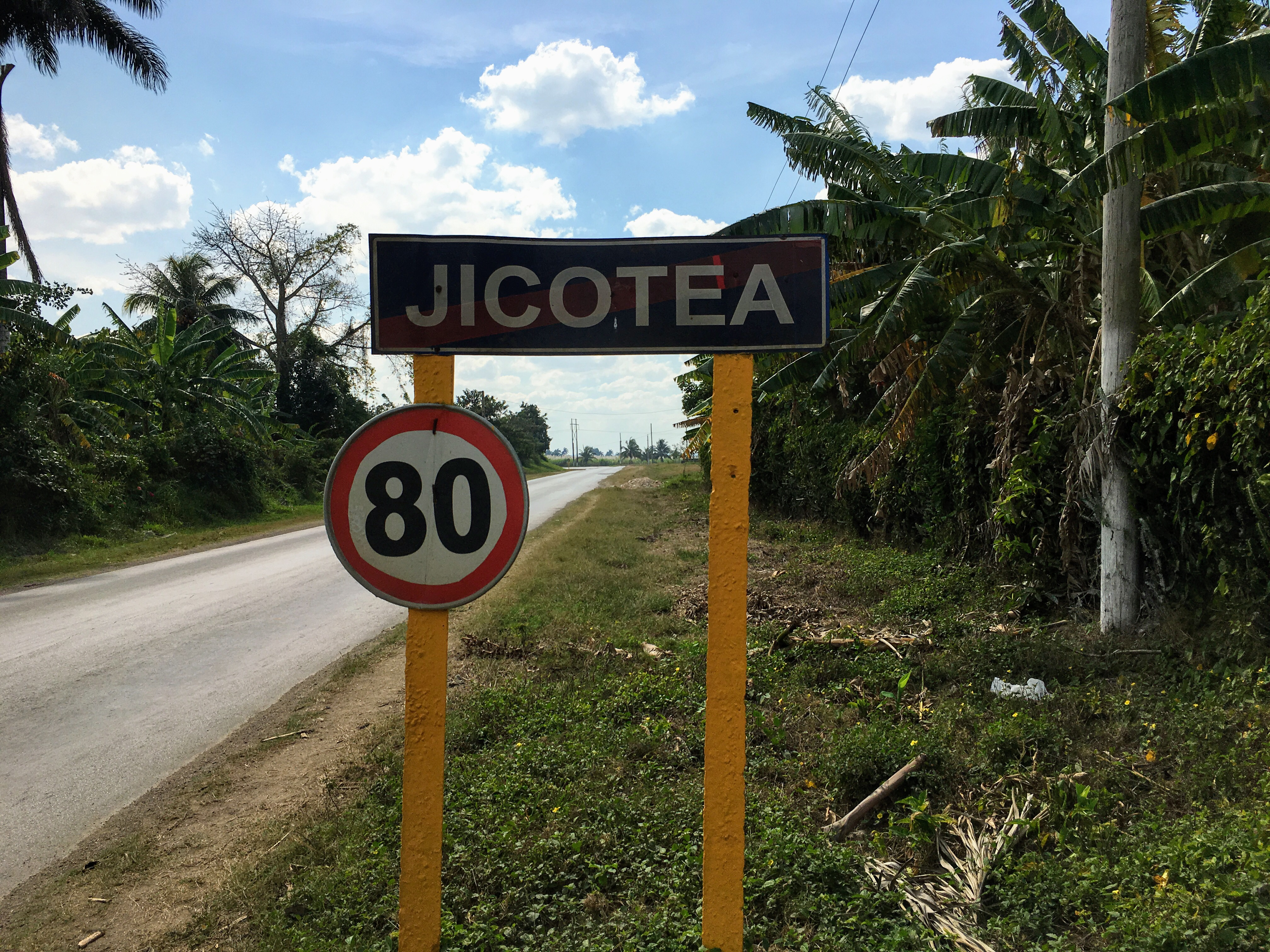
Jicotea sign leading into the village on the Carretera Central del Cuba highway.

The town is divided into the barrios of Norte, Poza de la China, Sitio Viejo and Sur.

Ranchuelo is 7 km from San Juan de los Yeras, 9 from Esperanza, 16 from Cruces, 28 from Santa Clara, 43 from Cienfuegos and 256 from Havana. It borders with the municipalities of Santo Domingo, Cifuentes, Santa Clara, Manicaragua, Cruces and Lajas.

== Demographics ==
In 2022, the municipality of Ranchuelo had a population of 50,708. With a total area of 556 km^{2} (215 sq mi), it has a population density of 106.2/km^{2} (275/sq mi).

== Transport ==
Ranchuelo is served by the A1 motorway at the homonym exit, also known as "Ranchuelo-Cienfuegos". It counts a railway station on the Santa Clara-Cienfuegos line, that is also the western terminus of a freight line to Mataguá.

Esperanza, the most populated municipal hamlet, is crossed in the middle by the "Carretera Central" state highway.

== Notable people ==
- Samuel Feijóo (1914-1992), singer, born in San Juan de los Yeras
- María Dámasa Jova Baró (1890-1940), writer, educator and feminist

== See also ==
- Municipalities of Cuba
- List of cities in Cuba
