= TuKola =

Cuban cola brand

tuKola
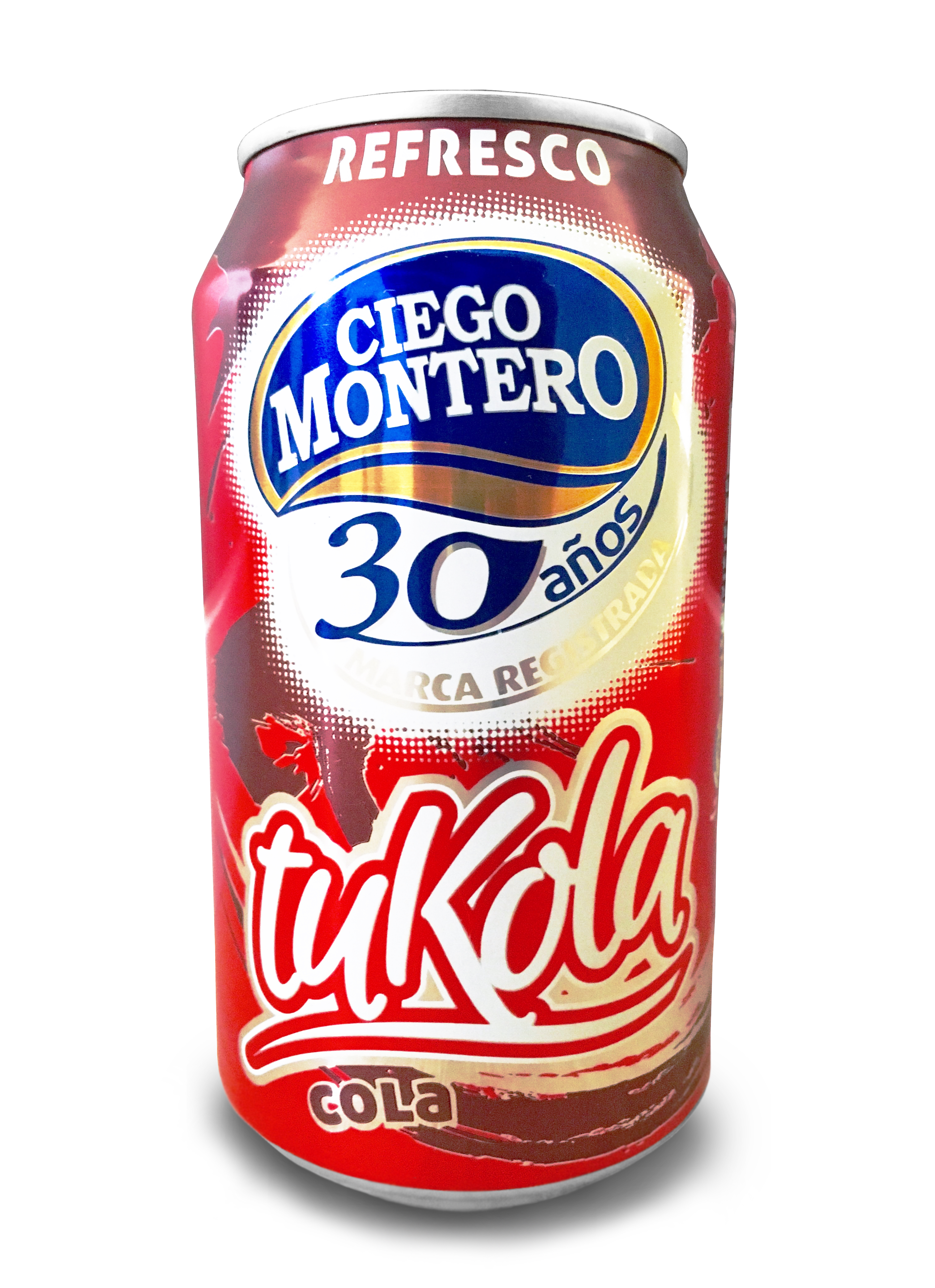
- tuKola can
- Type: Soft drink
- Manufacturer: Los Portales SA
- Distributor: Ciego Montero
- Origin: Cuba
- Introduced: 1980s (1985 under the Ciego Montero trademark)
- Color: Caramel color e-950
- Flavor: Cola
- Variants: tuKola Light (tuKola Dietética)
- Related products: Refresco Naranja (Orange Soda), Refresco Gaseosa (Lime Soda), Refresco Piñita (Pineapple Soda), Refresco Mate, Agua Tónica (Soda Water)
- Website: Los Portales: products

tuKola (Spanish pronunciation: [tuˈko.la]) is a cola brand produced and marketed in Cuba by Los Portales S.A., a joint venture with Nestlé Group.

== Product lines ==
tuKola was produced at Los Portales' facility in Guane, Pinar del Río Province, until the 1980s. Production was then taken over by Empresa de Bebidas y Licores de Pinar del Río.

The cola is sold in 355 ml cans, 330 ml bottles, and 1.5 litre plastic bottles.

== Culture ==
The success of tuKola in Cuba can be attributed to Coca-Cola's withdrawal from Cuba in 1962, leaving a gap in the market.

Notable people, such as the American chef Andrew Zimmern, have praised the taste of tuKola.

== Awards ==
- 2002 Expocaribe Award – tuKola Dietética
- 2001 XIX Fihav Award – tuKola Dietética

== See also ==
- Soft drink
- OpenCola
- Ciego Montero
