= Cumanayagua =

- Municipality
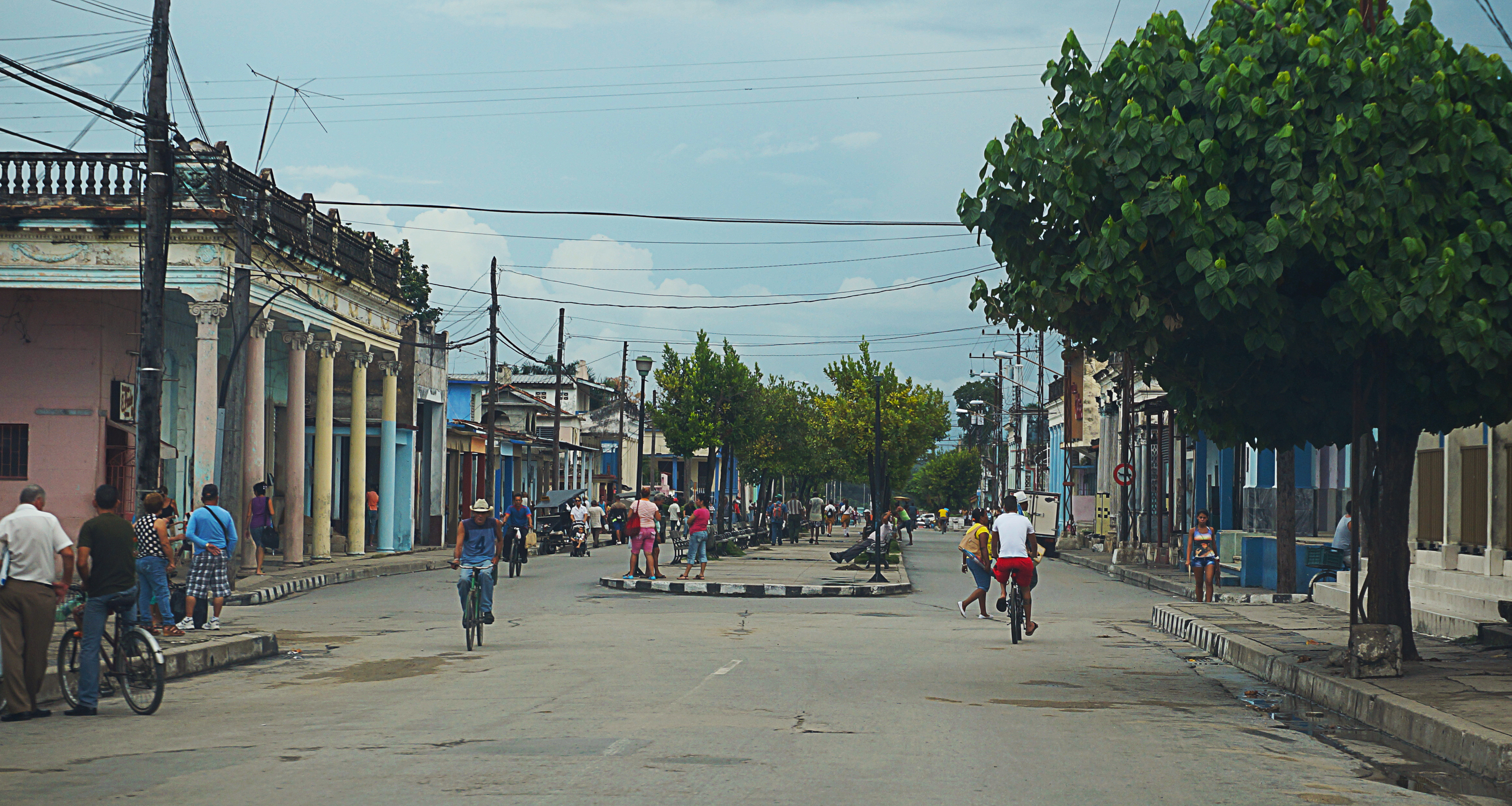
- A road in the town centre

- Flag Coat of arms

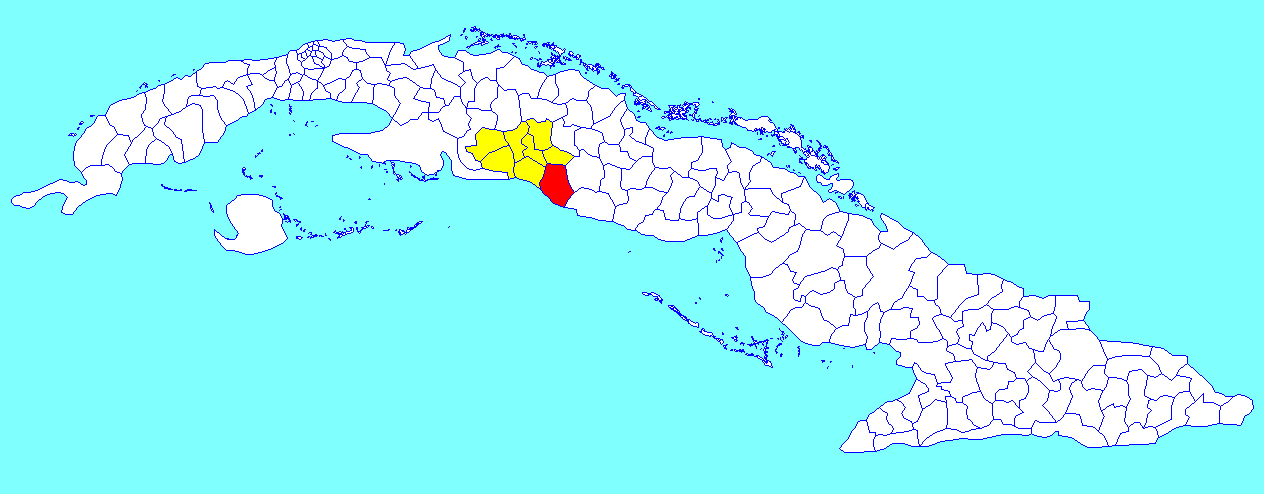
- Cumanayagua municipality (red) within Cienfuegos Province (yellow) and Cuba
- Coordinates: 22°09′8″N 80°12′4″W
- Country: Cuba
- Province: Cienfuegos
- Town rights: 1804

Area
  - Total: 1,099 km^{2} (424 sq mi)
- Elevation: 60 m (200 ft)

Population (2022)
  - Total: 47,118
  - Density: 42.87/km^{2} (111.0/sq mi)
- Time zone: UTC-5 (EST)
- Area code: +53-432
- Website: https://cumanayagua.gob.cu/

Cumanayagua (Spanish pronunciation: [kumanaˈʝaɣwa]) is a municipality and town in the Cienfuegos Province of Cuba. It is located in a valley near the Guamuhaya Mountains (usually these mountains are referred as Escambray Mountains, 23 kilometres (14 mi) east of Cienfuegos, the provincial capital.

== History ==
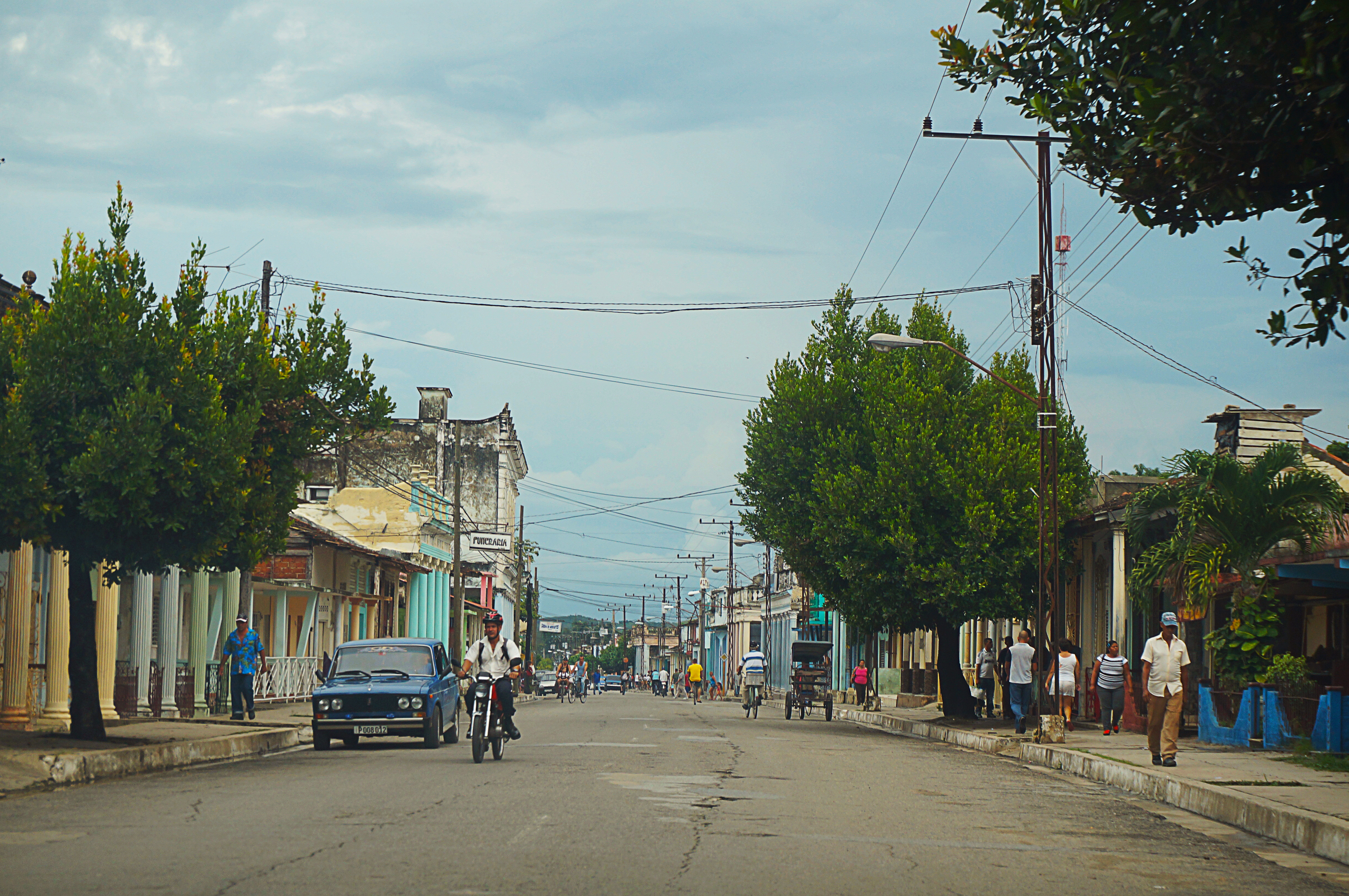
A road in town's centre

Cumanayagua was inhabited by Cuban Taíno indigenous people when the Spanish arrived to the island. Though the meaning of the name is uncertain, is known it comes from Taino Arawak origin. Some scholars believe it means "The place filled with flowers of Royal Palms" other believe it could mean "The place of Cuma and Anayagua", Cuma was the aboriginal chief ruler of the region, and Anayagua his daughter and heir to the chiefdom.

The village was established by Spanish and Cuban creole under Colonial times with a longer name and the village was officially established as a town on 3 May 1804, under the name of San Felipe de Cumanayagua. This name was retained until 1878 when it was changed into "Santa Cruz de Cumanayagua", and finally at the turn of the 20th century got its definitive and shorter Taino name it has today.

== Geography ==
Located in the south-eastern corner of the province, by the Caribbean Coast and at the borders with the province of Villa Clara and Sancti Spíritus; the municipal territory includes part of Escambray Mountain Range and the nature reserves of Topes de Collantes and Pico San Juan. The town lies in south of Avilés Reservoir and is crossed by the Hanabanilla River.

The municipality borders with the ones of Cienfuegos, Palmira, Cruces, Manicaragua and Trinidad. It counts several hamlets (villages and localities), as Arimao, Barajagua, Camilo Cienfuegos, Entronque de Minas, Gavillán, Guajimico, Hoyo de Padilla, La Clara, La Sierrita, Las Moscas, Playa El Inglés, Playa Yaguanabo, San Blas, San Francisco and San Juan.

== Demographics ==
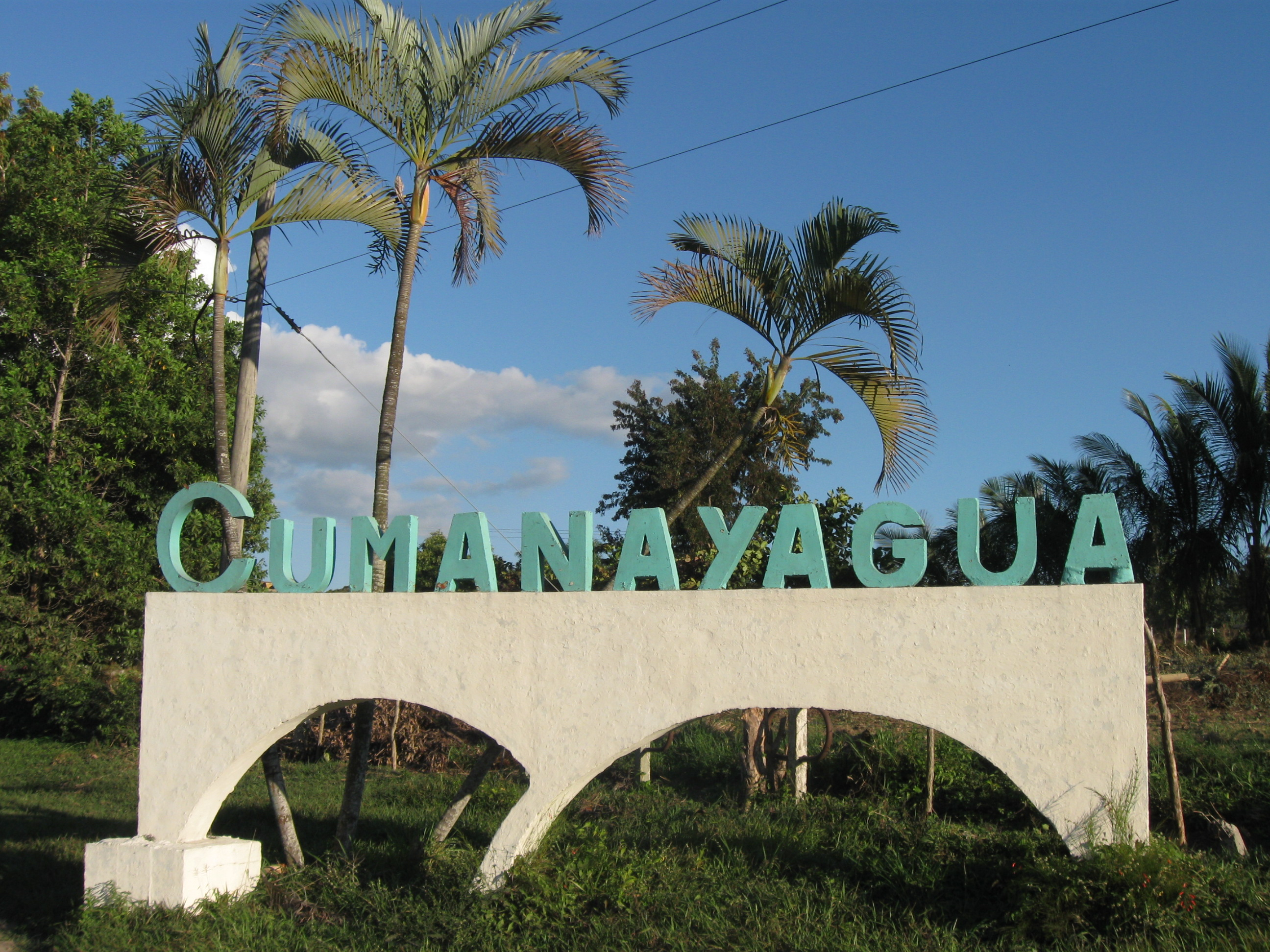
A stone-made signboard at the entrance of the municipality

In 2022, the municipality of Cumanayagua had a population of 47,118. With a total area of 1,099 km^{2} (424 sq mi), it has a population density of 43/km^{2} (110/sq mi).

== Economy ==
Citrus fruits and coffee are grown in the municipality of Cumanayagua.

== See also ==
- Municipalities of Cuba
- List of cities in Cuba
