= Ciego Montero =

Cuban brand of bottled water

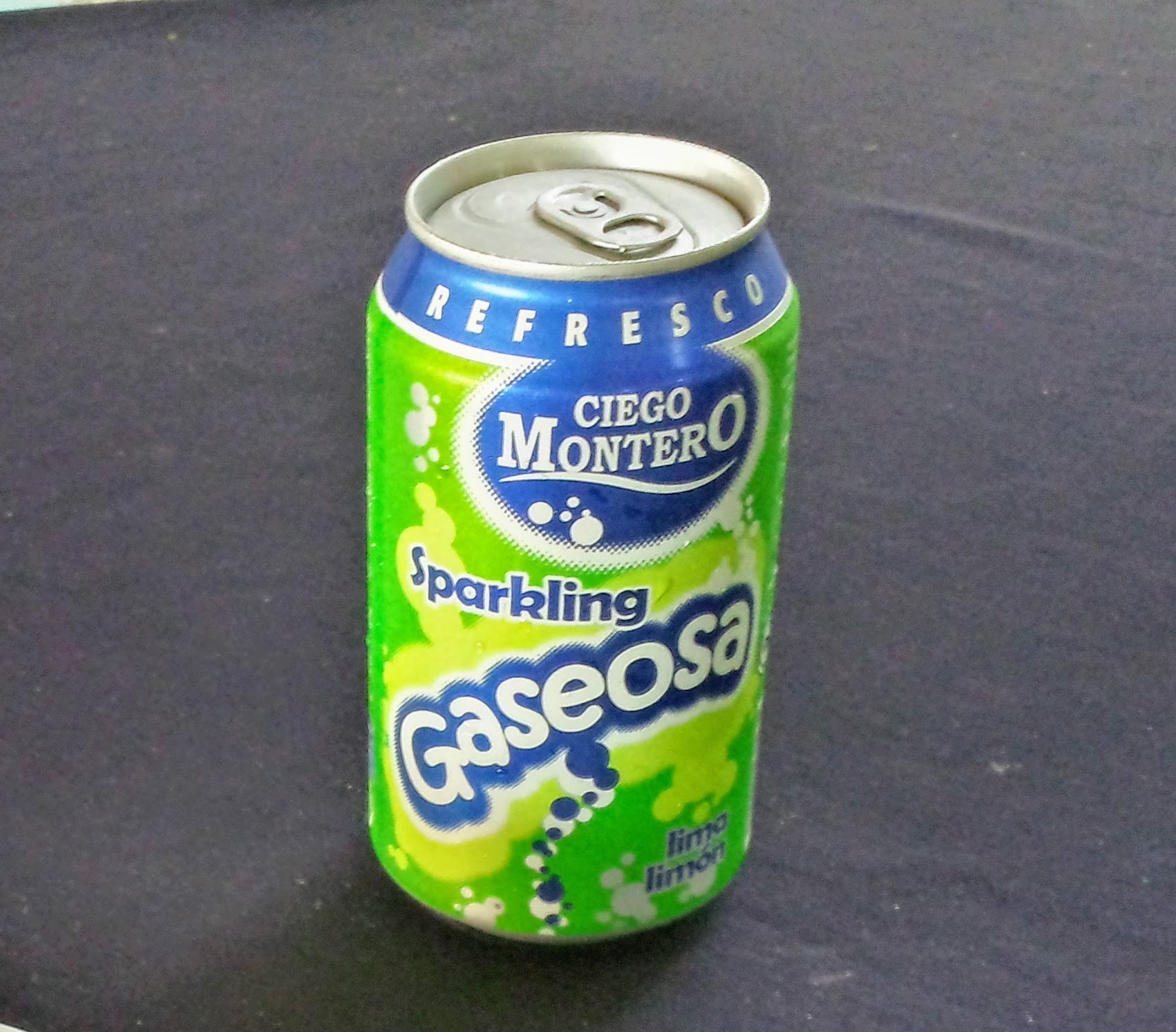
- A can of Gaseosa showing the logo of Ciego Montero
- Country: Cuba
- Produced by: Los Portales SA
- Source: Arriete-Ciego Montero
- Type: Still and Sparkling
- Calcium (Ca): 112
- Chloride (Cl): 22
- Bicarbonate (HCO_{3}): 354
- Magnesium (Mg): 3
- Sodium (Na): low
- Sulfate (SO_{4}): 16
- TDS: 376
- Website: ciegomontero.com
- All concentrations in milligrams per liter (mg/L); pH without units

Ciego Montero is a Cuban brand of bottled water, part of Nestlé Waters, established in 1985 and owned by the Cuban society Los Portales. Based in the village of Arriete-Ciego Montero, it produces the homonym water and soft drinks (refrescos) as the Gaseosa or the tuKola.

== History ==
Production of Ciego Montero began in Guane, a town in Pinar del Río Province, a few years after the foundation of the Los Portales S.A.

== Products ==
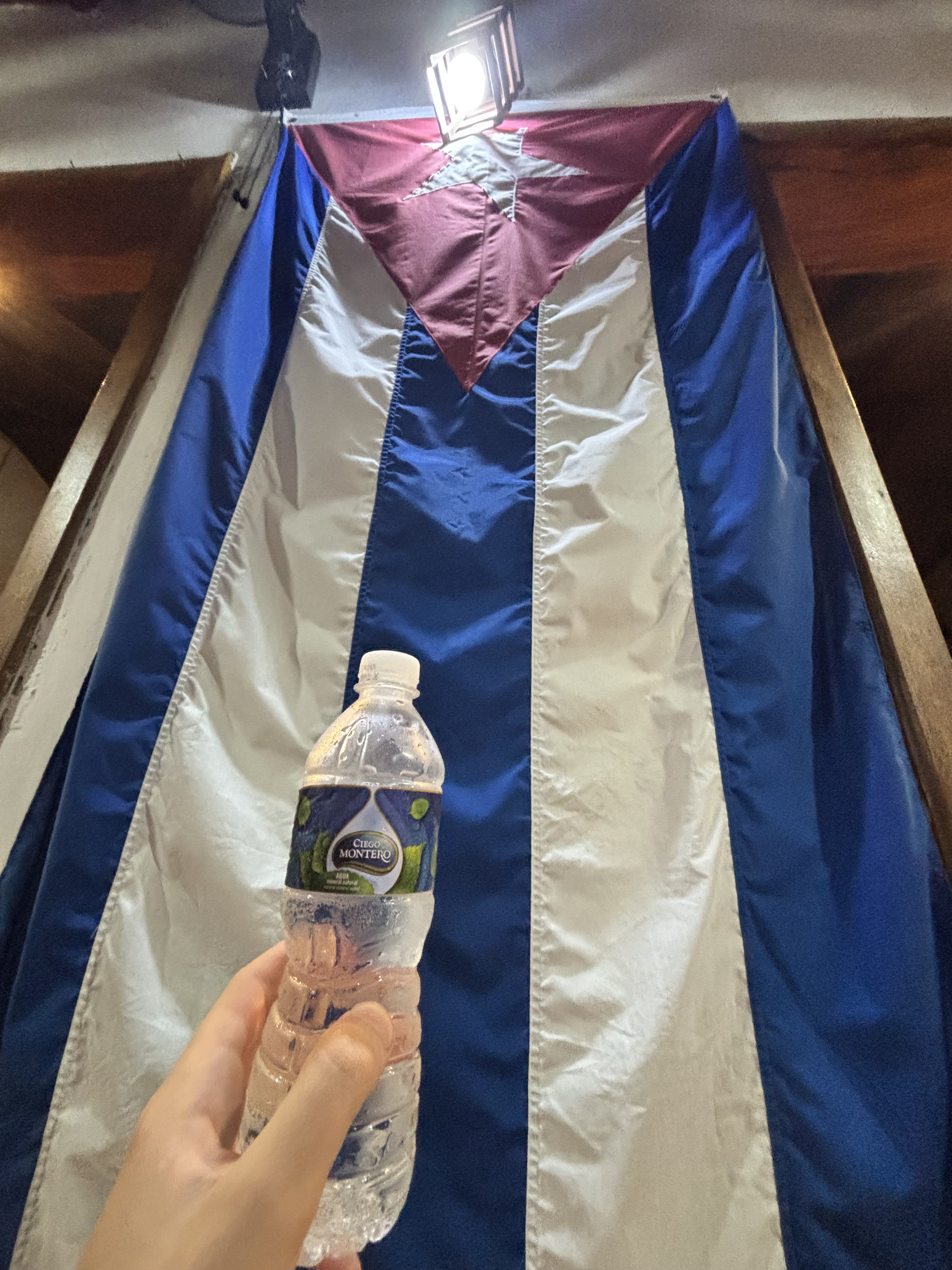
A Ciego Montero–branded water bottle in front of a Cuban flag, in June 2025.

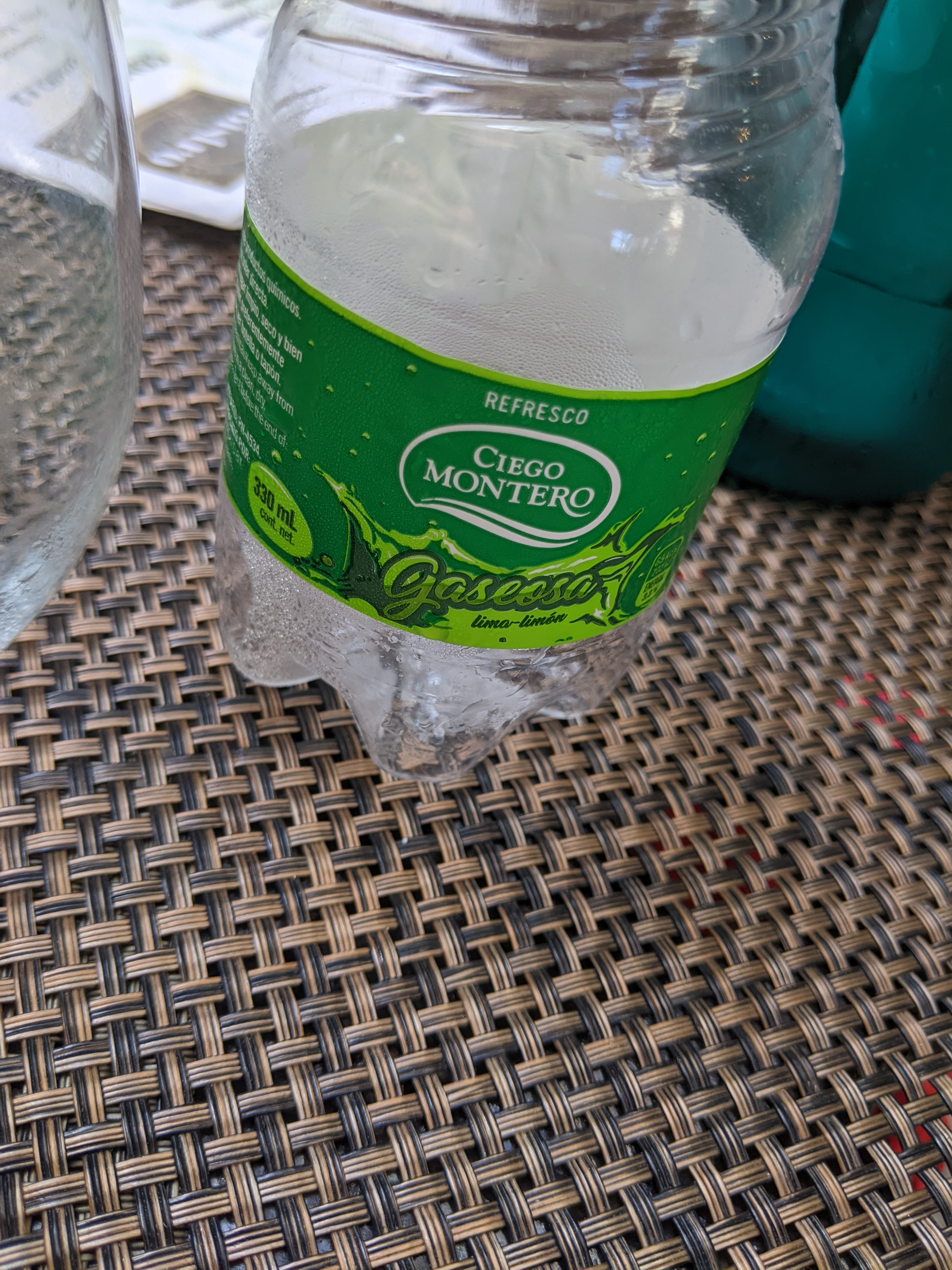
Ciego Montero - Lemon Lime flavor

| Product | Type |
|---|---|
| Agua Mineral Natural Ciego Montero | Water (still and sparkling) |
| Agua Tónica | Tonic water |
| Refresco Gaseosa | Lemon-lime drink |
| Refresco Mate | Mate ice tea |
| Refresco Naranja | Orange soft drink |
| Refresco Piñita | Pineapple soda |
| Refresco tuKola | Cola (classic and diet) |

== See also ==
- List of Nestlé brands
- List of bottled water brands
- List of soft drinks by country
