= Cienfuegos Province =

Province of Cuba

- Province of Cuba
- Coat of arms

- Country: Cuba
- Capital: Cienfuegos

Government
  - Governor: Yolexis Rodríguez Armada

Area
  - Total: 4,186.60 km^{2} (1,616.46 sq mi)

Population (2010-12-31)
  - Total: 405,481
  - Density: 96.8521/km^{2} (250.846/sq mi)
- Time zone: UTC-5 (EST)
- Area code: +53-43
- ISO 3166 code: CU-06
- HDI (2019): 0.783 high · 9th of 16
- Website: www.cienfuegos.gob.cu/es

Cienfuegos (Spanish pronunciation: [sjeɱˈfweɣos]) is one of the provinces of Cuba. The capital city of the province is also called Cienfuegos and was founded by French settlers in 1819.

== Overview ==
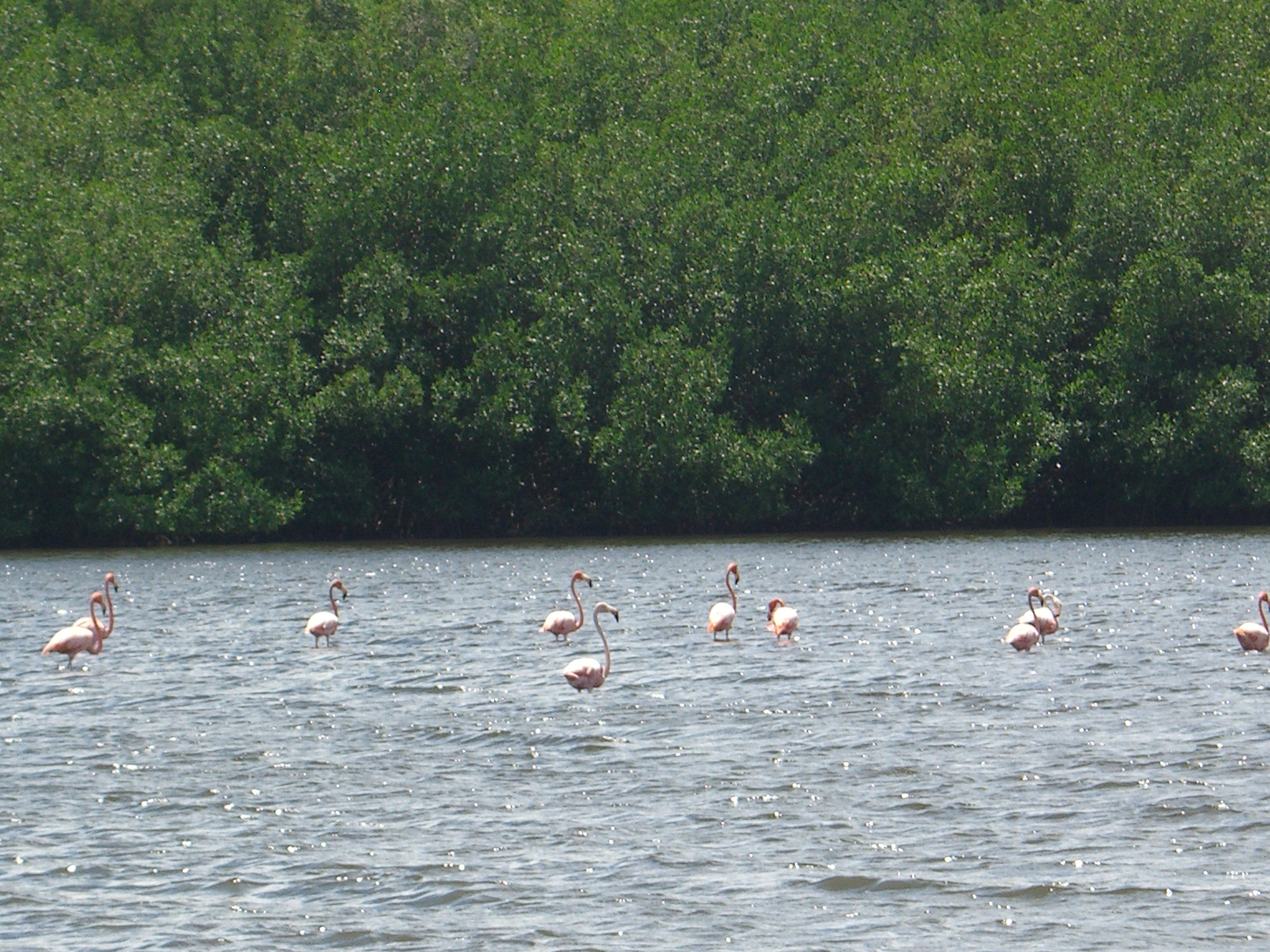
Flamingos in the Guanaroca lagoon

Until 2011, Cienfuegos was the smallest province in Cuba (excluding the city of Havana and the Isla de la Juventud) with an economy almost entirely dedicated to the growing and processing of sugar. Sugar mills and sugarcane plantations dot the landscape. There are waterfalls in the sierra of the province.

Scuba diving off Cienfuegos province is extremely popular both with tourists and locals. There are numerous underwater caves, and well over 50 dive sites in the province.

The provinces of Cienfuegos, Sancti Spíritus, and Villa Clara were once all part of the now defunct province of Santa Clara.

== Municipalities ==
Municipality	Population (2004)	Population (2022)	Area (km^{2})	Location	Remarks
Abreus	30,330	30,277	564	22.28056°N 80.56778°W	
Aguada de Pasajeros	31,687	31,279	680	22.38472°N 80.84611°W	
Cienfuegos	163,824	178,368	333	22.14583°N 80.43639°W	Provincial capital
Cruces	32,139	28,977	198	22.34222°N 80.27611°W	
Cumanayagua	51,435	47,118	1,099	22.15250°N 80.20111°W	
Lajas	22,602	21,187	430	22.41639°N 80.29056°W	
Palmira	33,153	31,813	318	22.24444°N 80.39417°W	
Rodas	33,477	32,719	552	22.34278°N 80.55528°W	

Source: Population from 2004 Census. Area from 1976 municipal re-distribution.

== Demographics ==
In 2004, the province of Cienfuegos had a population of 398,647. With a total area of 4,180 km^{2} (1,610 sq mi), the province had a population density of 95.37/km^{2} (247.0/sq mi).
