= Cruces, Cuba =

Cruces
- Municipality
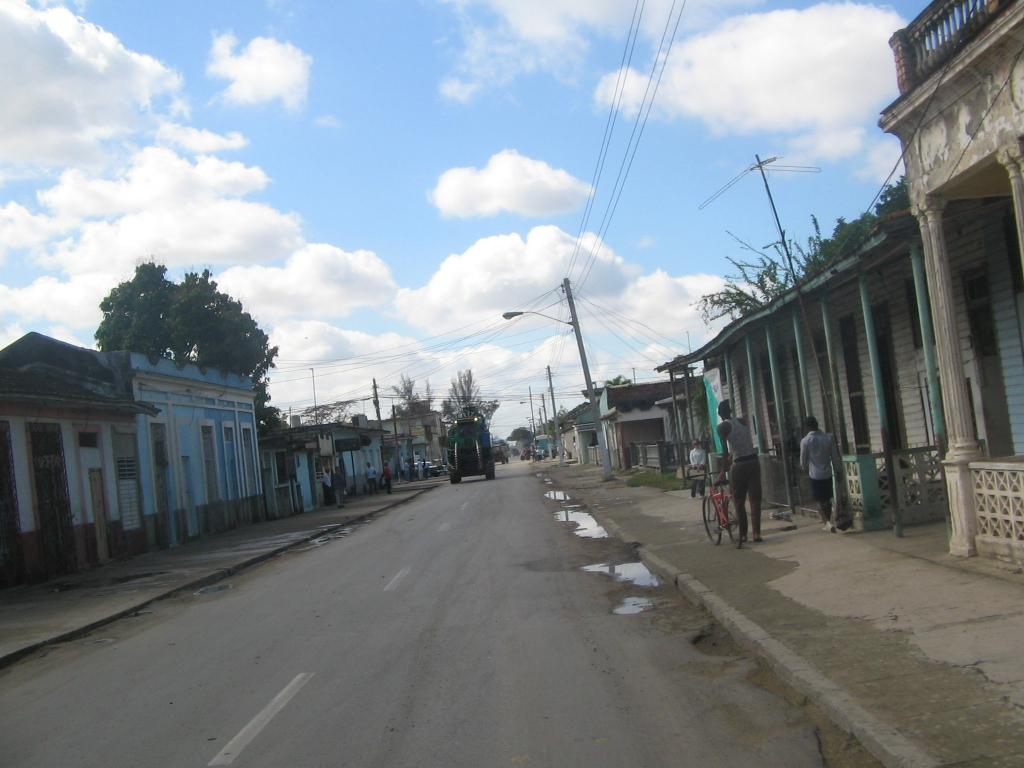
- The state road crossing the north of Cruces

- Flag Coat of arms

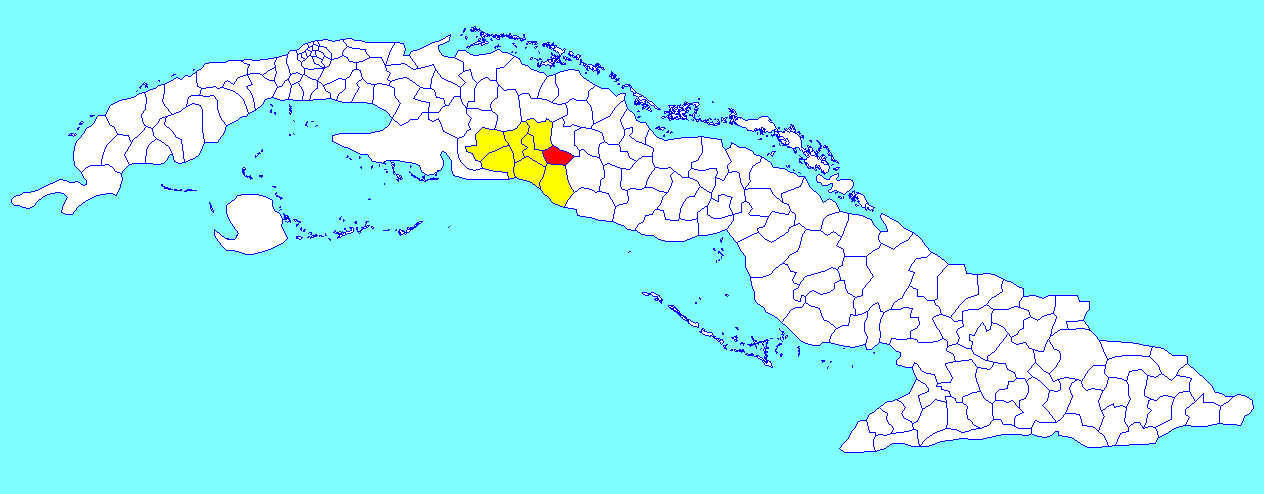
- Cruces municipality (red) within Cienfuegos Province (yellow) and Cuba
- Coordinates: 22°20′31″N 80°16′34″W
- Country: Cuba
- Province: Cienfuegos
- Founded: 1852

Area
  - Total: 198 km^{2} (76 sq mi)
- Elevation: 95 m (312 ft)

Population (2022)
  - Total: 28,977
  - Density: 146/km^{2} (379/sq mi)
- Time zone: UTC-5 (EST)
- Area code: +53-432
- Website: https://cruces.gob.cu/

Cruces (Spanish pronunciation: [ˈkɾuses]) is a municipality and town in Cienfuegos Province, Cuba. It is the home of the Mal Tiempo National Park which commemorates a battle in the 1895 War of Independence.

== History ==
The town was founded in 1852 in a place known as Sabana de Ibarra. The construction of a railway between Cienfugos Province and Villa Clara began in 1848, causing an economic boom and the expansion of the town. The railway reached the town in 1855.There were five sugar mills in the vicinity of Cruces, known by the traditional names San Francisco, Andreita, Santa Catalina, Caracas and Hormiguero.

=== The Battle of Bad Weather ===
The town is noted for the Battle of Bad Weather (La Batalla de Mal Tiempo), in which Cuban rebels (Mambises) fought Spanish colonialists during the Cuban War of Independence. On December 15, 1895, Cuban rebels engaged Spanish troops near the town of Cruces in the sugar fields of the Mal Tiempo (Bad Weather) sugar mill, setting fire to the sugarcane fields and charging the Spanish with machetes. The Cuban Liberation Army reported four of their own dead and as many wounded, while claiming to have inflicted "about 200" casualties on the enemy. The Cuban forces also captured 150 Mauser and 60 Remington rifles, six boxes of ammunition, horses, mules, first aid supplies, and the flags and documents of the Spanish forces.

=== Monument and Park ===
In 1909, a monument was commissioned to mark the location of the mass grave of Spanish and Cuban casualties of the Battle of Bad Weather. As part of the construction of the monument, the Spanish and Cuban casualties were to be exhumed, identified, and later re-buried. The bodies of 79 Spaniards and seven Cubans were exhumed, with the bodies re-interred within the base of the monument, visible through a glass viewing portal on the monument itself.

The monument was completed in 1910, with a park constructed around the monument in 1950. In 1963, the monument was destroyed, but was reconstructed "as closely as possible to the original" in 1965. The monument was declared a National Monument in October 1978, along with four other monuments within the province of Cienfuegos. The glass viewing portal was replaced with an opaque marble cover in preparation for becoming a National Monument.

A commemorative inscription at the site states that on 15 December 1895, Cuban independence forces commanded by Antonio Maceo and Máximo Gómez defeated Spanish forces there. The inscription also includes a quotation attributed to Maceo concerning resistance to foreign control of Cuba.

This inscription translates loosely to "In this historic place on December 15, 1895, the liberator and general Antonio Maceo y Máximo Gómez defeated the forces of the Spanish in a decisive battle, demonstrating once again the courage, bravery, and steadfastness of our heroic Mambises. 'Whoever tries to seize Cuba will cover the soil with their blood, if not perish in the fight'." - Antonio Maceo

== Industry ==
The principal industry of the town is the refinement of sugar. The nearby Mal Tiempo (previously "Andreita") sugar mill remains active, while the Marta Abreu (previously "San Francisco") sugar mill was put into "reserve" status by the Cuban government under the 2002 restructure of the country's sugar-producing industry.

The Municipality of Cruces contains 2 Companies, 3 State Economic Organizations, 6 Budged Units, 3 Agricultural Production Cooperatives, 6 Cooperatives of Credits and Services, 5 Basic Units of Cooperative Production, and 14 Establishments. Located in the town are the Marta Abreu pasta factory and the Cubasol cookie factory.

== Geography ==
The municipality is divided into the barrios of Estrada Palma, Mal Tiempo, Marta and Monte Cristo. It is located in the northwestern part of the province of Cienfugos, bounded on the north by Ranchuelo, on the south by Palmira, on the East by Cumanayagua, and on the west with Lajás. The Caonao River flows through the eastern portion of the municipality.

Topographically, the land is mostly flat with some small hills, such as the hills of La Rioja and Andreita.

== Demographics ==
In 2022, the municipality of Cruces had a population of 28,977. With a total area of 198 km^{2} (76 sq mi), it has a population density of 150/km^{2} (390/sq mi).

== Education ==
Education was provided by two Catholic Schools and several public schools for the Grammar Levels. One High School was home to roughly 800 students. Higher education was conducted in Cienfuegos or Santa Clara, distant 11 and 28 miles (45 km) respectively.

== Notable people ==
- Martin Dihigo (1906-1971), Negro league baseball player, nickname The Immortal . Member Baseball Hall of Fame. Cooperstown
- José Abreu (born 1987), baseball player

== See also ==
- Municipalities of Cuba
- List of cities in Cuba
