= Lajas, Cuba =

Lajas
- Municipality
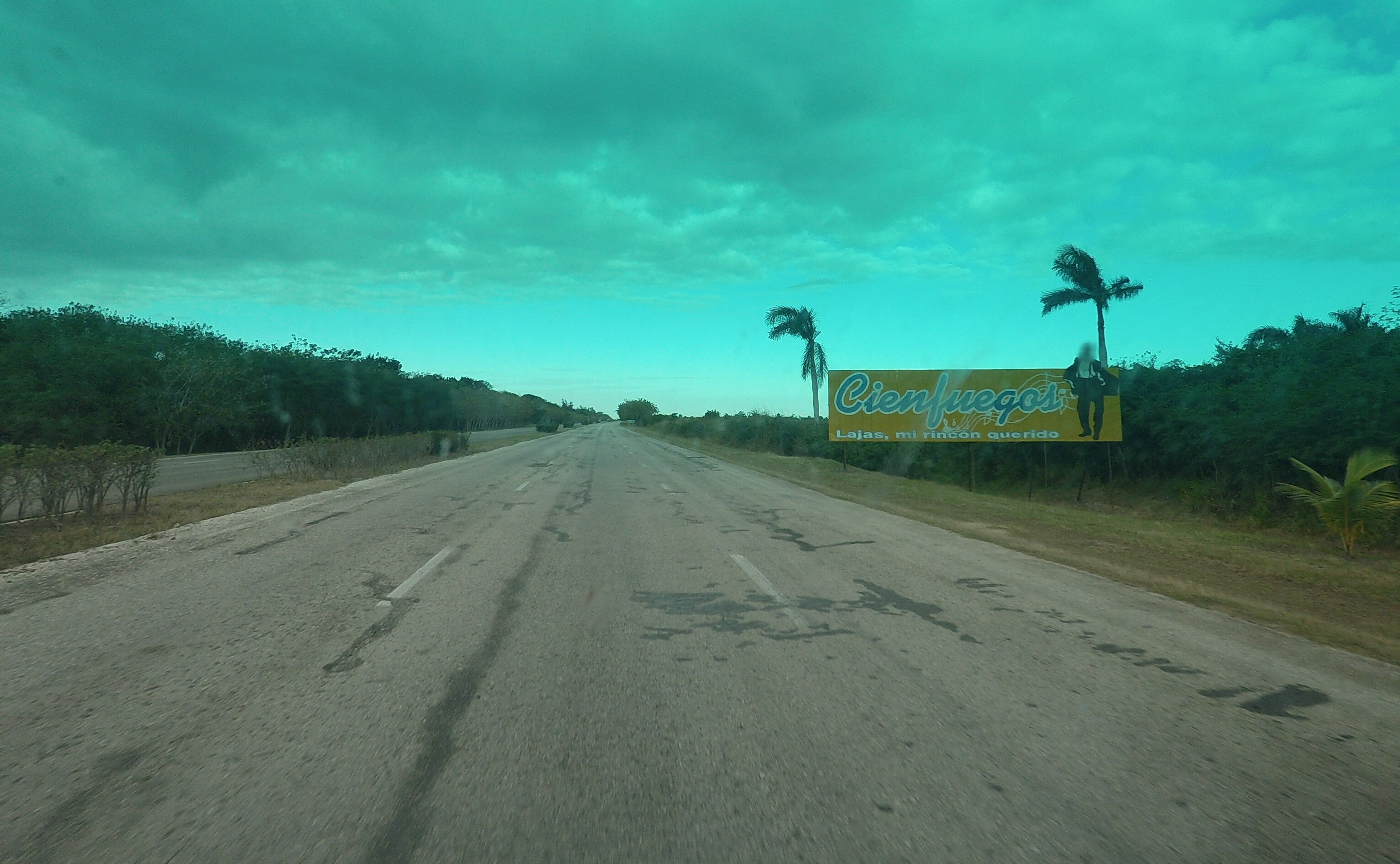
- Sign seen entering the municipality on the Autopista A1

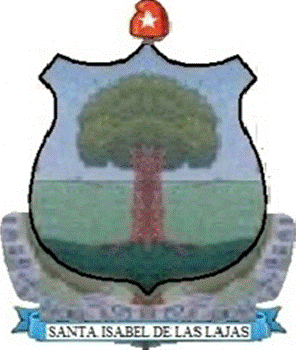
- Seal

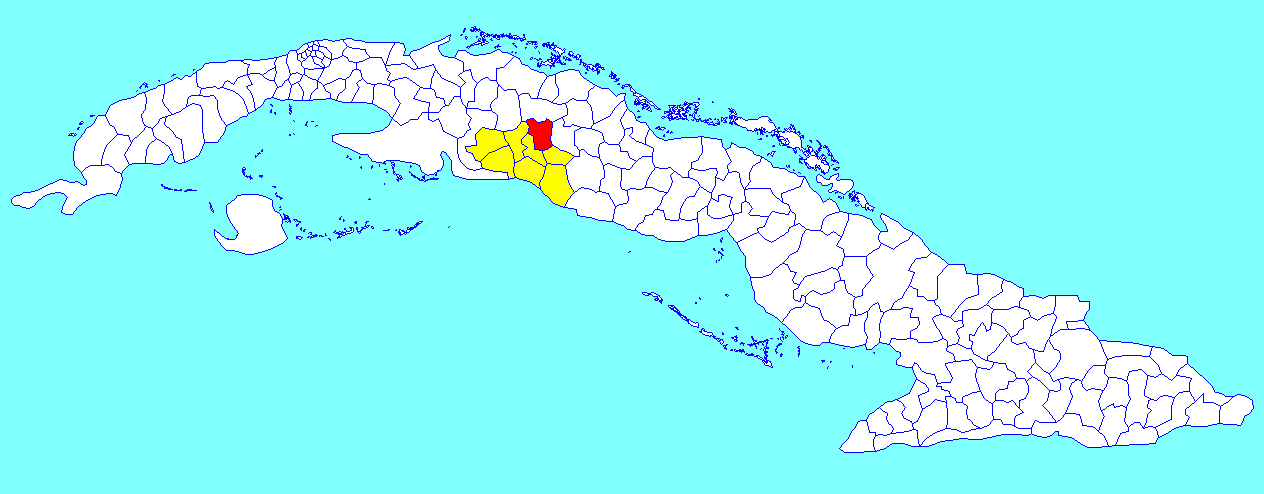
- Lajas municipality (red) within Cienfuegos Province (yellow) and Cuba
- Coordinates: 22°24′59″N 80°17′26″W
- Country: Cuba
- Province: Cienfuegos

Area
  - Total: 430 km^{2} (170 sq mi)
- Elevation: 75 m (246 ft)

Population (2022)
  - Total: 21,187
  - Density: 49/km^{2} (130/sq mi)
- Time zone: UTC-5 (EST)
- Area code: +53-432
- Website: https://lajas.gob.cu/

Lajas, known historically and culturally as Santa Isabel de las Lajas, is a municipality and town in the Cienfuegos Province of Cuba. It is located in the northern part of the province, 35 kilometres (22 mi) west of Santa Clara and immediately south of the A1 motorway.

== History ==
The firsts settlements of the area began in 1800, with Lajas forming on August 29, 1824, named Santa Isabel de las Lajas, after a Canary Islander named it after his wife, Isabel Castellón. In 1854 Lajas changed from a hamlet into a town by Ayuntamiento of the city of Cienfuegos. In 1879 it became a municipality of the former Santa Clara Province. In 1986, El Grupo Técnico Asesor (GTA) of Cuba made the name of the municipality in just simply Lajas.

== Demographics ==
In 2022, the municipality of Lajas had a population of 21,187. With a total area of 430 km^{2} (170 sq mi), it has a population density of 49/km^{2} (130/sq mi).

== See also ==
- Municipalities of Cuba
- List of cities in Cuba
