= Circuito Norte =

Highway in Cuba

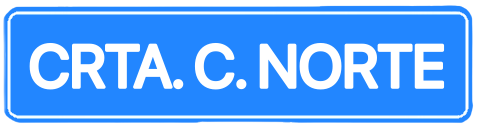
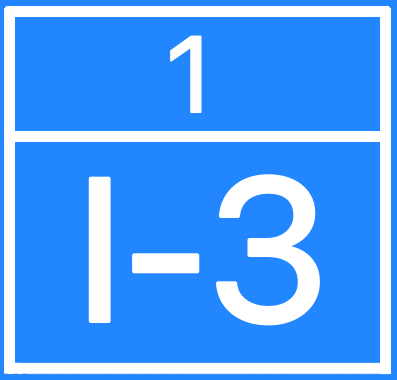
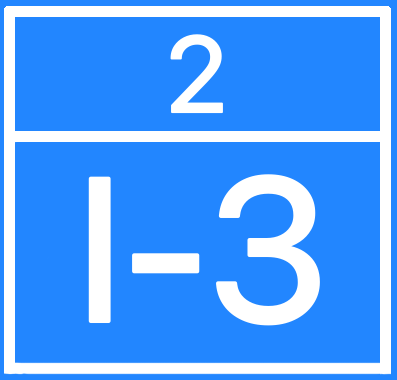
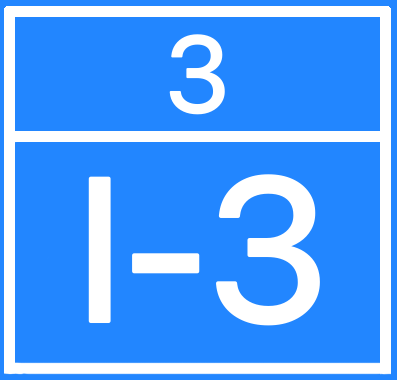
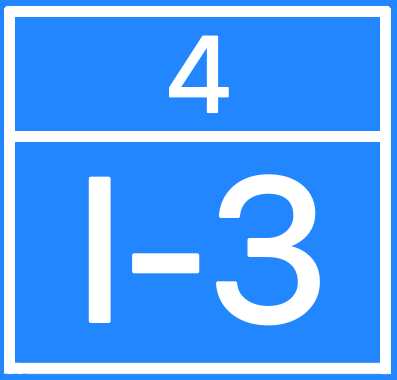
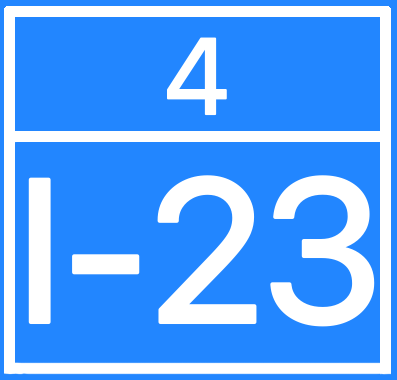
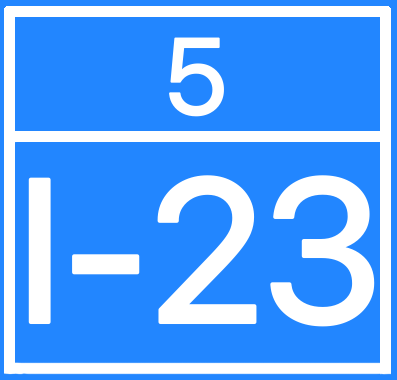
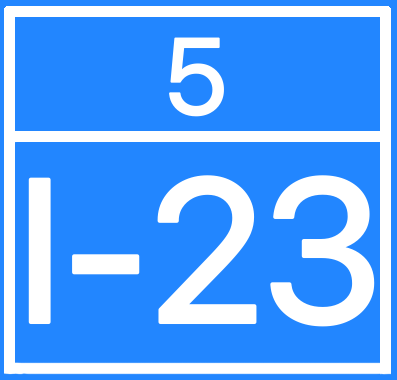
Route Number Sign commonly used Circuito Norte (CN)
- Northern Circuit
- 1–I–3; 2–I–3; 3–I–3; 4–I–3; 4–I–23; 5–I–23; 6–I–23
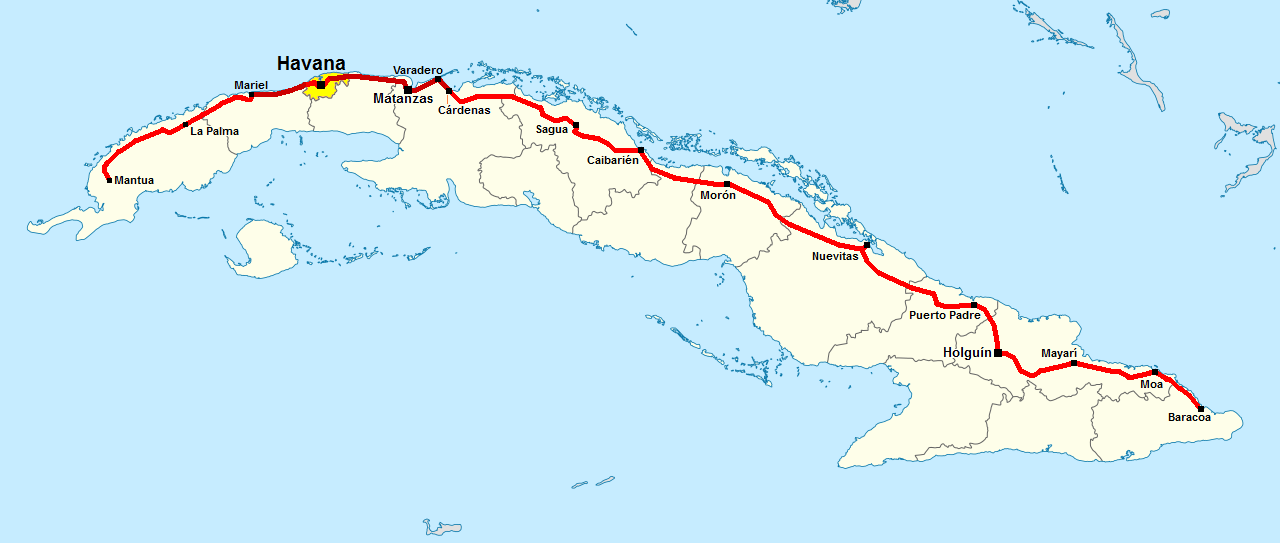
- Map of the CN highlighting, in dark red, the motorways "Vía Blanca" and "Panamericana", both part of its route

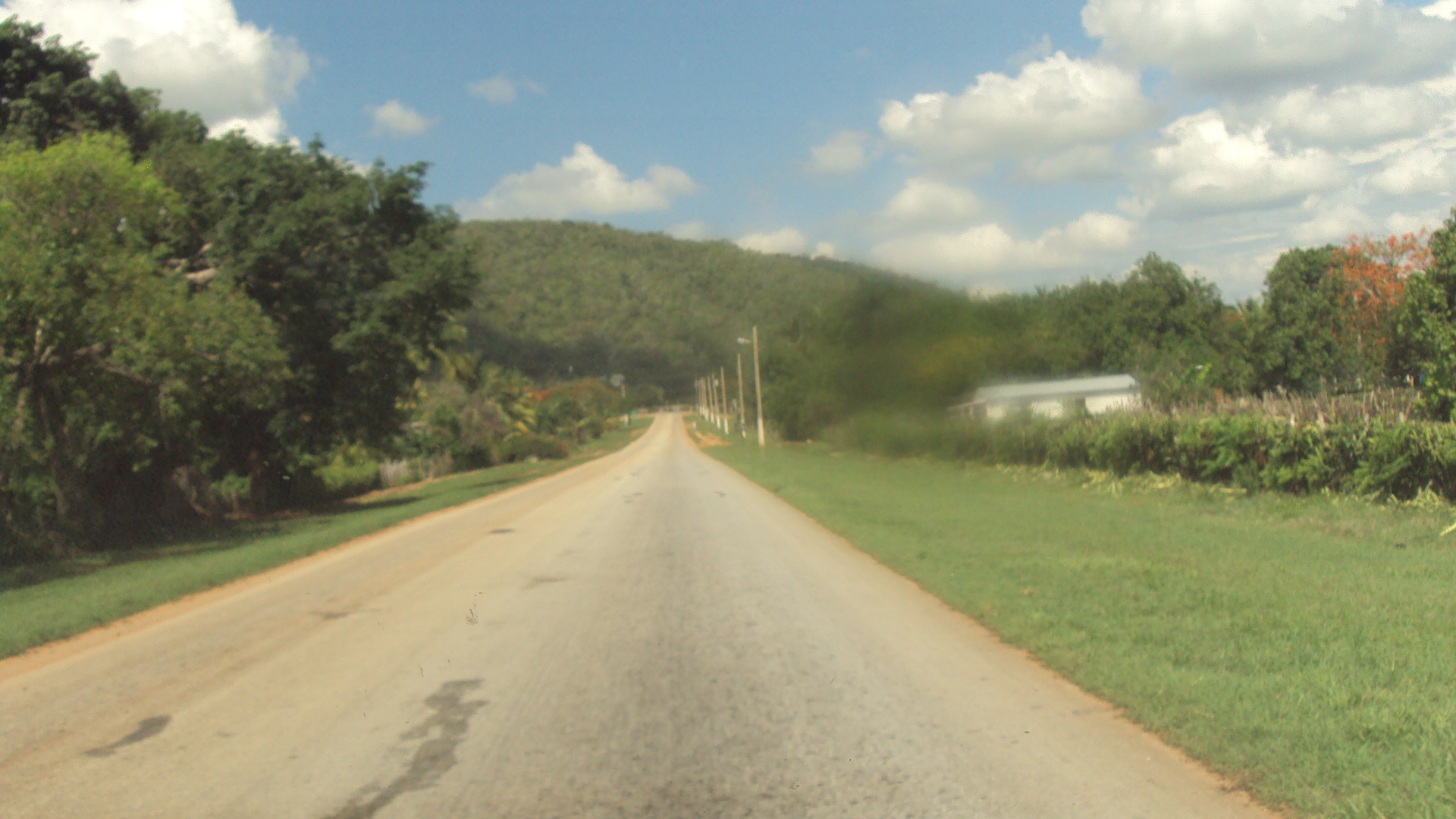
- The CN across the municipality of Bolivia

Route information
- Length: 1,222 km (759 mi)

1–I–3
- West end: 1–1 in Mantua
- Major intersections: 1–241 in Entronque La Palma
- East end: 2–I–3 near Cabañas

2–I–3
- West end: 1–I–3 near Cabañas
- Major intersections: A4–1 near Nodarse; A2 / 2–400 near Habana del Este
- East end: 3–I–3 near Bacunayagua

3–I–3
- West end: 2–I–3 near Bacunayagua
- Major intersections: 3–N–1 in Matanzas; Autopista Sur extension in Varadero; 3–101
- East end: 4–I–3 near Palma Sola

4–I–3
- West end: 3–I–3 near Palma Sola
- Major intersections: 4–221 in Sitiecito 4–311 in Encrucijada 4–321 in Entronque de Vueltas
- East end: 4–I–23 in Caibarién

4–I–23
- West end: 4–I–3 in Caibarién
- Major intersections: Pedraplén Cayo Santa María near Cambaíto; 4–531 in Yaguajay
- East end: 5–I–23 near Mabuya

5–I–23
- West end: 4–I–23 near Mabuya
- Major intersections: 5–151 in Morón; 5–445 near San Agustin
- East end: 6–I–23 near Manati

6–I–23
- West end: 5–I–23 near Mabuya
- Major intersections: 6–123 near Puerto Padre; 6–371 in Entronque de Caballería
- East end: 6–N–1 in Baracoa

Location
- Country: Cuba
- Major cities: Mantua, Mariel, Havana, Santa Cruz del Norte, Matanzas, Varadero, Cárdenas, Sagua la Grande, Remedios, Caibarién, Yaguajay, Morón, Nuevitas, Puerto Padre, Holguín, Mayarí, Sagua de Tánamo, Moa, Baracoa

Highway system
- Roads in Cuba

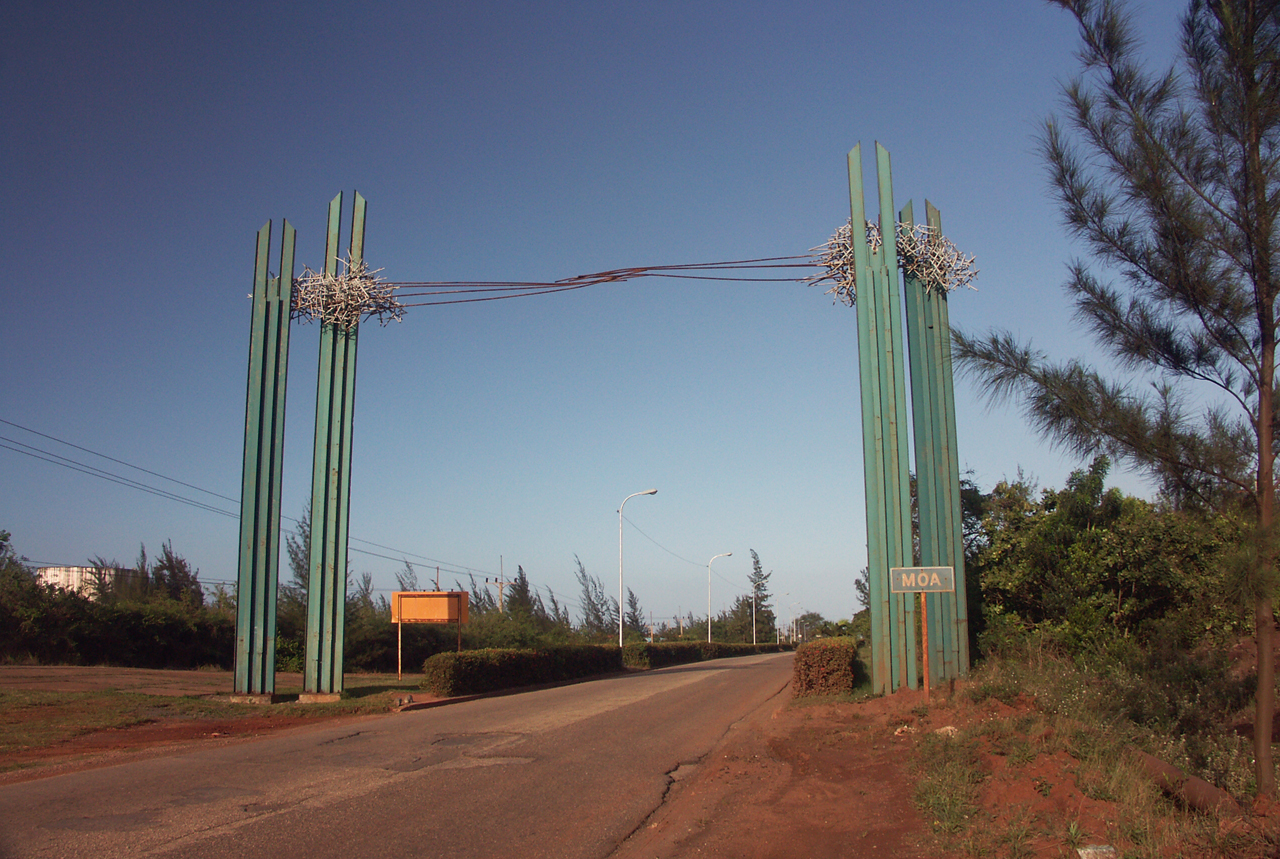
The CN at the entrance of Moa

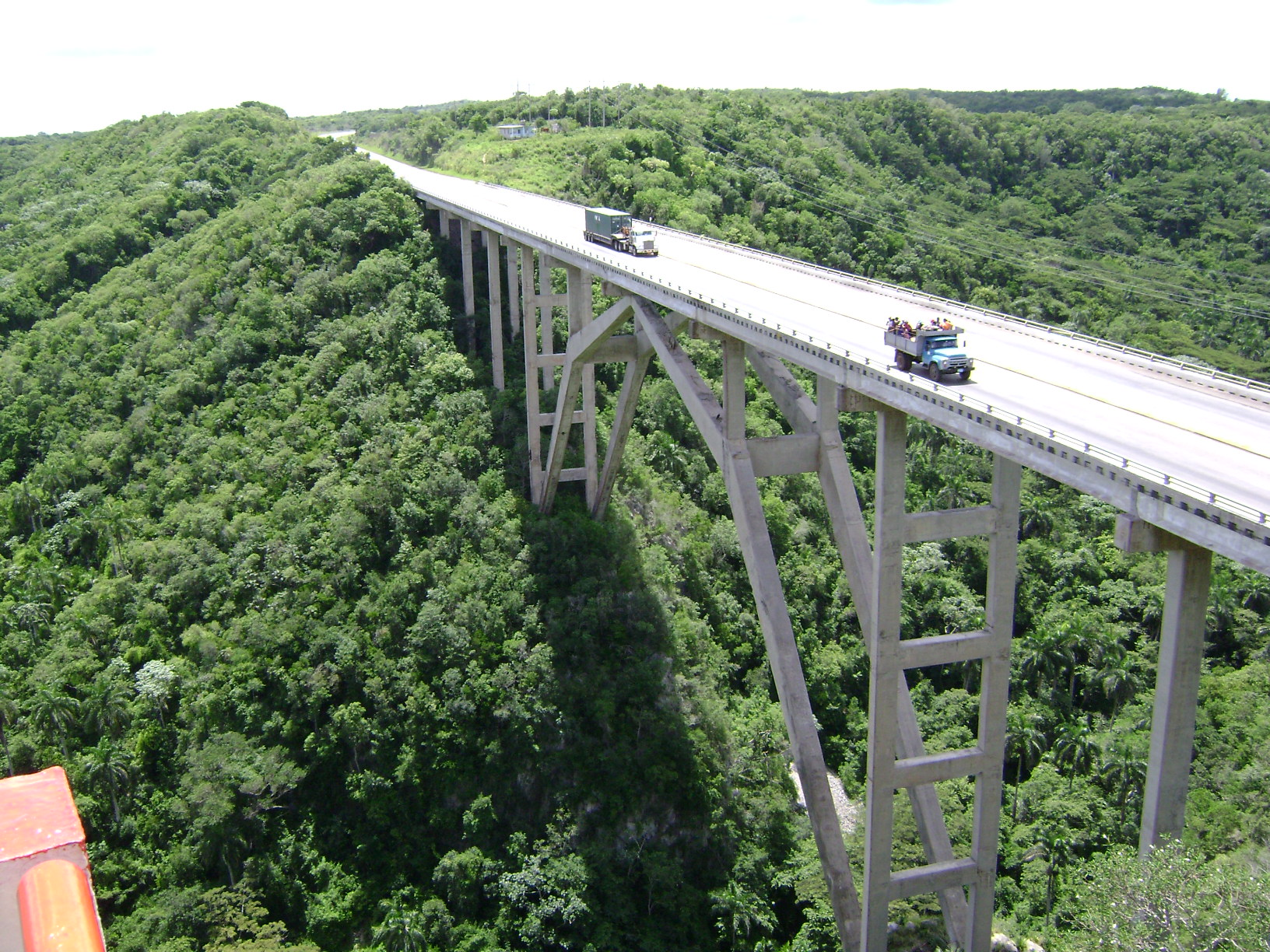
Bacunayagua Bridge

The Circuito Norte (CN), meaning "Northern Circuit", is a west-east highway spanning the length of the island of Cuba, through the Atlantic Coast. With a length of 1,222 km, it is the second-longest Cuban highway, after the "Carretera Central"; and two sections of it, named "Vía Blanca" and "Panamericana", are classified as Expressways. The road has different route numbers depending on the regions, using 1–I–3, 2–I–3, 3–I–3, 4–I–3, 4–I–23, 5–I–23, and 6–I–23.

== Route ==
=== Description ===
The CN starts in Mantua, in the west of Pinar del Río Province and, through the northern side of the island, crosses the provinces of Artemisa, Havana, Mayabeque, Matanzas, Villa Clara, Sancti Spíritus, Ciego de Ávila, Camagüey, Las Tunas and Holguín; until its end in Baracoa, Guantánamo Province, in which it shares the eastern endpoint of the Carretera Central. The motorway sections link Mariel to western Havana (the Panamericana), and eastern Havana to Cárdenas (Vía Blanca).

The road is mostly made up of roads in northern Cuba made before the Circuito Norte being connected together.

=== Table ===
The table below shows the route of the Circuito Norte. Note: Provincial seats are shown in bold; the names shown under brackets in the section "Municipality" indicate the municipal seats; the symbol indicates the motorway section.

Settlement	Municipality	Province	Part of
Mantua	Mantua	Pinar del Río	1-1
Vista Hermosa	Mantua	Pinar del Río	
Dimas (crossroad)	Mantua	Pinar del Río	
Baja	Minas de Matahambre	Pinar del Río	
Río del Medio (crossroad)	Minas de Matahambre	Pinar del Río	
Santa Lucía	Minas de Matahambre	Pinar del Río	
La Sabana	Minas de Matahambre	Pinar del Río	
Sitio Morales	Minas de Matahambre	Pinar del Río	
San Cayetano (to Puerto Esperanza)	Viñales	Pinar del Río	
Entronque La Palma (to Viñales)	Viñales	Pinar del Río	
Mina La Constancia	Viñales	Pinar del Río	
La Jagua	La Palma	Pinar del Río	
Bella María	La Palma	Pinar del Río	
La Palma	La Palma	Pinar del Río	
La Ceya	La Palma	Pinar del Río	
Manuel Sanguily	La Palma	Pinar del Río	
Las Cadenas	La Palma	Pinar del Río	
La Mulata	La Palma	Pinar del Río	
Las Pozas	Bahía Honda	Artemisa	
Tres Palmas	Bahía Honda	Artemisa	
El Volador	Bahía Honda	Artemisa	
Harlem (crossroad)	Bahía Honda	Artemisa	
Bahía Honda	Bahía Honda	Artemisa	
San Diego de Nuñez (crossroad)	Bahía Honda	Artemisa	
San Juan de Dios	Bahía Honda	Artemisa	
Orozco	Bahía Honda	Artemisa	
Silvio Caro	Bahía Honda	Artemisa	
Cabañas	Mariel	Artemisa	
Sandino	Mariel	Artemisa	
Dominica-Santa Isabel	Mariel	Artemisa	
Josefina	Mariel	Artemisa	
San Jacinto-Las Mangas	Mariel	Artemisa	
Quiebrahacha	Mariel	Artemisa	
Río Bongo	Mariel	Artemisa	
Nodarse	Mariel	Artemisa	
Mariel	Mariel	Artemisa	
La Boca	Mariel	Artemisa	Carretera Panamericana
Mujica	Mariel	Artemisa	Carretera Panamericana
Santa Barbara	Mariel	Artemisa	Carretera Panamericana
Nuevo Mariel	Mariel	Artemisa	Carretera Panamericana
Boca Guajaibón	Mariel	Artemisa	Carretera Panamericana
Menelao Mora	Caimito	Artemisa	Carretera Panamericana
El Salado	Caimito	Artemisa	Carretera Panamericana
Playa Baracoa	Bauta	Artemisa	Carretera Panamericana
**Havana** (Motorway sections limited to west and east suburbs)	The CN crosses the municipal boroughs of Playa, Plaza de la Revolución, Cerro, Habana Vieja, Diez de Octubre, Regla, San Miguel del Padrón, Guanabacoa, Habana del Este	Havana	Carretera Panamericana, Malecón, Quinta Avenida, 2-400, I-3
Playa del Muerto	Santa Cruz del Norte	Mayabeque	I-3
Boca de Jaruco	Santa Cruz del Norte	Mayabeque	I-3
Santa Cruz del Norte	Santa Cruz del Norte	Mayabeque	I-3
El Fraile	Santa Cruz del Norte	Mayabeque	I-3
Playa Jibacoa	Santa Cruz del Norte	Mayabeque	I-3
Concuní	Santa Cruz del Norte	Mayabeque	I-3
Puerto Libre (to Arcos de Canasí)	Santa Cruz del Norte	Mayabeque	I-3
Batey San Juan	Santa Cruz del Norte	Mayabeque	I-3
Puerto Escondido	Santa Cruz del Norte	Mayabeque	I-3
Bacunayagua	Santa Cruz del Norte	Mayabeque	I-3
Rincón Moderno	Matanzas	Matanzas	I-3
San Roque	Matanzas	Matanzas	I-3
San Valentín	Matanzas	Matanzas	I-3
**Matanzas**	Matanzas	Matanzas	I-3
Canímar	Matanzas	Matanzas	I-3
San Felipe	Matanzas	Matanzas	I-3
El Mamey	Matanzas	Matanzas	I-3
Carbonera	Matanzas	Matanzas	I-3
Boca de Camarioca	Cárdenas	Matanzas	I-3
Julián Alemán	Cárdenas	Matanzas	I-3
Varadero	Cárdenas	Matanzas	I-3
Santa Marta	Cárdenas	Matanzas	I-3
Guásimas	Cárdenas	Matanzas	I-3
Cárdenas	Cárdenas	Matanzas	I-3
El Castillito	Cárdenas	Matanzas	
José Smith Comas	Cárdenas	Matanzas	
Mercedita	Cárdenas	Matanzas	
Máximo Gómez	Perico	Matanzas	
Ategorrieta	Martí	Matanzas	
Martí	Martí	Matanzas	
Itabo	Martí	Matanzas	
Zapato	Martí	Matanzas	
Hoyo Colorado	Martí	Matanzas	
Palma Sola	Corralillo	Villa Clara	
Corralillo	Corralillo	Villa Clara	
Sierra Morena	Corralillo	Villa Clara	
San Vicente	Corralillo	Villa Clara	
La Panchita (crorssroad)	Corralillo	Villa Clara	
Rancho Veloz	Corralillo	Villa Clara	
Quintín Banderas	Corralillo	Villa Clara	
José René Riquelme	Quemado de Güines	Villa Clara	
Quemado de Güines	Quemado de Güines	Villa Clara	
Caguaguas	Quemado de Güines	Villa Clara	
El Mogote (Mogotes de Jumagua)	Sagua la Grande	Villa Clara	
Jumagua (Mogotes de Jumagua)	Sagua la Grande	Villa Clara	
Sagua la Grande	Sagua la Grande	Villa Clara	
Sitiecito	Sagua la Grande	Villa Clara	
Viana	Sagua la Grande	Villa Clara	
Calabazar de Sagua	Encrucijada	Villa Clara	
Encrucijada	Encrucijada	Villa Clara	
La Sierra	Encrucijada	Villa Clara	
Pavón	Camajuaní	Villa Clara	
La Pedrera	Camajuaní	Villa Clara	
Entronque Aguada de Moya	Camajuaní	Villa Clara	
Aguada de Moya	Camajuaní	Villa Clara	
Vueltas	Camajuaní	Villa Clara	
Vega de Palma	Camajuaní	Villa Clara	
Entronque de Vueltas (to Camajuaní)	Camajuaní	Villa Clara	4–321
Taguayabón	Camajuaní	Villa Clara	4–321
Palenque	Camajuaní	Villa Clara	4–321
Remedios		Villa Clara	4–321
Marcelo Salado	Caibarién	Villa Clara	4–321
Caibarién	Caibarién	Villa Clara	4–321
Cambaíto	Caibarién	Villa Clara	
Dolores	Caibarién	Villa Clara	
Seibabo	Yaguajay	Sancti Spíritus	4-123
Yaguajay	Yaguajay	Sancti Spíritus	4-123
Guayabera	Yaguajay	Sancti Spíritus	4-123
Mayajigua	Yaguajay	Sancti Spíritus	4-123
La Legua	Yaguajay	Sancti Spíritus	4-123
Mabuya	Chambas	Ciego de Ávila	5-123
Piedra	Chambas	Ciego de Ávila	5-123
Chambas	Chambas	Ciego de Ávila	5-123
El Calvario	Chambas	Ciego de Ávila	5-123
Falla	Chambas	Ciego de Ávila	5-123
Ranchuelo	Chambas	Ciego de Ávila	5-123
Las Cejas (to Peonia)	Ciro Redondo	Ciego de Ávila	5-123
Morón	Morón	Ciego de Ávila	5-123
Cunagua	Bolivia	Ciego de Ávila	5-123
La Veintiuno	Bolivia	Ciego de Ávila	5-123
Bolivia	Bolivia	Ciego de Ávila	5-123
Mamey (crossroad)	Bolivia	Ciego de Ávila	5-123
Miraflores Nuevo (to Pedro Ballester)	Bolivia	Ciego de Ávila	5-123
Tabor	Esmeralda	Camagüey	5-123
Nuñez	Esmeralda	Camagüey	5-123
Caonao	Esmeralda	Camagüey	5-123
Esmeralda	Esmeralda	Camagüey	5-123
Jiqui	Esmeralda	Camagüey	5-123
Brasil (crossroad)	Esmeralda	Camagüey	5-123
Lombillo (crossroad)	Esmeralda	Camagüey	5-123
Cubitas	Sierra de Cubitas	Camagüey	5-123
Sola	Sierra de Cubitas	Camagüey	5-123
Lugareño (crossroad)	Minas	Camagüey	5-123
Nuevitas (crossroad)	Nuevitas	Camagüey	5-123
San Miguel de Bagá	Nuevitas	Camagüey	5-123
Camalote (crossroad)	Nuevitas	Camagüey	5-123
Manatí	Manatí	Las Tunas	
Dumañuecos (crossroad)	Manatí	Las Tunas	
Marañón	Puerto Padre	Las Tunas	
Pozo Prieto (to Vázquez)	Puerto Padre	Las Tunas	
Puerto Padre	Puerto Padre	Las Tunas	6-123
Aguada del Negro	Puerto Padre	Las Tunas	6-123
Delicias	Puerto Padre	Las Tunas	6-123
Jesús Menéndez	Jesús Menéndez	Las Tunas	6-123
El Canal	Jesús Menéndez	Las Tunas	6-123
Lora	Jesús Menéndez	Las Tunas	6-123
La Yaya	Jesús Menéndez	Las Tunas	6-123
Velasco	Gibara	Holguín	6-123
Uñas	Gibara	Holguín	6-123
Aguas Claras	Holguín	Holguín	6-123, 6-221
Piedra Picada	Holguín	Holguín	6-123, 6-221
**Holguín**	Holguín	Holguín	6-123, 6-221
Los Haticos	Báguanos	Holguín	6-123
Manguito	Báguanos	Holguín	6-123
Báguanos (crossroad)	Báguanos	Holguín	6-123
La Esperanza	Báguanos	Holguín	6-123
El Nispero (to San Germán)	Báguanos	Holguín	6-123
Barajagua (to Marcané)	Cueto	Holguín	6-123
Cueto	Cueto	Holguín	6-123
Santa Isabel de Nipe	Mayarí	Holguín	6-123
Guaro	Mayarí	Holguín	6-123
Juan Vicente	Mayarí	Holguín	6-123
Mayarí	Mayarí	Holguín	6-123
Cajimara	Mayarí	Holguín	6-123
Santa Rita	Mayarí	Holguín	6-123
Nicaro-Levisa	Mayarí	Holguín	6-123
Cabonico	Mayarí	Holguín	6-123
Téneme	Frank País	Holguín	6-123
Playa Tanamo (to Barrederas)	Frank País	Holguín	6-123
Río Grande	Frank País	Holguín	6-123
Cayo Mambí (crossroad)	Frank País	Holguín	6-123
Sagua de Tánamo	Sagua de Tánamo	Holguín	6-123
La Cuchilla	Sagua de Tánamo	Holguín	6-123
Los Indios	Sagua de Tánamo	Holguín	6-123
Centeno	Moa	Holguín	6-123
Moa	Moa	Holguín	6-123
Punta Gorda	Moa	Holguín	6-123
Cañete	Moa	Holguín	6-123
Yamanigüey	Moa	Holguín	6-123
Jaragua	Baracoa	Guantánamo	6-123
Santa María	Baracoa	Guantánamo	6-123
Vega de Taco	Baracoa	Guantánamo	6-123
Nibujón	Baracoa	Guantánamo	6-123
Cayogüín	Baracoa	Guantánamo	6-123
Paso de Toa	Baracoa	Guantánamo	6-123
Mabujabo	Baracoa	Guantánamo	6-123
Baracoa	Baracoa	Guantánamo	6-123

== See also ==
- Roads in Cuba
- Circuito Sur
