= Vía Blanca =

Highway in Cuba

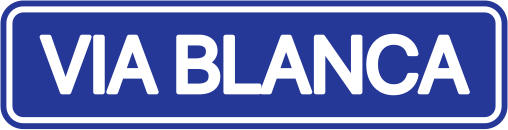
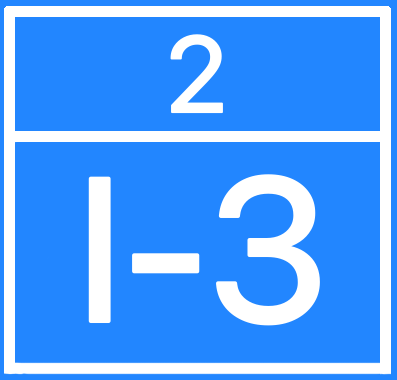
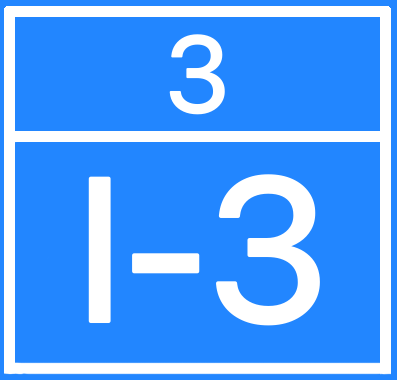
Route number Sign commonly used Vía Blanca
- White Road
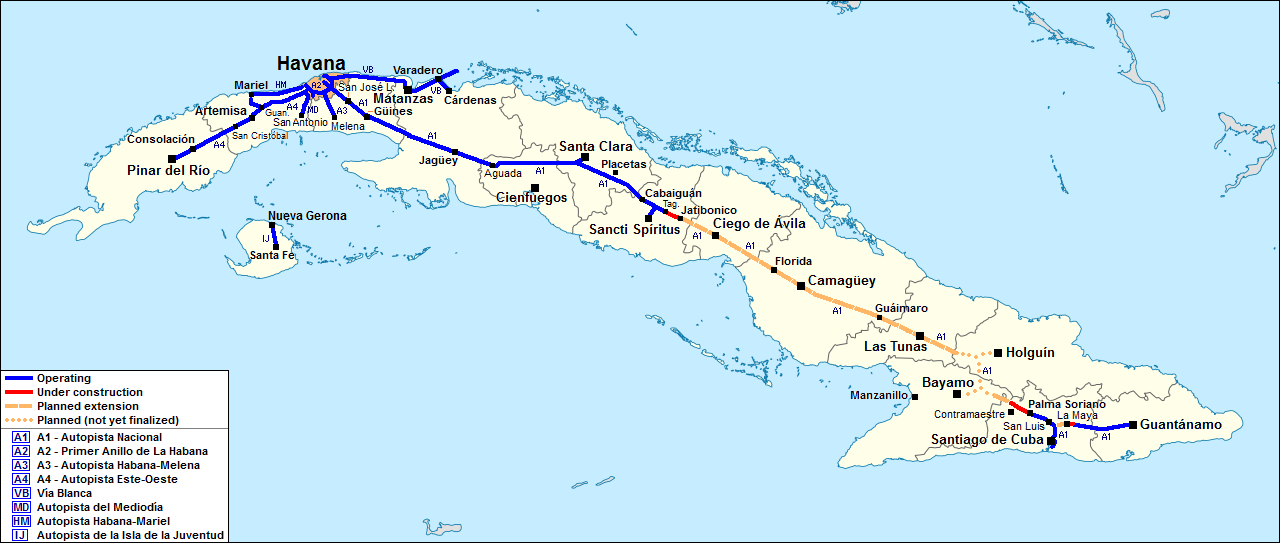
- Map of the Cuban motorway network

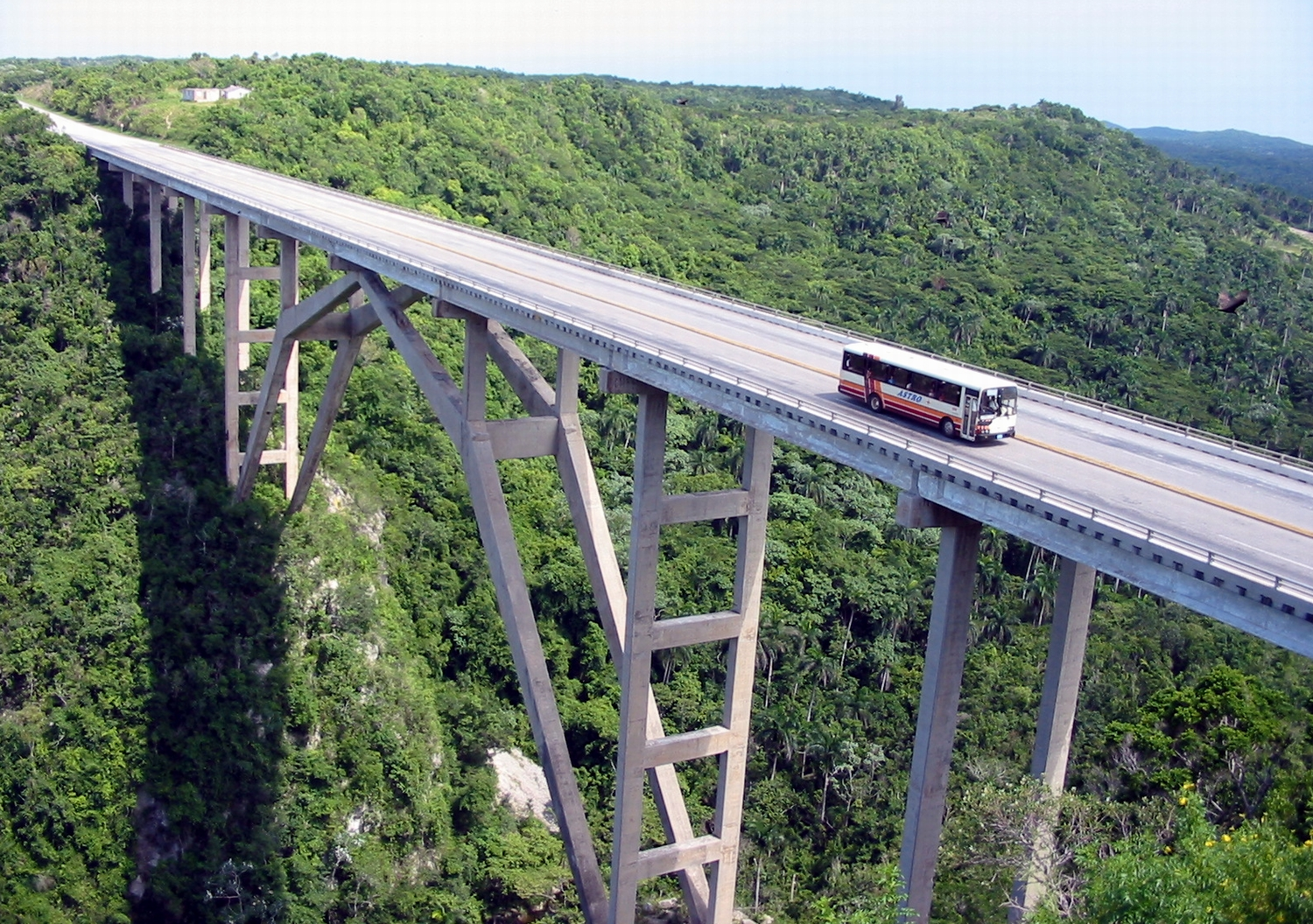
- Bacunayagua Bridge (Puente de Bacunayagua)

Route information
- Length: 150 km (93 mi) 136 km (motorway)
- Existed: 1960–present

Major junctions
- West end: Havana
- East end: Cárdenas

Location
- Country: Cuba
- Major cities: Havana, Santa Cruz del Norte, Matanzas, Varadero, Cárdenas

Highway system
- Roads in Cuba

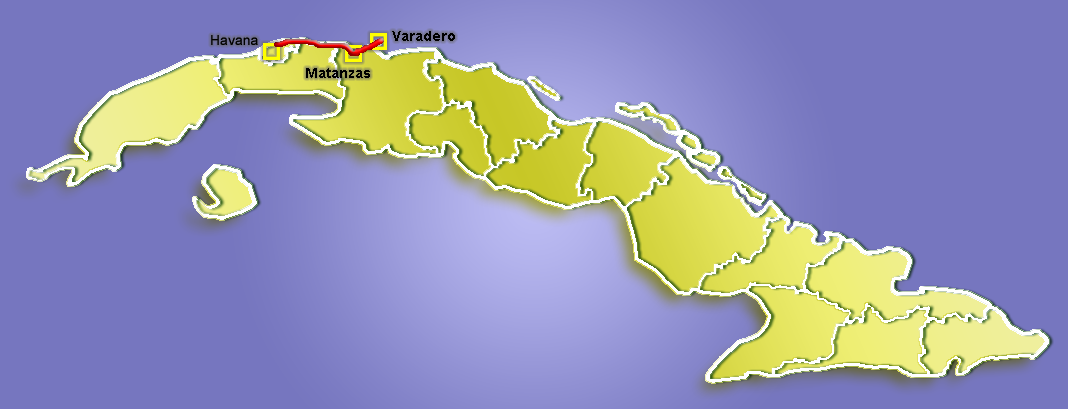
Cuban map highlighting the Vía Blanca

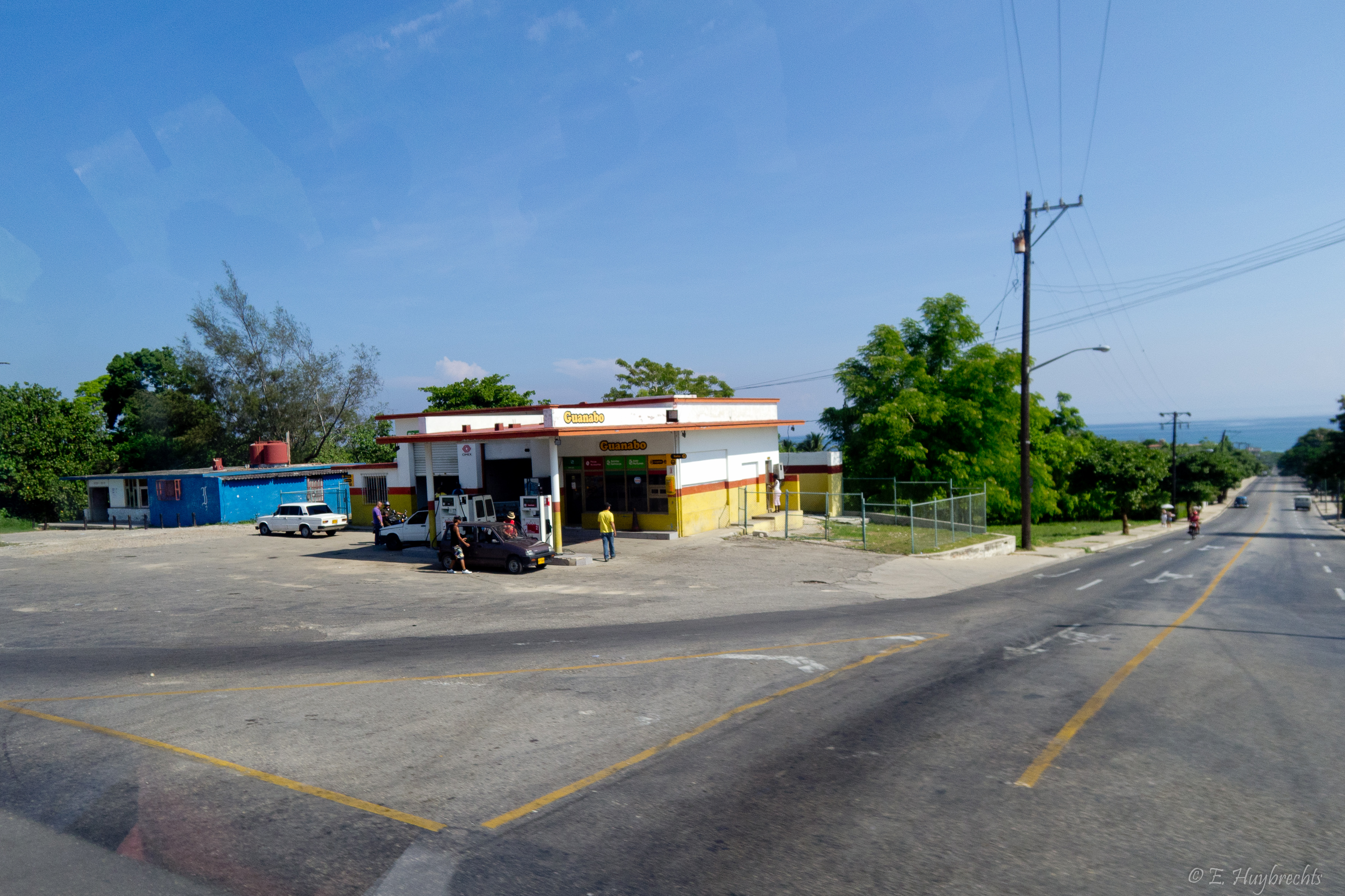
A rest area in Guanabo, Havana

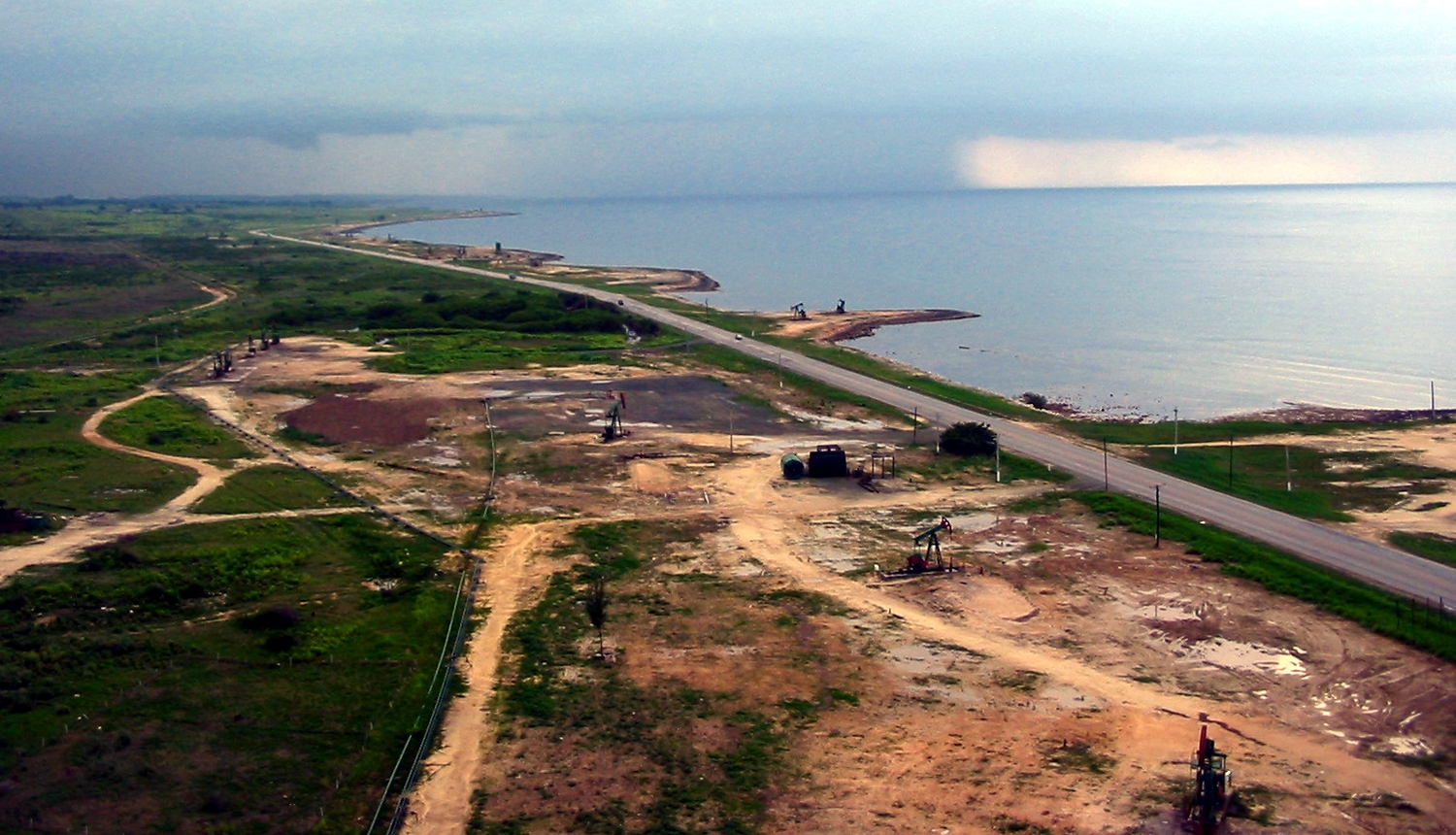
Passing through Boca de Jaruco oil field

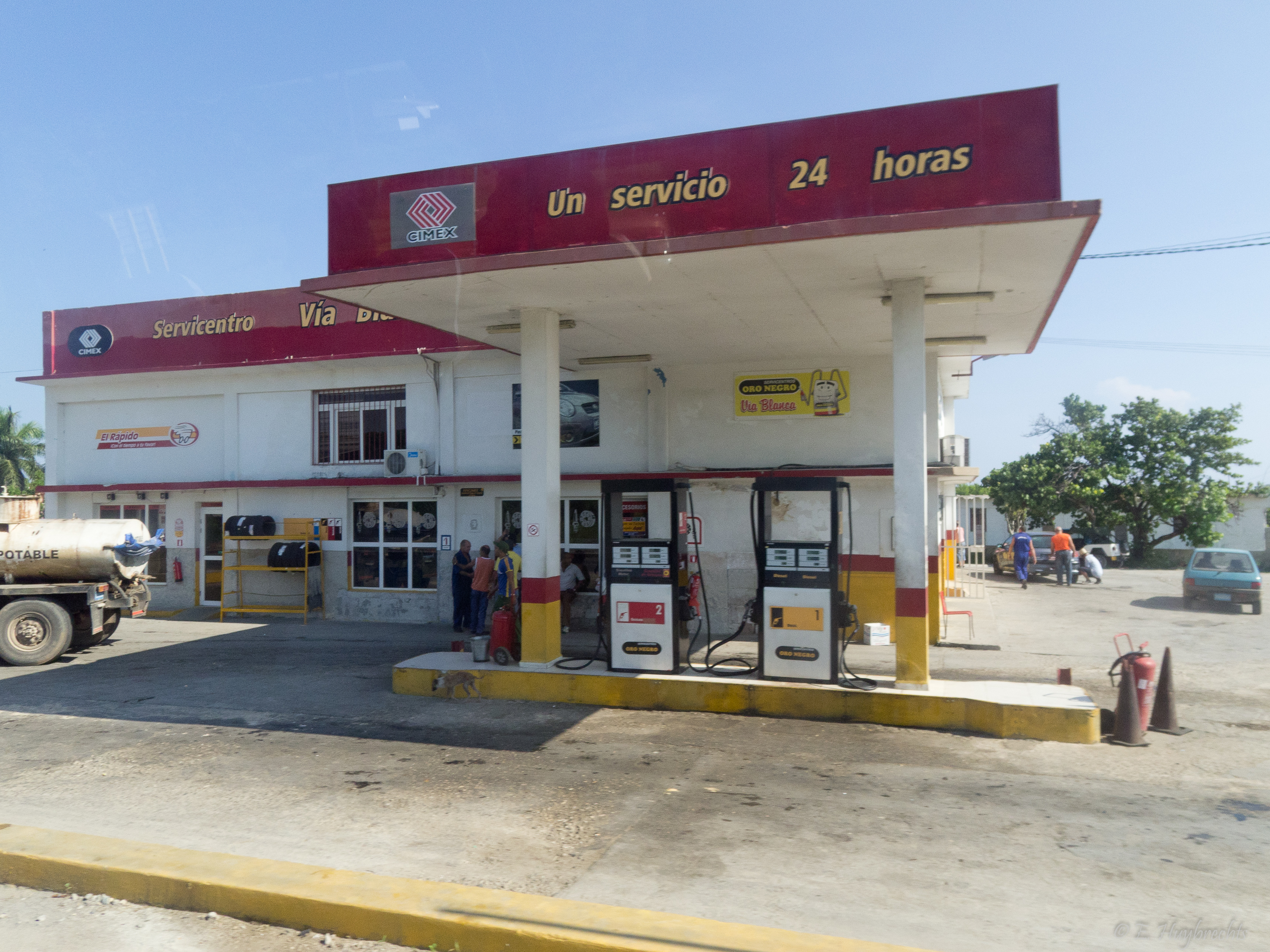
A rest area in Santa Cruz del Norte

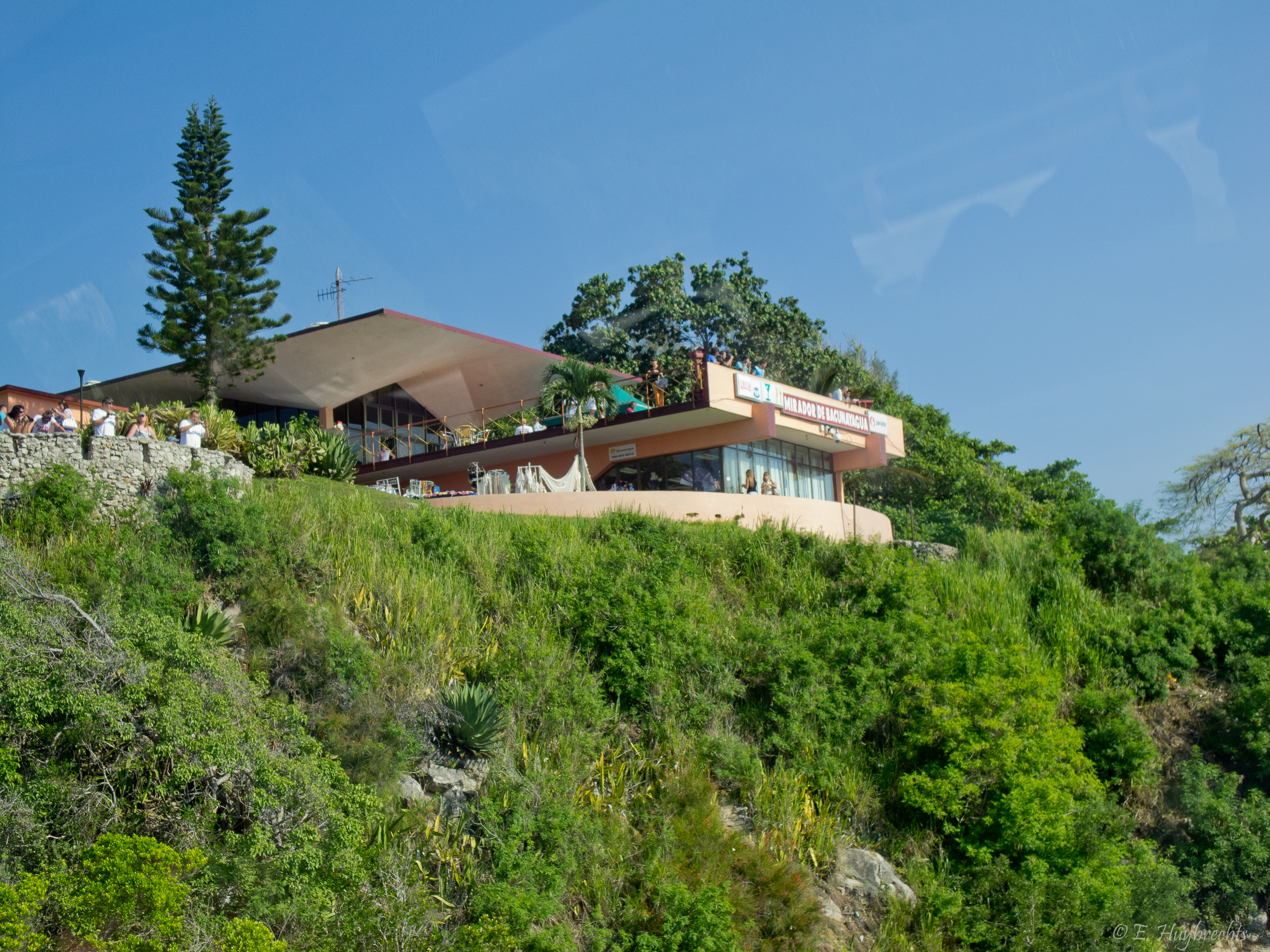
The Mirador de Bacunayagua over Bacunayagua Bridge

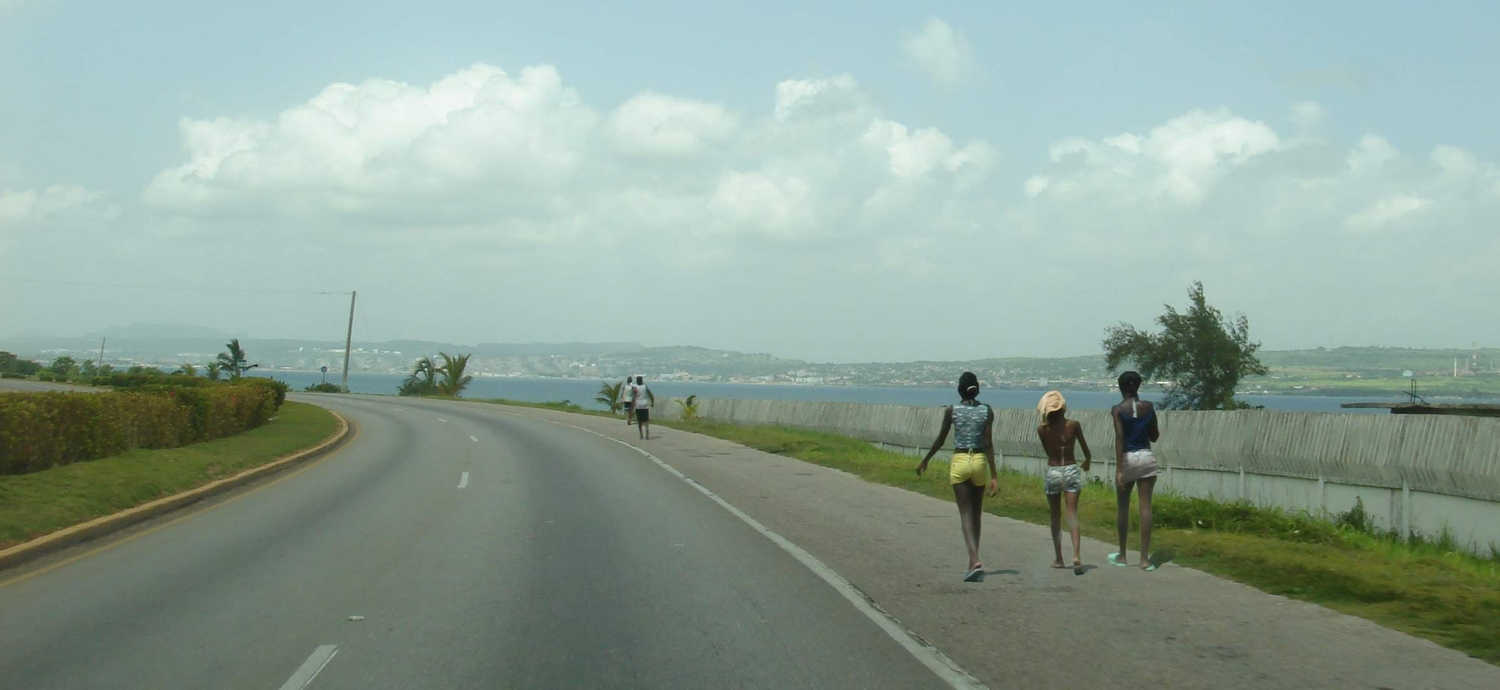
The motorway in Matanzas

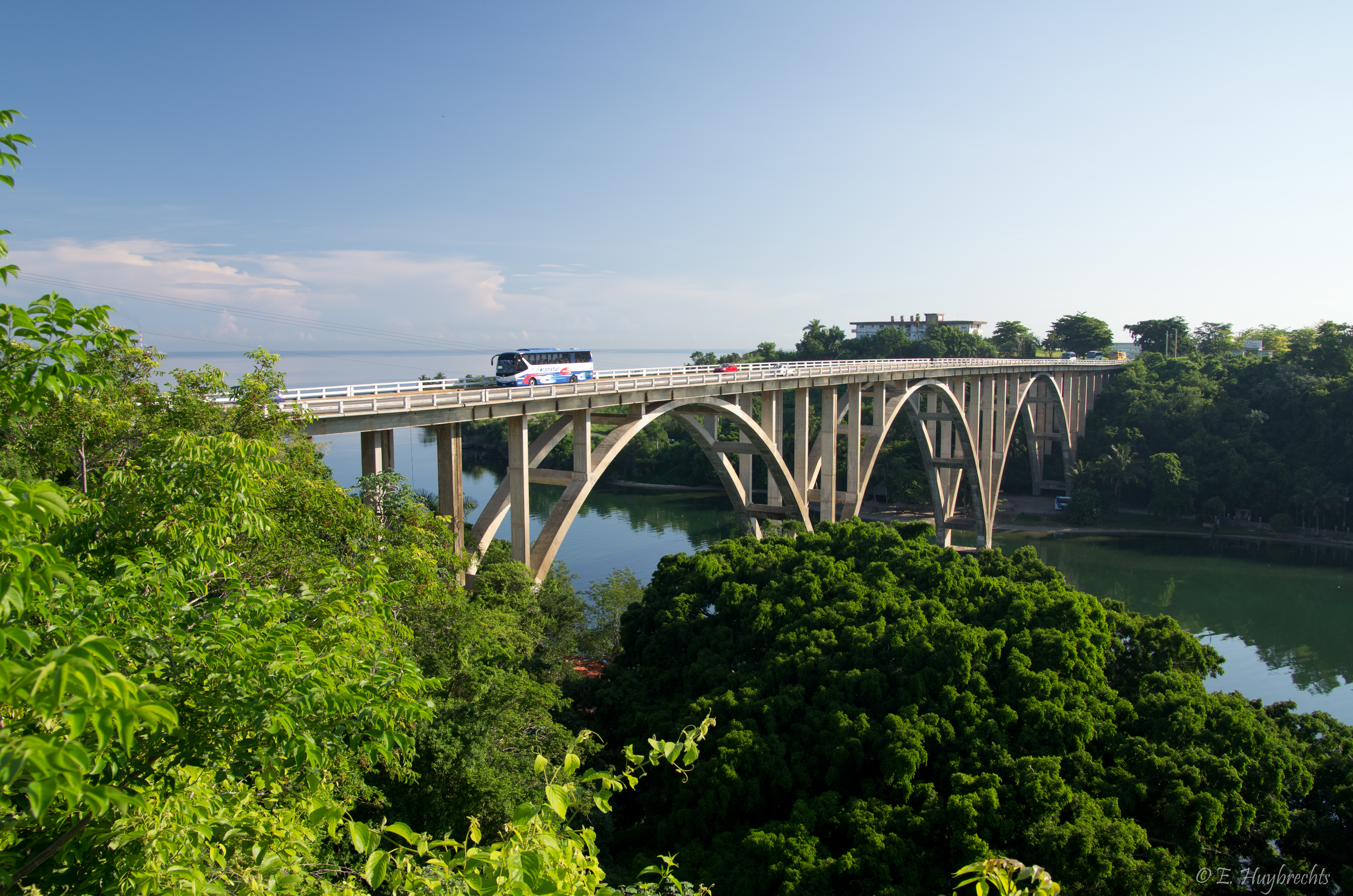
The Canímar Bridge (Puente de Canímar) in Matanzas

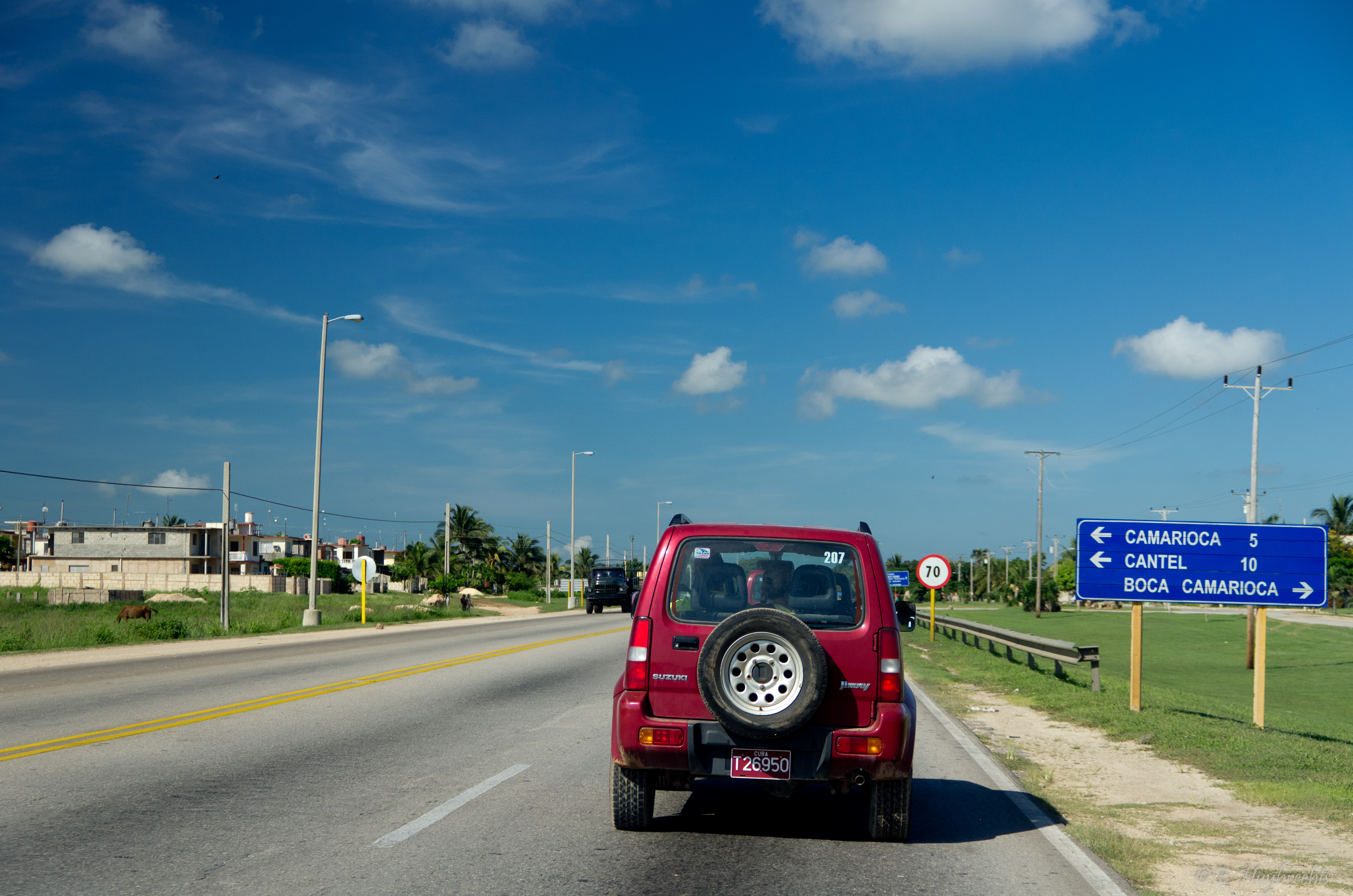
The motorway in Boca de Camarioca

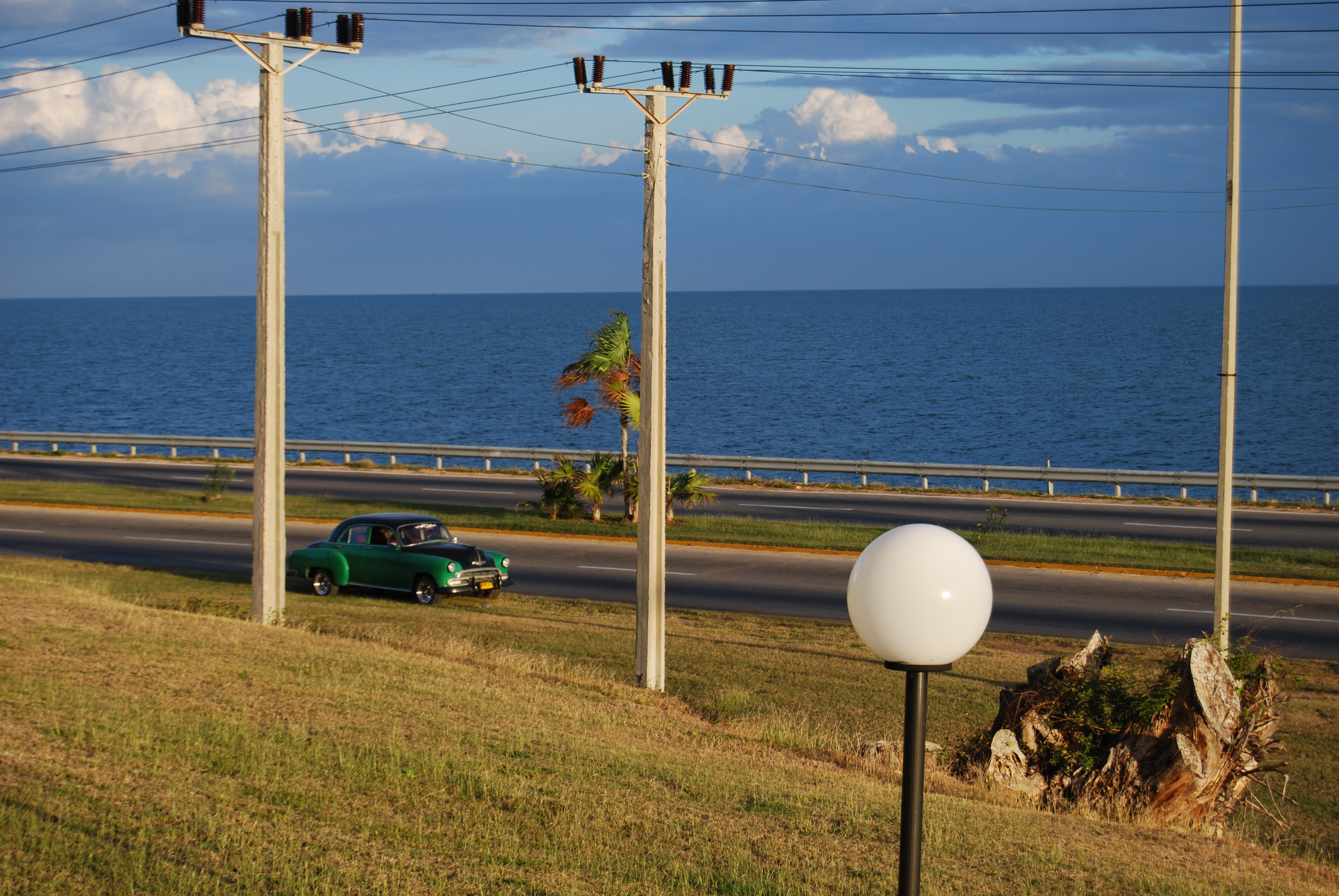
The motorway near Varadero

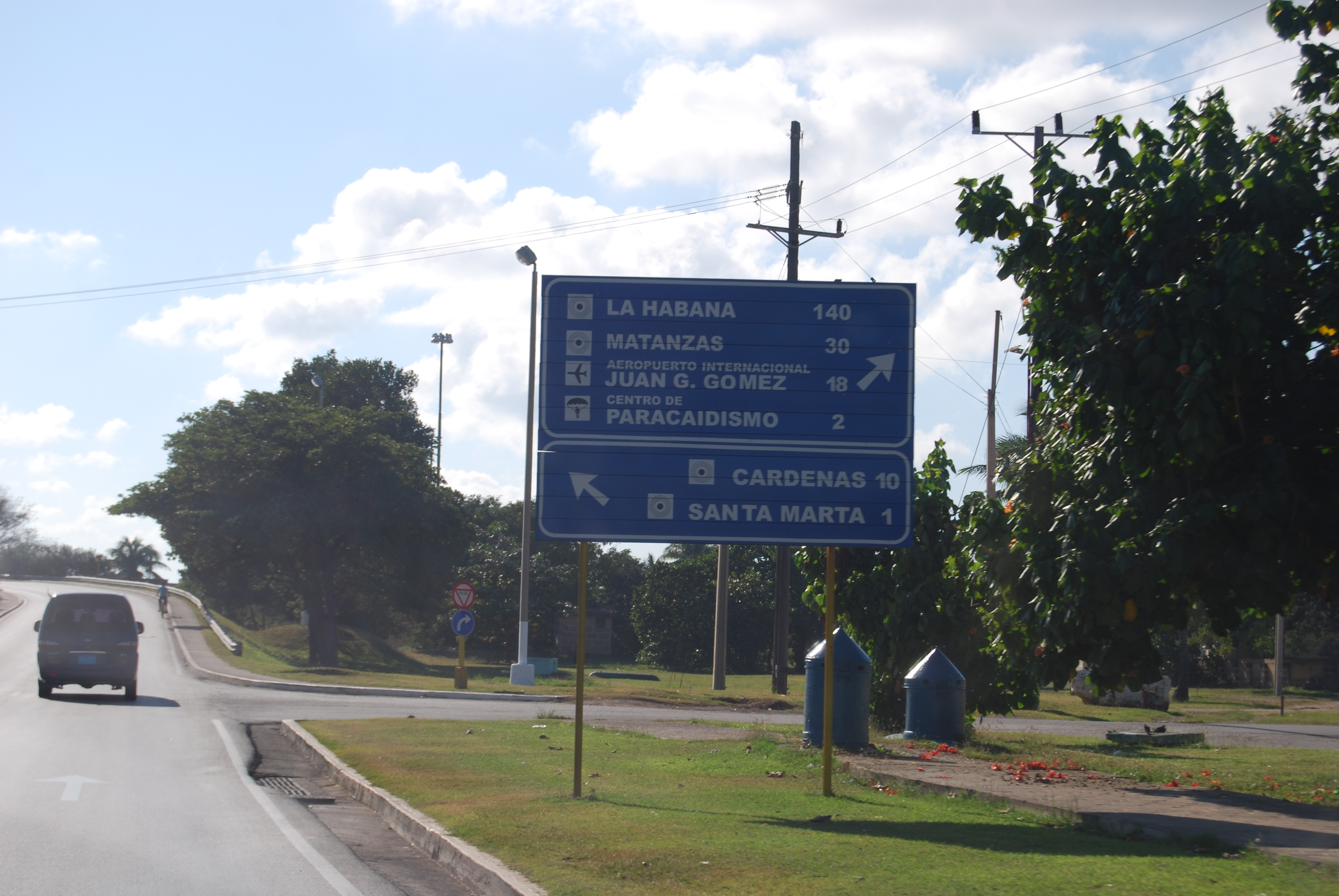
The motorway southwest of Varadero

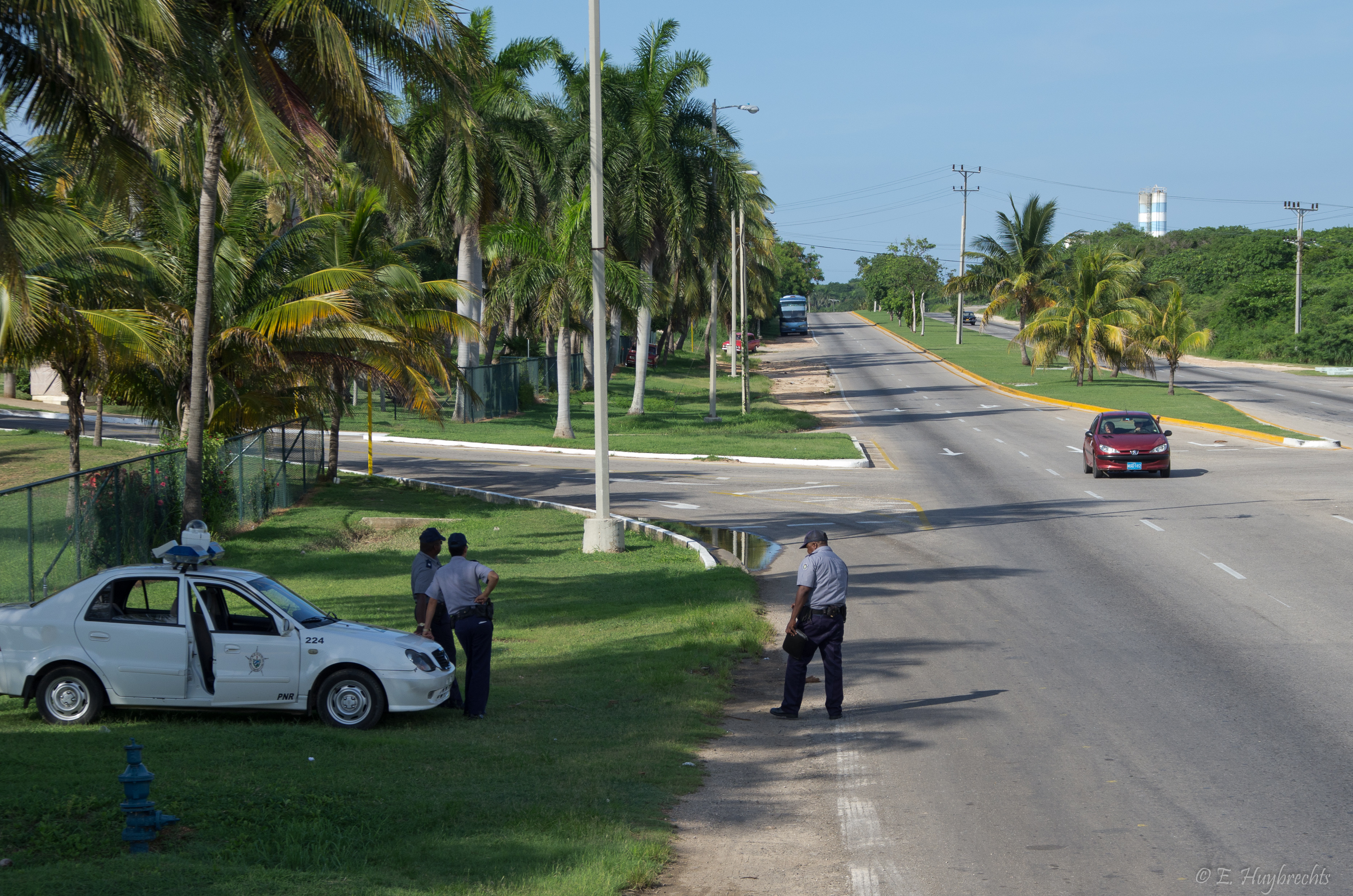
A police patrol on the city beltway of Varadero (Autopista Sur)

Vía Blanca (I-3) is a highway in northern Cuba, connecting the capital city of Havana and the city of Matanzas. A second section extends eastwards from Matanzas to the tourist town of Varadero and to Cárdenas. Even if it is a motorway (autopista), it is part of the national highway named "Circuito Norte" (CN).

== History ==
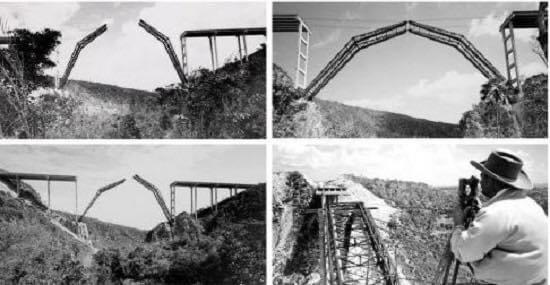
Bridge being constructed

The motorway, connected to the A2 (Havana Ring Road), was opened in 1960. Its construction begun in 1945 with the bridge of Bacunayagua, on the Mayabeque/Matanzas province border. This is the highest Cuban bridge and was completed in 1960.

== Route ==
=== Overview ===
It is mostly a four lane highway, with some divided sections. It runs east-west for 85 km between Havana and Matanzas, crossing the town of Santa Cruz del Norte, and an additional 53 km east to Varadero, at the northern tip of Peninsula de Hicacos (the section between Matanzas and Varadero is a toll road). Most of the highway runs along the Straits of Florida shoreline. This is one of the busiest highways in Cuba, as it joins the two tourist destinations of Havana and Varadero.

=== Description ===
Vía Blanca starts at the Ciudad Deportiva, on the south-western side of Havana, between Cerro and Diez de Octubre. It runs for 12 km through Luyanó and Old Havana border, the harbour area, Regla and Guanabacoa, before crossing the Vía Monumental in Habana del Este. A brief section in Luyanó includes the route of the Carretera Central highway.

The motorway-type section (138 kilometres (86 mi)) starts in Havana, on a roundabout (Rotonda de Cojímar) before the Monumental, and ends north of Cárdenas. In Matanzas city center it crosses the seafront. It is a dual carriageway road, with four lanes for almost the entire route, but there are six lanes for a short section in east Havana. It has some at-grade intersections with rural roads. The exit at Varadero is the starting point of an 18-km long beltway, named Autopista Sur ("South Motorway"), that runs through the town.

The table below shows the exits of the motorway-type section of the Vía Blanca:

AUTOPISTA "VÍA BLANCA"
Exit	↓km↓	Province	Note
Habana Redonda Cojímar	0.0	Havana	
A2 (Nacional) – Túnel	1.2	Havana	Interchange; Via Blanca eastbound exit only to A2 southbound; signed as "heavy equipment over 3500 kg" on eastbound exit
Habana Alamar	3.3	Havana	
Habana Bacuranao-Celimar	7.0	Havana	
Habana Tarará	10.7	Havana	
Habana Mégano	11.6	Havana	
Habana Santa María del Mar	12.4	Havana	
Rest area "Guanabo"	16.9	Mayabeque	
Habana Guanabo	17.0	Havana	
Rest area	18.0	Havana	
Habana Peñas Altas-Veneciana (to Guanabo East)	19.6	Havana	
Habana Brisas del Mar	20.5	Havana	
Playa del Muerto (Boca de Jaruco Oil Field)	26.2	Mayabeque	
Boca de Jaruco	31.4	Mayabeque	
Termoeléctrica de Santa Cruz (restricted access - employees only)	39.2	Mayabeque	
Santa Cruz del Norte	41.5	Mayabeque	
Rest area "Servicentro Vía Blanca"	42.7	Mayabeque	
Santa Cruz del Norte-Jaruco (Camilo Cienfuegos - to San José de las Lajas)	42.8	Mayabeque	
El Fraile	47.5	Mayabeque	
Playa Jibacoa	50.3	Mayabeque	
Concuní	52.5	Mayabeque	
Rest area "Quiosco Guarapiña Gil Alberto"	56.5	Mayabeque	
Arcos de Canasí-Puerto Libre (to Playa Jibacoa)	57.8	Mayabeque	
Batey San Juan	60.3	Mayabeque	
Puerto Escondido	64.2	Mayabeque	
Bacunayagua	66.7	Mayabeque	
Mirador de Bacunayagua (overlooking point of Bacunayagua Bridge)	69.1	Mayabeque	
Puente de Bacunayagua	69.2	Mayabeque; Matanzas	
Bacunayagua Este	71.8	Matanzas	
Rincón Moderno	74.9	Matanzas	
Rest area "Restaurante La Criolla"	77.9	Matanzas	
Valle del Yumurí (San Roque - San Valentín)	83.4	Matanzas	
Matanzas Puerto	87.0	Matanzas	
Matanzas Versalles	88.2	Matanzas	
Matanzas Centro	89.1	Matanzas	
Matanzas La Playa	90.6	Matanzas	
Matanzas Calle 129-Cuevas de Bellamar	91.6	Matanzas	CC route
Matanzas Peñas Altas	93.5	Matanzas	CC route
Matanzas Reynold García	95.7	Matanzas	
Matanzas Universidad	97.0	Matanzas	
Canímar	97.8	Matanzas	
Puente de Canímar	98.1	Matanzas	
San Felipe	98.3	Matanzas	
Escuela Militar Camilo Cienfuegos (restricted access - FAR military school)	39.2	Matanzas	
El Mamey	99.5	Matanzas	
Carbonera-Aeropuerto J.G.Gómez (to Cueva de Saturno)	106.0	Matanzas	
Boca de Camarioca-Camarioca	115.0	Matanzas	
Boca de Camarioca	116.0	Matanzas	
Julián Alemán	118.0	Matanzas	
Toll plaza	118.5	Matanzas	
Varadero-Playa Caleta	121.0	Matanzas	
Varadero ( 18-km beltway to Varadero town center)	124.0	Matanzas	
Santa Marta	125.0	Matanzas	
Santa Marta Parque Industrial	127.0	Matanzas	
Guásimas-Humberto Álvarez	129.0	Matanzas	
Cárdenas Cementerio	135.0	Matanzas	
Cárdenas Brisas del Mar (Cárdenas City Hospital)	136.0	Matanzas	
Cárdenas Centro	138.0	Matanzas	
Vía Blanca – Varadero City Beltway (Autopista Sur)
Exit	↓km↓	Province	Note
Varadero–Vía Blanca (main route)	0.0	Matanzas	
Varadero Oeste	0.5	Matanzas	
Varadero Calle 17-Isla del Sur	1.0	Matanzas	
Varadero Calle 24	1.5	Matanzas	
Varadero Calle 30	2.0	Matanzas	
Varadero Calle 36-Terminal de Ómnibus	2.5	Matanzas	
Varadero Parque Central	3.3	Matanzas	
Varadero Parque Josone	4.1	Matanzas	
Varadero Avenida Primera	5.0	Matanzas	
Varadero Calle K	6.6	Matanzas	
Varadero Golf Club	8.6	Matanzas	
Varadero Plaza America	9.2	Matanzas	
Varadero Sol Elite Palmeras	10.0	Matanzas	
Varadero Bella Vista	10.6	Matanzas	
Varadero Ocean Vista	10.9	Matanzas	
Varadero Naviti Beach Club	11.1	Matanzas	
Varadero Arena Doradas/British Caribe	12.1	Matanzas	
Varadero Muthu Playa/Turquesa	12.5	Matanzas	
Varadero Delfinarium	13.1	Matanzas	
Varadero Camino Milián	13.6	Matanzas	
Varadero Aguas Azules	14.0	Matanzas	
Varadero Hicacos	14.3	Matanzas	
Varadero Varahicacos	15.6	Matanzas	
Varadero Memories	16.5	Matanzas	
Varadero Meliá Península	17.1	Matanzas	
Varadero Meliá Marina	18.0	Matanzas	

== See also ==
- Roads in Cuba
- Carretera Central
- Transport in Cuba
- Infrastructure of Cuba
