= List of bridges in Cuba =

== Historical bridges ==
	Name	Distinction	Length	Type	Carries Crosses	Opened	Location	Province	Ref.
1	Yayabo Bridge	One of the oldest bridge in Cuba; National Heritage of Cuba (1995)	85 m (279 ft)	Masonry; 5 arches	Yayabo River	1831	Sancti Spíritus; 21°55′25.4″N 79°26′39.7″W	Sancti Spíritus Province	
2	Matanzas Swing Bridge			Truss; Steel; Swing bridge	San Juan River	1903	Matanzas; 23°02′42.2″N 81°34′21.9″E	Matanzas Province	

== Major bridges ==
	Name	Span	Length	Type	Carries Crosses	Opened	Location	Province	Ref.
1	Bacunayagua Bridge	114 m (374 ft)	313 m (1,027 ft)	Arch; Concrete deck arch	Vía Blanca; Yumurí River	1960	Bacunayagua; 23°07′56.4″N 81°40′49.4″W	Mayabeque Province; Matanzas Province	
2	Canimar Bridge	66 m (217 ft)	290 m (950 ft)	Arch; 3 concrete deck arches	Vía Blanca; Canímar River	1951	Matanzas; 23°02′20.9″N 81°29′48.7″E	Matanzas Province	

== See also ==
- Transport in Cuba
