= Camilo Cienfuegos (Santa Cruz del Norte) =

Camilo Cienfuegos Hershey
- Village
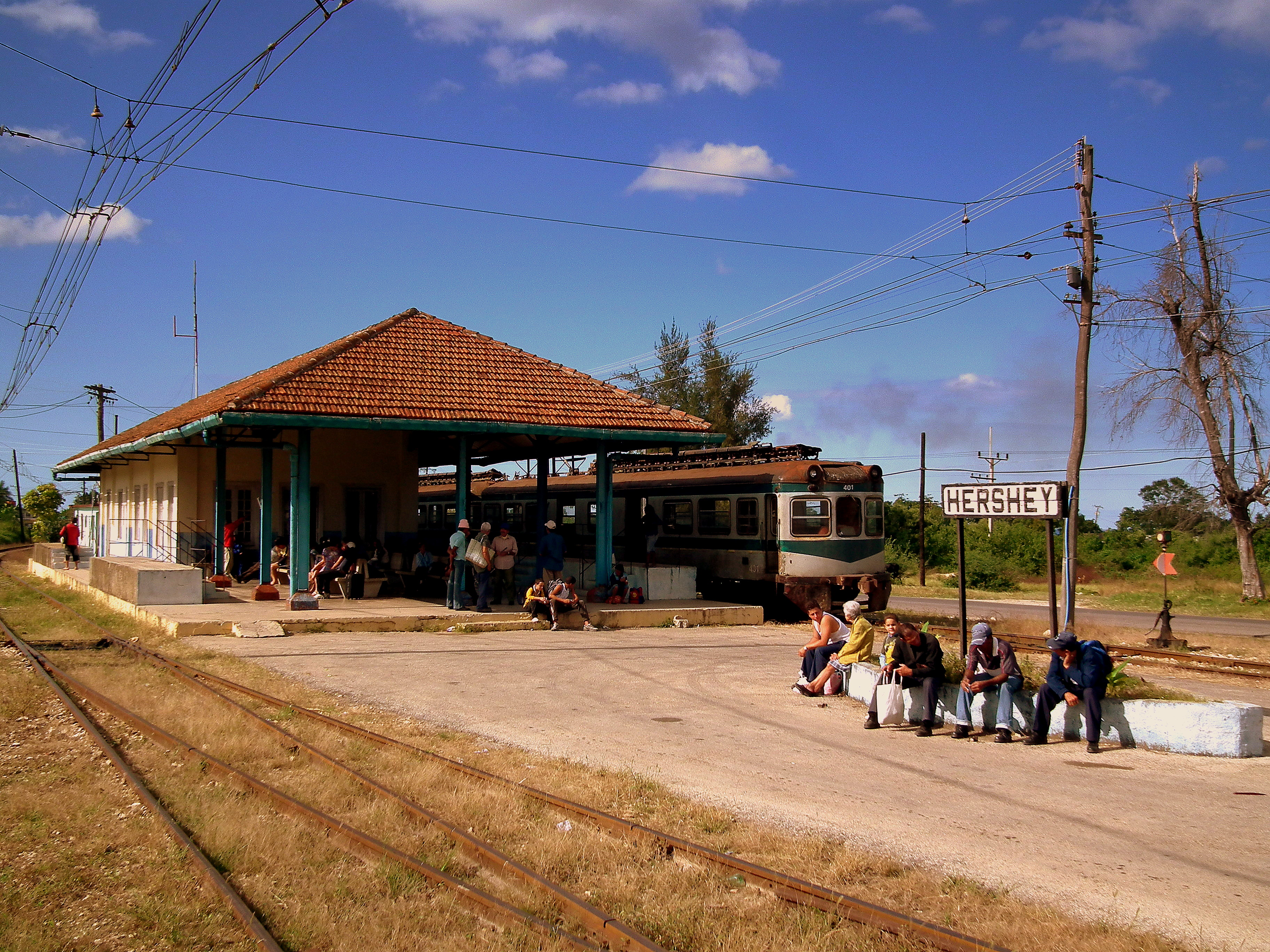
- Hershey railway station

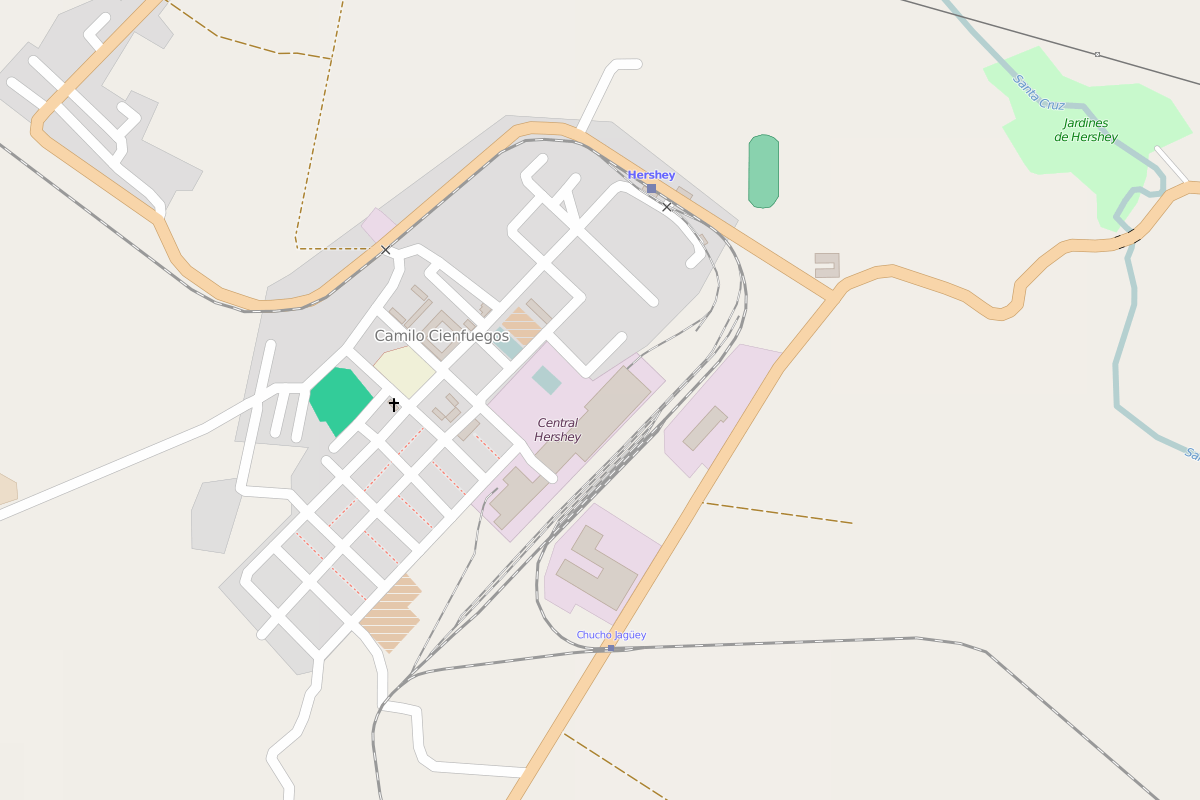
- OSM map of Hershey

- Location of Hershey in Cuba
- Coordinates: 23°07′45″N 81°56′31″W
- Country: Cuba
- Province: Mayabeque
- Municipality: Santa Cruz del Norte
- Founded: 1916
- Elevation: 113 m (371 ft)

Population (2012)
  - Total: 3,040
- Time zone: UTC-5 (EST)

Hershey (officially known as Camilo Cienfuegos) is a Cuban village and consejo popular ("popular council", i.e. hamlet) of the municipality of Santa Cruz del Norte, in Mayabeque Province.

== History ==
Milton Hershey, the famous American chocolatier and businessman, visited Cuba in 1916. Hershey decided to buy sugar plantations and mills in Cuba to supply the growing Pennsylvania-based Hershey Company. He built an adjoining town for the workers and their families to live, which he named Hershey.

The village grew to 160 homes and had high standards of living, a public school, medical clinic, stores, a movie theater, and a golf course. There is also a baseball stadium where a team sponsored by the Hershey Company played home games. The factory was one of the most productive sugar refineries in Cuba and Latin America. The Hershey Company sold their holdings in Cuba in 1948.

Hershey was renamed after the Cuban Revolution in honor of Camilo Cienfuegos. The sugar refinery was nationalized, wages were lowered, and the golf course was demolished. The mill was closed in 2002 under the pretense that the factory had become inefficient.

Residents still refer to the town as Hershey (pronounced as her-see) and Hershey signs still hang at the town's train station.

== Geography ==
Hershey, located between the cities of Havana and Matanzas, is 3 km from Santa Cruz del Norte and the Atlantic coast. Other nearby villages are La Sierra, Jibacoa, San Antonio del Río Blanco, and Loma de Travieso.

The village has a station on the main line of the Hershey Electric Railway, with a branch to Jaruco, and is 5 km from the "Vía Blanca" highway that connects Havana to Varadero.

== See also ==
- Arcos de Canasí
- Bacunayagua
- Boca de Jaruco
