= Boca de Jaruco =

- Village
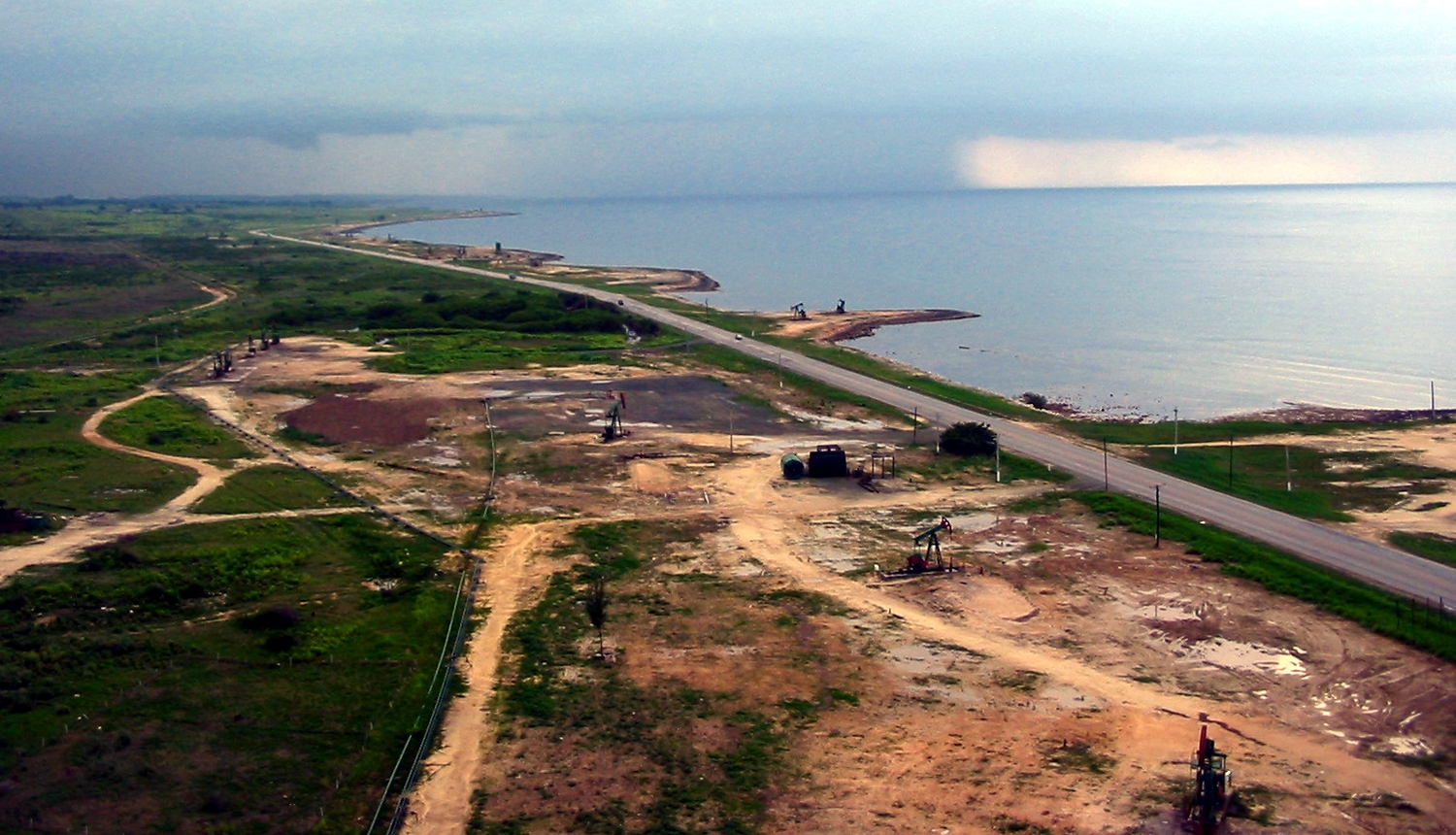
- Oil field in Boca de Jaruco

- Location of Boca de Jaruco in Cuba
- Coordinates: 23°10′35″N 82°00′44″W
- Country: Cuba
- Province: Mayabeque
- Municipality: Santa Cruz del Norte
- Elevation: 5 m (16 ft)

Population (2012)
  - Total: 1,339
- Time zone: UTC-5 (EST)
- Area code: +53-47

Boca de Jaruco (English: Mouth of Jaruco) is a small fishing village in the Mayabeque Province of Cuba. It is located in the municipality of Santa Cruz del Norte, at the mouth of the Rio Jaruco, on the Straits of Florida.

== Overview ==
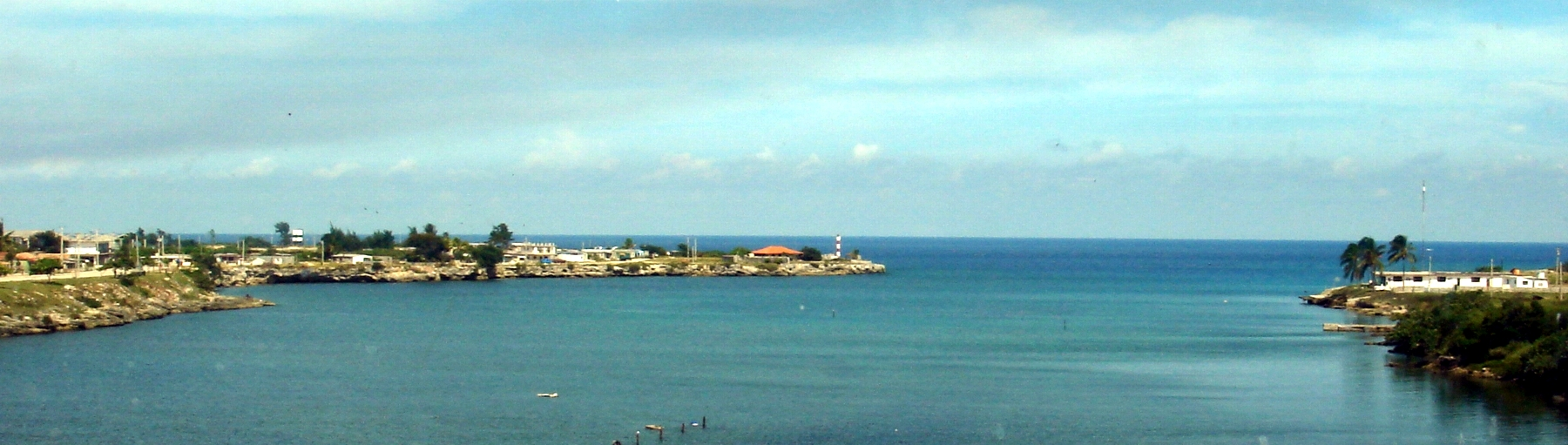
The village at the mouth of Jaruco River

An extensive oil field was developed west of the village; hundreds of wells were drilled in the 1970s and 1980s by the Cuban national oil company Cupet in cooperation with Soviet technicians. The oil pumps (many no longer operational) can be seen on either side of the Via Blanca highway as it passes through Boca de Jaruco.

The wells are managed by the Russian Zarubezhneft and the Cuban Cubapetroleo. The Russian Prime Minister Dmitry Medvedev visited the site in October 2019, where Zarubezhneft was planning to invest 100 million euros to drill 30 wells in two years in a move to reduce Cuba's dependence on oil imports. The first horizontal well of this project was drilled in September 2020.

== See also ==
- Jibacoa
- Arcos de Canasí
- Bacunayagua
- Camilo Cienfuegos (Hershey)
