= Oribe (hairdresser) =

Cuban-born American hairstylist (1956–2018)

- Born: Oribe Canales; September 13, 1956; Jaruco, Cuba
- Died: December 17, 2018 (aged 62)
- Occupations: Hairdresser, businessman
- Years active: 1976–2018
- Website: www.oribe.com

Oribe Canales (September 13, 1956 – December 17, 2018), known professionally as Oribe, (Note: His name is pronounced oh-REE-beh, because it is a Spanish name, but the brand is pronounced or-BAY, because when he moved to the US, people in his hometown struggled to say it properly and the mispronunciation stuck.) was a Cuban-born American hairstylist. He styled models' hair at fashion shows for brands such as Versace, Thierry Mugler, Calvin Klein, and Chanel. Oribe was also known for having given a new look to supermodels such as Linda Evangelista and Cindy Crawford.

== Early life ==
Oribe was born in Jaruco, Cuba, on September 13, 1956, and emigrated to the United States with his family in 1962. They settled in Charlotte, North Carolina.

== Career ==
In 1976, Oribe moved to New York City. It was while working at the Garren at the Plaza salon that Oribe received his first editorial credit, from the magazine GQ. He then started working with photographer Steven Meisel and makeup artist François Nars.

In 1987, Oribe established his first salon in New York City's Upper West Side. In 1990, he opened a salon on the 10th floor of the Elizabeth Arden salon, on Fifth Avenue in New York City, after having been introduced to the cosmetics company by the model Vendela.

== Death ==
He died on December 17, 2018, aged 62.
