= Jaruco Municipal Museum =

Museum in Cuba

- Museo Municipal de Jaruco
- Established: 30 December 1980
- Location: Jaruco, Cuba
- Coordinates: 23.04554°N 82.01233°W

Jaruco Municipal Museum is a museum located in the 32nd street in Jaruco, Cuba. It was established on 30 December 1980.

The museum holds collections on history, weaponry, decorative arts and numismatics.

== See also ==
- List of museums in Cuba
