= Arcos de Canasí =

- Village
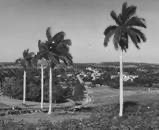
- Arcos de Canasí in 1895

- Location of Arcos de Canasí in Cuba
- Coordinates: 23°06′45″N 81°46′46″W
- Country: Cuba
- Province: Mayabeque
- Municipality: Santa Cruz del Norte

Area
  - Total: 0.4058 km^{2} (0.1567 sq mi)
- Elevation: 5 m (16 ft)

Population (2012)
  - Total: 1,810
- Time zone: UTC-5 (EST)
- Area code: +53-47

Arcos de Canasí Bacunayagya is a Cuban village and consejo popular ("people's council", i.e. hamlet) of the municipality of Santa Cruz del Norte, in Mayabeque Province. Until 2011, it was part of the former La Habana Province.

== History ==
The town was founded in 1738 at the mouths of the Rio Canasi. Due to frequent flooding, the town was moved to higher ground in 1808, on the actual location.

It was its own municipality (administering an area of 125 square kilometres (48 sq mi)) of the Matanzas Province until 1976, when its territories were re-distributed to the Santa Cruz del Norte municipality of the La Habana Province. With the split of the La Habana Province in 2010, this municipality belongs currently to Mayabeque Province.

== Economy ==
The town's economy is mainly agriculture. Farmers offering cheese and fruit on the side of the Via Blanca highway are an everyday sight.

Intense oil exploitation is active on the coast of the Atlantic Ocean just north of the town.

== See also ==
- Jibacoa
- Bacunayagua
- Boca de Jaruco
- Camilo Cienfuegos (Hershey)
