= Santa Cruz del Norte Municipal Museum =

Museum in Cuba

- Museo Municipal de Santa Cruz del Norte
- Established: 28 January 1982
- Location: Santa Cruz del Norte, Cuba

Santa Cruz del Norte Municipal Museum is a museum located in 11th avenue in Santa Cruz del Norte, Cuba. It was established on 28 January 1982.

The museum holds collections on history, weaponry, archeology and ethnology.

== See also ==
- List of museums in Cuba
