= Jesús Menéndez, Cuba =

Jesús Menéndez
- Municipality
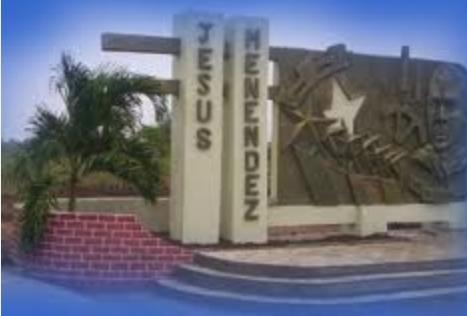

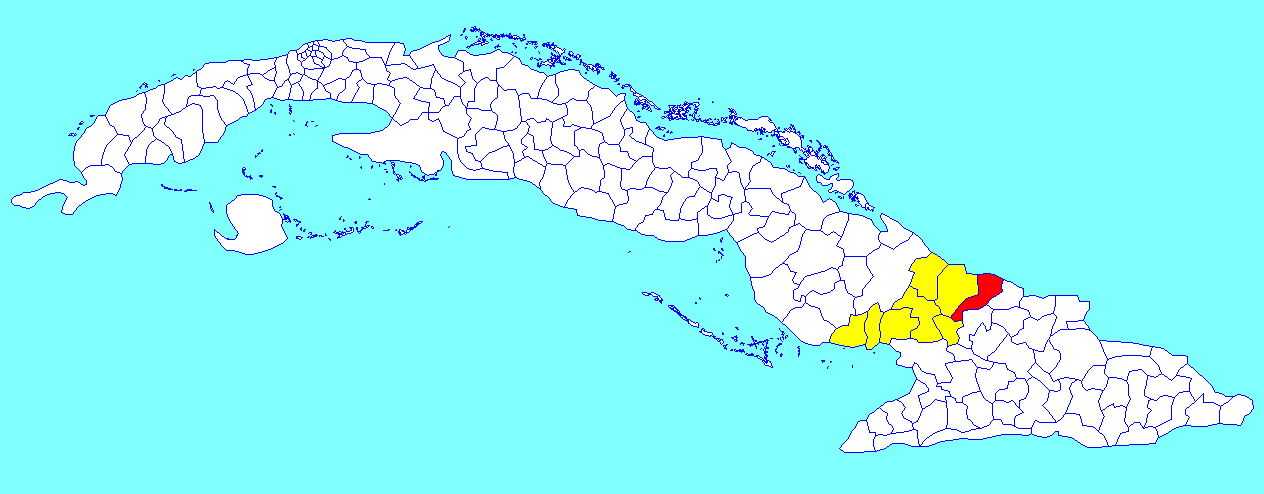
- Jesús Menéndez municipality (red) within Las Tunas Province (yellow) and Cuba
- Coordinates: 21°09′48″N 76°28′39″W
- Country: Cuba
- Province: Las Tunas

Area
  - Total: 638 km^{2} (246 sq mi)
- Elevation: 5 m (16 ft)

Population (2022)
  - Total: 46,729
  - Density: 73.2/km^{2} (190/sq mi)
- Time zone: UTC-5 (EST)
- Area code: +53-31
- Website: https://www.chaparra.gob.cu/

Jesús Menéndez also known as Chaparra is a municipality and town in the Las Tunas Province of Cuba. It was named after the Cuban trade unionist Jesús Menéndez Larrondo.

== Demographics ==
In 2022, the municipality of Jesús Menéndez had a population of 46,729. With a total area of 638 km^{2} (246 sq mi), it has a population density of 73/km^{2} (190/sq mi).

== See also ==
- Municipalities of Cuba
- List of cities in Cuba
