= Jibacoa =

Village in Habana Province, Cuba

Jibacoa Playa Jibacoa
- Village
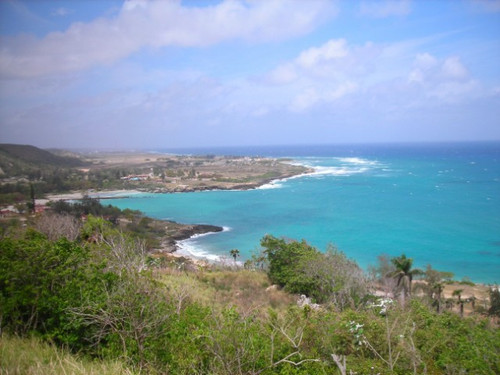

- Location of Jibacoa in Cuba
- Coordinates: 23°09′15″N 81°55′02″W
- Country: Cuba
- Province: Mayabeque
- Municipality: Santa Cruz del Norte
- Elevation: 5 m (16 ft)

Population (2012)
  - Total: 1,312
- Time zone: UTC-5 (EST)
- Area code: +53-47

Jibacoa, or more properly Playa Jibacoa, is a fishing village in the Mayabeque Province of Cuba. It is located in the municipality of Santa Cruz del Norte, at the mouth of the Jibacoa River, 60 km east of Havana.

The settlement was founded in 1756 on the location of a corral.

== See also ==
- Arcos de Canasí
- Bacunayagua
- Boca de Jaruco
- Camilo Cienfuegos (Hershey)
