= Bacunayagua =

- Village
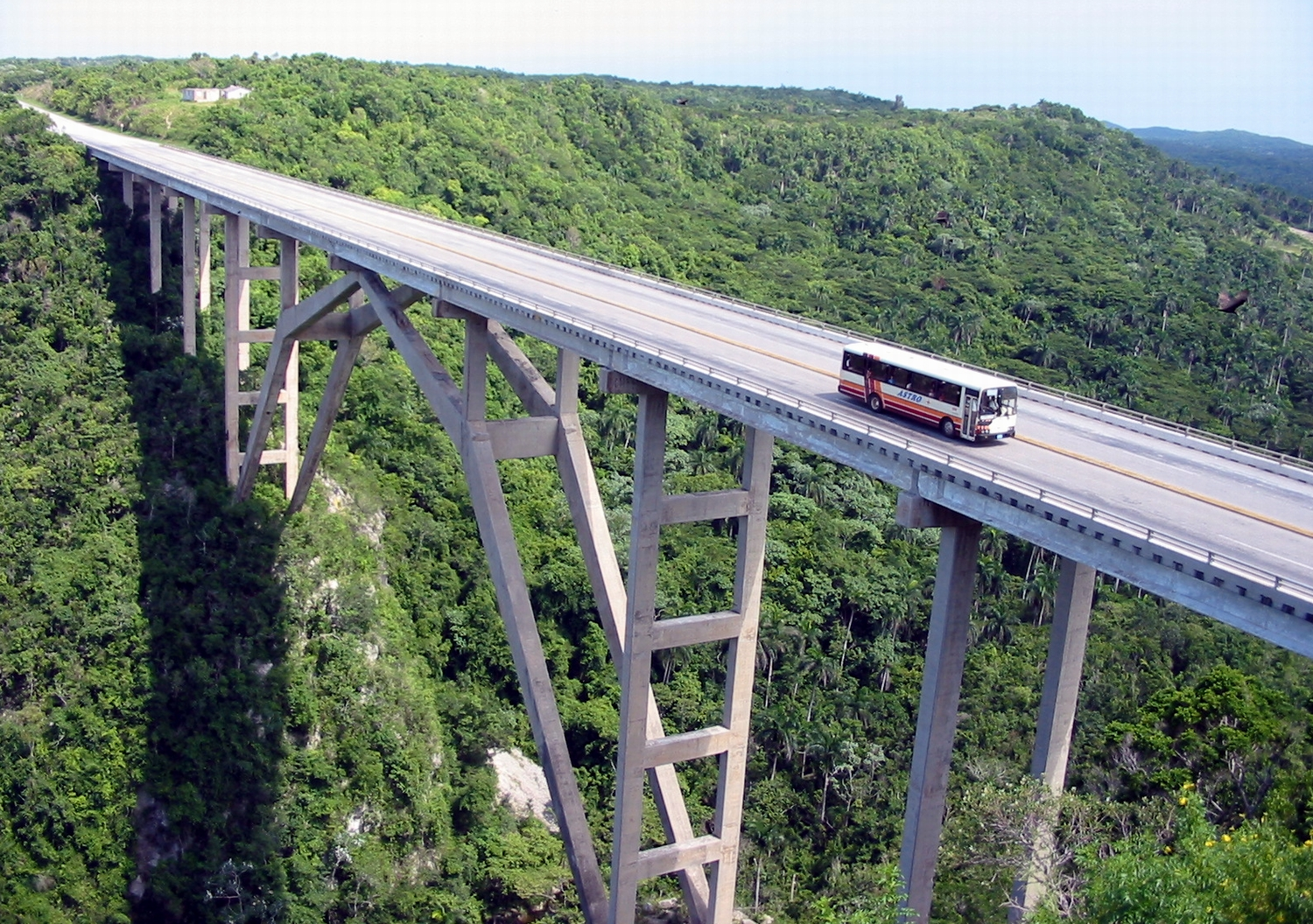
- Bacunayagua Bridge (es), the tallest in Cuba

- Location of Bacunayagua in Cuba
- Coordinates: 23°7′56.67″N 81°40′45.32″W
- Country: Cuba
- Province: Mayabeque
- Municipality: Santa Cruz del Norte

Population (2011)
  - Total: 3,371
- Time zone: UTC-5 (EST)
- Area code: +53-52

Bacunayagua is a Cuban village and consejo popular ("people's council", i.e. voting district) of the municipality of Santa Cruz del Norte, in Mayabeque Province. In 2011 it had a population of 3,371.

== Geography ==
The small northern Cuban settlement was established on the side of the important Vía Blanca (road), where a deep canyon cuts the coastal hills between the Yumuri Valley and the Straits of Florida coast. It marks the boundary between the Mayabeque Province and Matanzas Province.

== Transport ==
=== Bacunayagua Bridge ===
The Bridge of Bacunayagua, inaugurated in September 1959, crosses the canyon, and at 110 metres (360 ft) above the valley floor is the highest bridge in Cuba. Cubans consider it one of the seven wonders of Cuban civil engineering. It was designed by Luis Sáenz Duplace and built under the leadership of Civil Engineer Manuel (Manolo) Arvesu. A restaurant with an observation deck is built on the Mayabeque side, while the coastal cove on the Matanzas side includes a campground.

The bridge used to divide the provinces of La Habana and Matanzas, but after the reorganization of 2010, it now divides Matanzas Province from the new Mayabeque Province (the island's smallest, except for the city of Havana itself).

== See also ==
- Vía Blanca
- Arcos de Canasí
- Jibacoa
- Boca de Jaruco
- Camilo Cienfuegos (Hershey)
