= Jaruco =

Jaruco San Juan Bautista de Jaruco
- Municipality
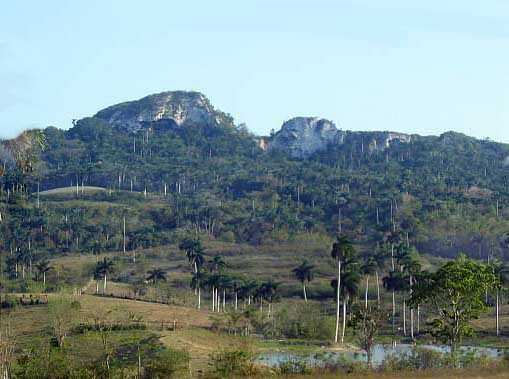
- The "Escaleras de Jaruco" hills

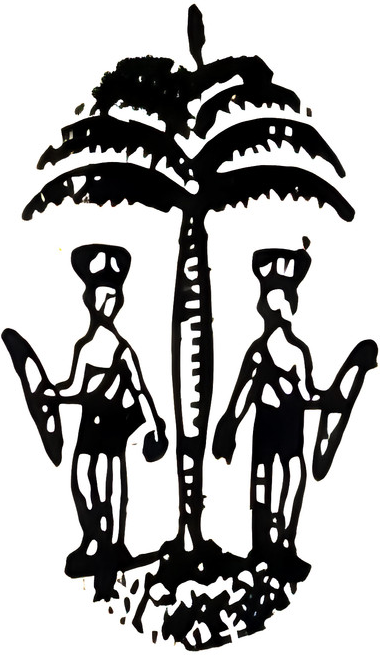
- Seal

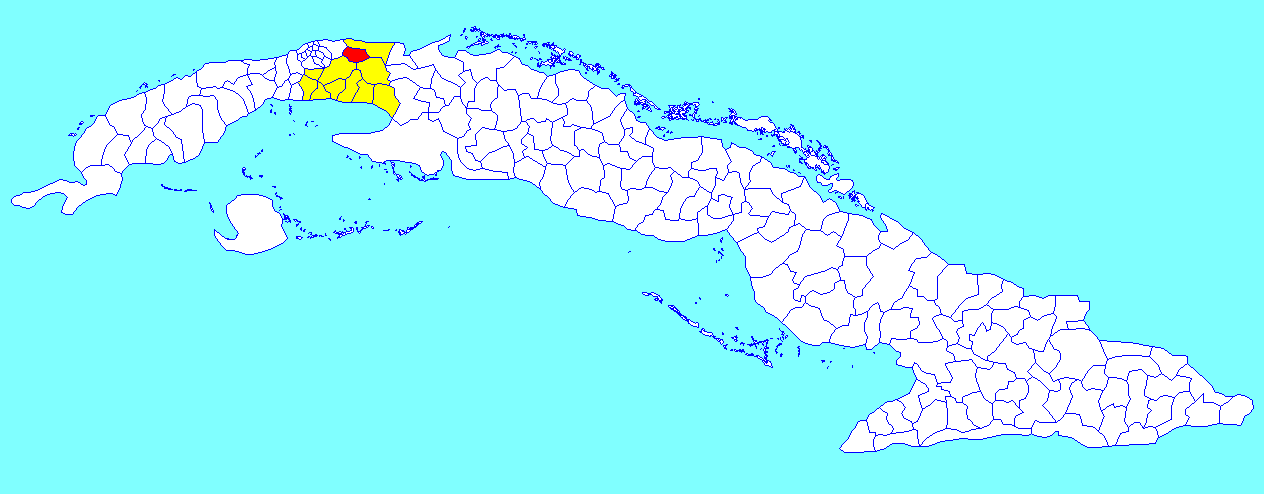
- Jaruco municipality (red) within Mayabeque Province (yellow) and Cuba
- Coordinates: 23°02′34″N 82°00′34″W
- Country: Cuba
- Province: Mayabeque
- Founded: 1762
- Established: 1931 (Municipality)

Area
  - Total: 276 km^{2} (107 sq mi)
- Elevation: 130 m (430 ft)

Population (2022)
  - Total: 24,162
  - Density: 87.5/km^{2} (227/sq mi)
- Time zone: UTC-5 (EST)
- Area code: +53-47
- Website: https://www.jarucociudadcondal.gob.cu/es/

Jaruco is a municipality and town in the Mayabeque Province of Cuba.

== Geography ==
The town is located in the east of Havana, between San José de las Lajas and Santa Cruz del Norte. The municipality borders with Habana del Este (municipal borough of Havana), Santa Cruz del Norte, Madruga and San José de las Lajas.

The Escaleras (stairs) of Jaruco rise up out of the plains and provide views of the area. The area is protected as a park and is a visiting spot from Havana and the beaches.

== History ==
Jaruco was founded in 1762 under the name San Juan Bautista de Jaruco (Ciudad Condal de San Juan Bautista de Jaruco). "Ajaruco" was the pre-Columbian Taíno name of the settlement.

In 1940, the municipality was divided into the barrios of Arroyo Vuelto, Casiguas, Castilla, Ciudad de Jaruco, Don Martín, Escaleras de Jaruco, Bainoa, San Antonio de Río Blanco del Norte and Santa Ana.

After 1959 this area was grouped into the Regional San José (with the small municipalities of Jaruco, San Antonio-Caraballo (formerly part of pre 1959 Aguacate municipality), Bainoa, etc.) Later Jaruco was the capital of Regional Bainoa which included the municipalities of Jaruco, Camilo Cenfuegos, Santa Cruz del Norte, Aguacate y Madruga.

Since 1976, the Jaruco municipality includes: Jaruco, Caraballo, San Antonio de Rio Blanco del Norte, Bainoa, Casiguas, Vista Alegre, Escaleras de Jaruco (and its beautiful park inside the mountains), Castilla y Tumba Cuatro.

In 2009 the Benedictines being a Roman Catholic congregation started to erect an own residence in Jaruco. The project failed in 2010 because of lack of water so that the Benedictines remained in their provisorial house in Havana (2011).

== Demographics ==
In 2022, the municipality of Jaruco had a population of 24,162. With a total area of 276 km^{2} (107 sq mi), it has a population density of 88/km^{2} (230/sq mi).

== Notable natives and residents ==
- Oribe - Celebrity hairdresser and entrepreneur

== See also ==
- Jaruco Municipal Museum
- Municipalities of Cuba
- List of cities in Cuba
