= Sagua de Tánamo =

- Municipality
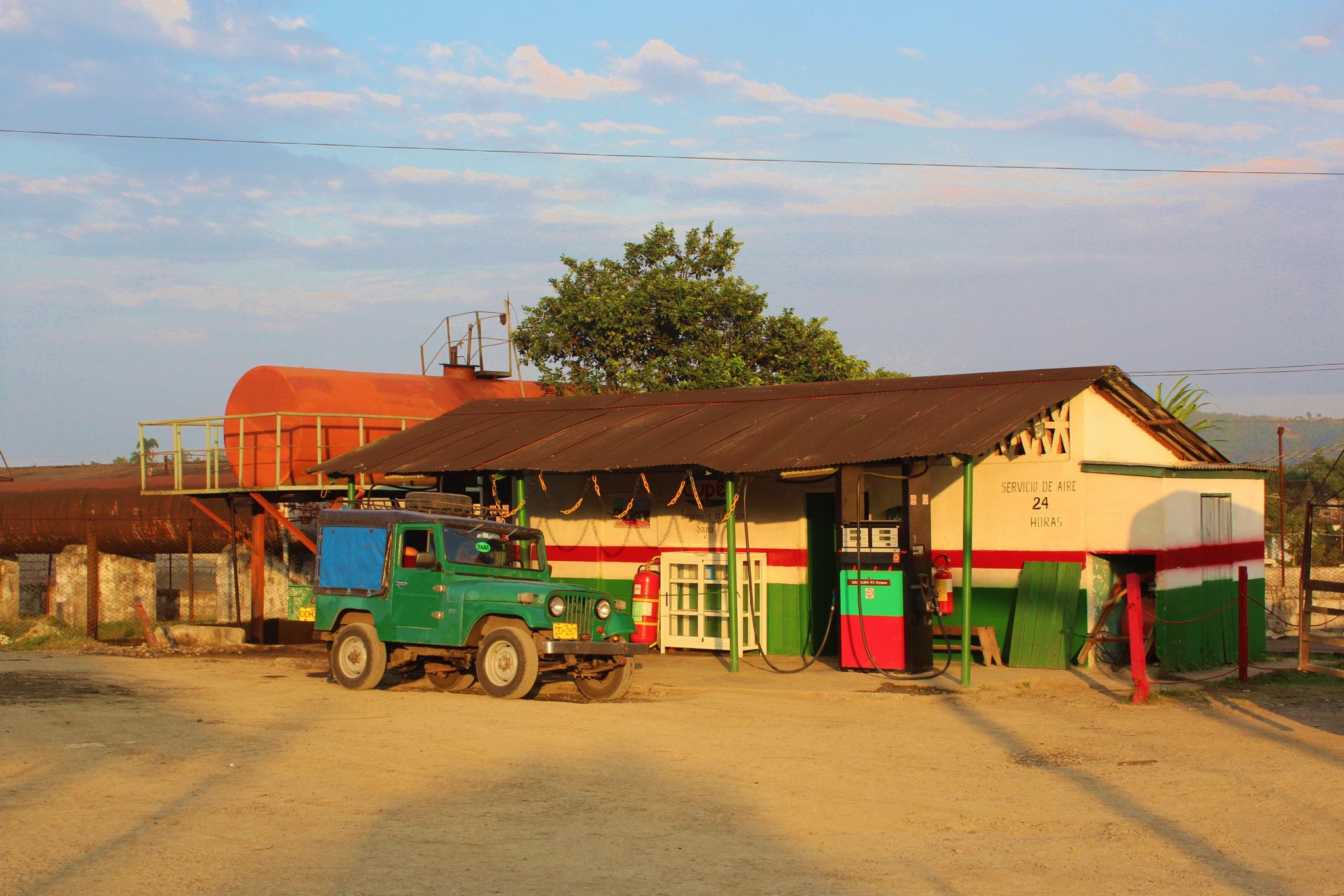
- A gas station in Sagua de Tánamo

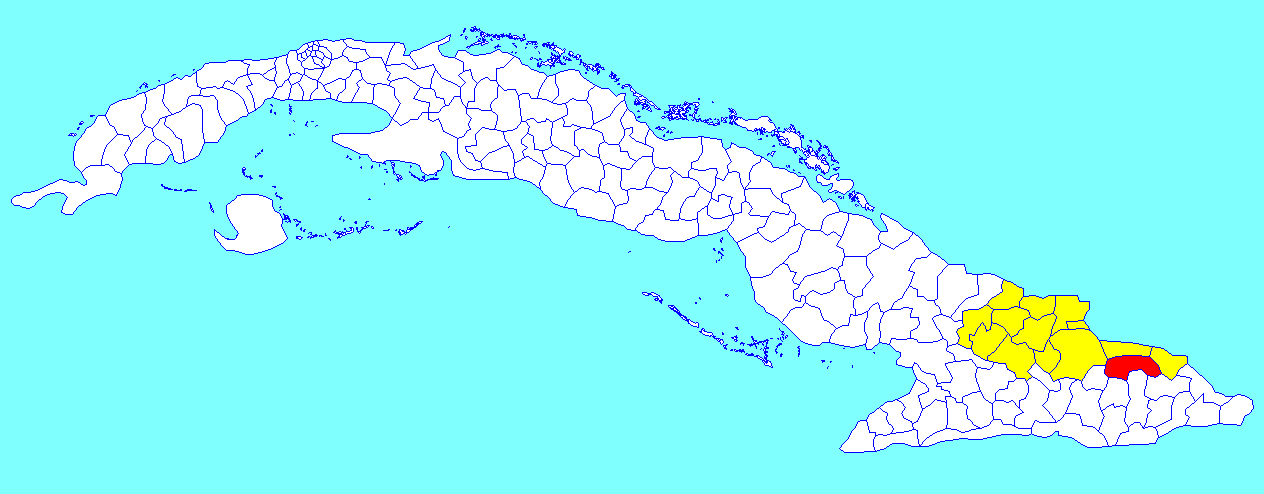
- Sagua de Tánamo municipality (red) within Holguín Province (yellow) and Cuba
- Coordinates: 20°35′9″N 75°14′30″W
- Country: Cuba
- Province: Holguín
- Established: 1804

Area
  - Total: 704 km^{2} (272 sq mi)
- Elevation: 10 m (33 ft)

Population (2022)
  - Total: 44,872
  - Density: 63.7/km^{2} (165/sq mi)
- Time zone: UTC-5 (EST)
- Area code: +53-24
- Website: https://www.saguadetanamo.gob.cu/es/

Sagua de Tánamo (Spanish pronunciation: [ˈsaɣwa ðe ˈtamano]) is a municipality and town in the Holguín Province of Cuba.

== Overview ==
The Sierra Cristal National Park (Spanish: Parque Nacional Sierra Cristal) is partly located in the Sagua de Tánamo municipality and partly in neighboring Mayarí.

The municipality is divided into the barrios of Barrederas, Bazán, Cananovas, Catalina, Esterón, Juan Díaz, Miguel, Pueblo, Sitio and Zabala. Carpintero, la Rosa, Rio Grande, La Guira, Naranjo.

== Demographics ==
In 2022, the municipality of Sagua de Tánamo had a population of 44,872. With a total area of 704 km^{2} (272 sq mi), it has a population density of 64/km^{2} (170/sq mi).

== See also ==
- List of cities in Cuba
- Municipalities of Cuba
