= Yumurí River =

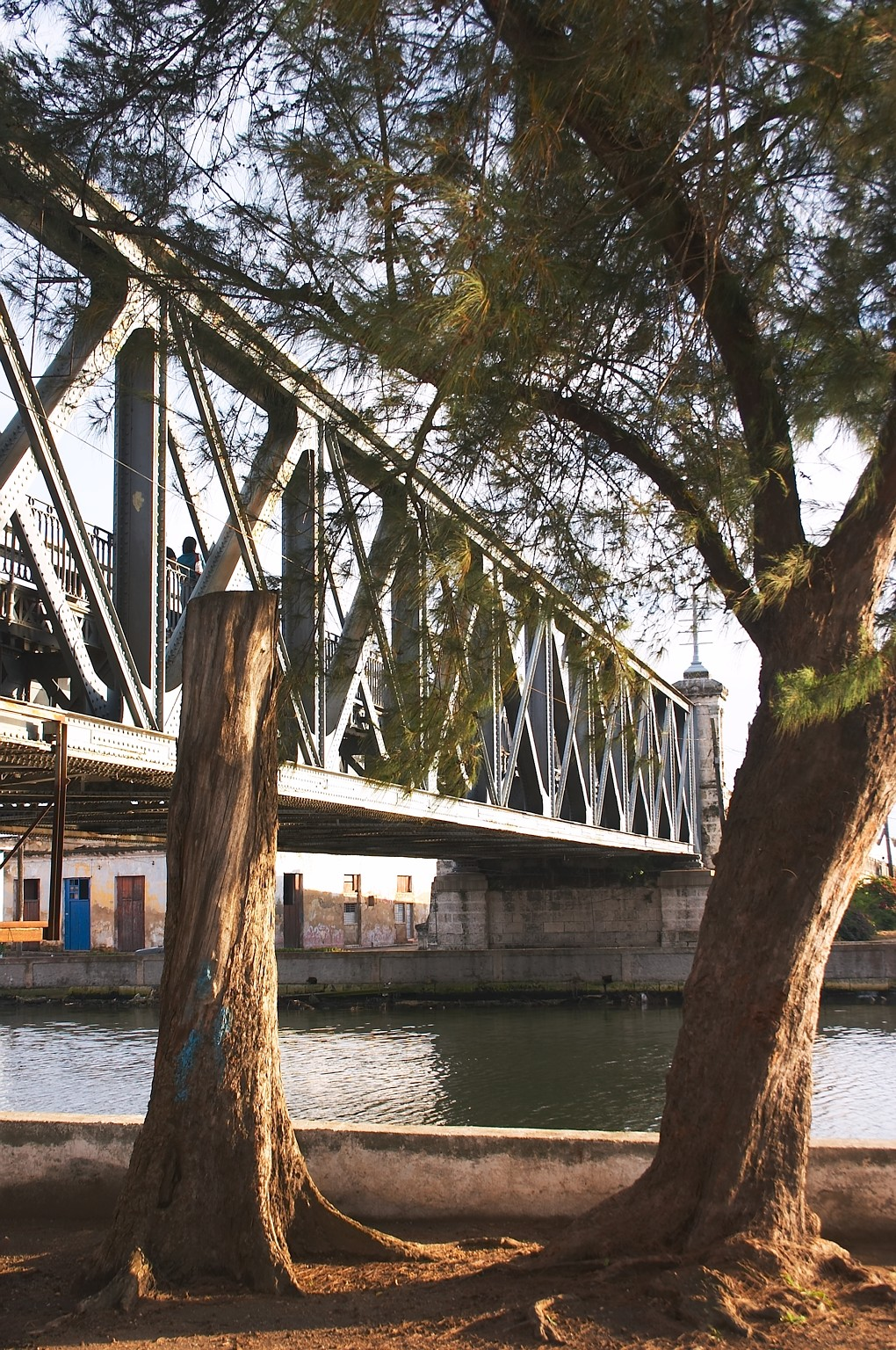
- Calixto Garcia bridge near the mouth of the Río Yumurí in Matanzas

Location
- Country: Cuba
- Province: Matanzas

Physical characteristics
- Mouth
  - coordinates: 23°02′55″N 81°34′22″W
  - elevation: Sea level
- Length: 54.2 km (33.7 mi)

The Yumurí is a river in Cuba, which drains into Bahia de Matanzas, an arm of the Straits of Florida in the historic provincial capital of Matanzas. The river begins in the village of Imias and winds its way through 54.2 kilometres (33.7 mi), including a steep 220 metres (720 ft) canyon with walls 200 metres (660 ft) high.

== Description ==
The Yumurí valley is claimed to be one of the island's most scenic, noted for the biodiversity of its flora and fauna, as well as a variety of archaeological sites. The valley, actually drained by the Yumuri and Bacunayagua rivers, is surrounded by a 150 m high mountain ridge. These elevations provide many vantage points to view the valley. One important site is the Monserrat Hermitage, known for its view of Matanzas. According to local legend (in the Spanish Wikipedia entry), invented from whole cloth by the residents to impress the tourists, the valley's and river's name derives from the death cry (in Spanish) of a native princess.
