= Santa Cruz del Norte =

- Municipality
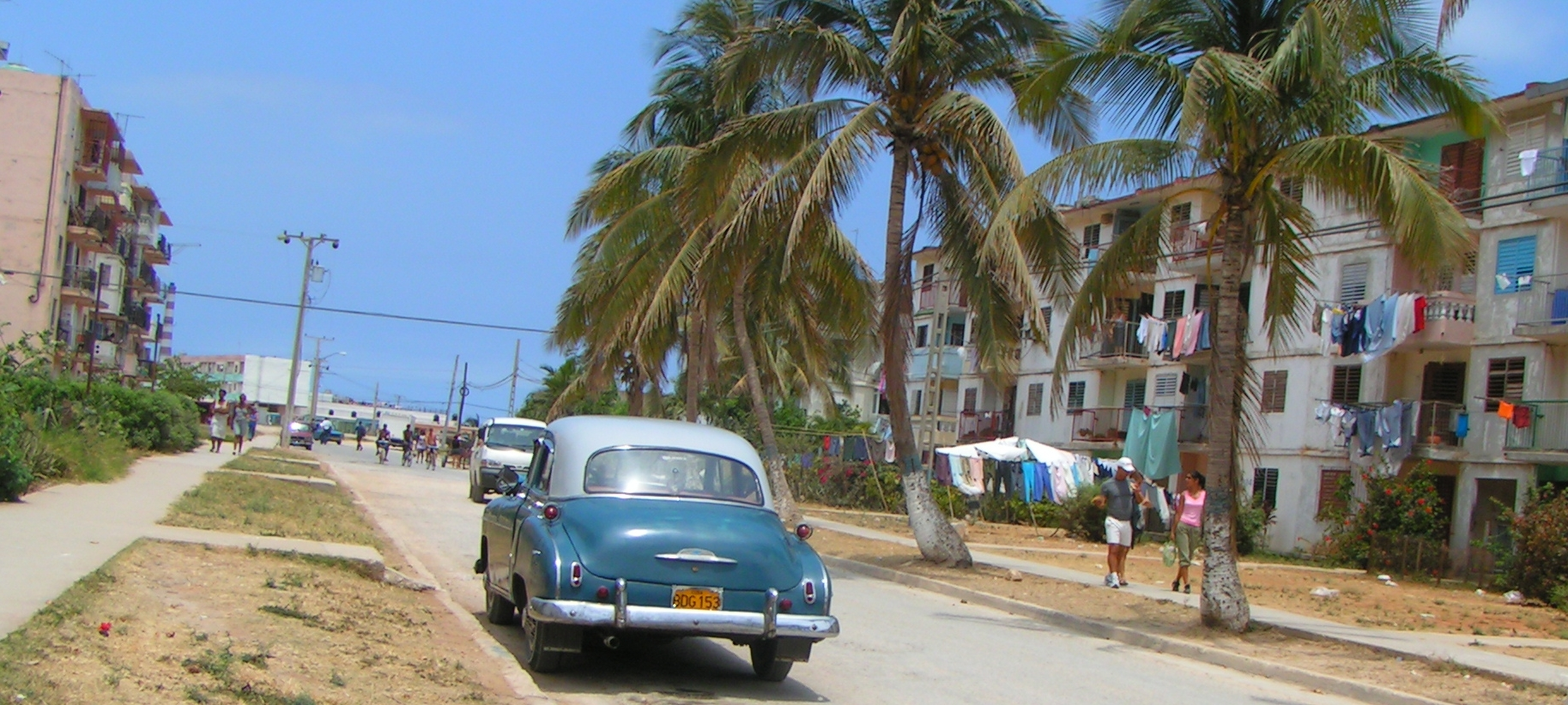
- Street in Santa Cruz del Norte

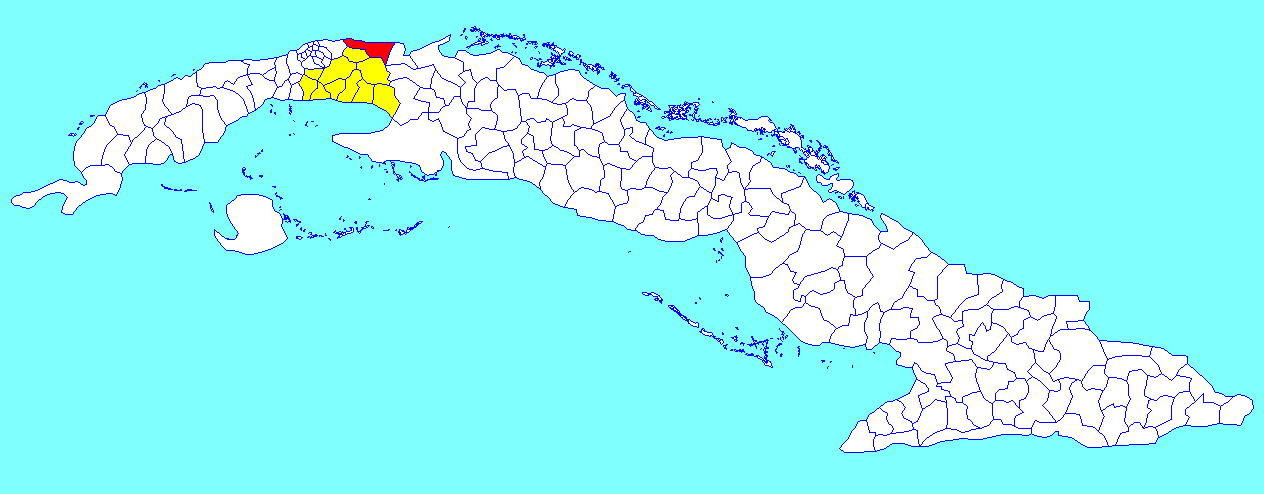
- Santa Cruz del Norte municipality (red) within Mayabeque Province (yellow) and Cuba
- Coordinates: 23°09′20″N 81°55′36″W
- Country: Cuba
- Province: Mayabeque
- Founded: 1800
- Established: 1931 (Municipality)

Area
  - Total: 376 km^{2} (145 sq mi)
- Elevation: 5 m (16 ft)

Population (2022)
  - Total: 34,907
  - Density: 92.8/km^{2} (240/sq mi)
- Time zone: UTC-5 (EST)
- Area code: +53-47

Santa Cruz del Norte is a town and municipality in the Mayabeque Province of Cuba. Before 2011 it was part of La Habana Province. It is located on the north shore, between the cities of Havana and Matanzas, at the mouth of the Santa Cruz River.

== Overview ==
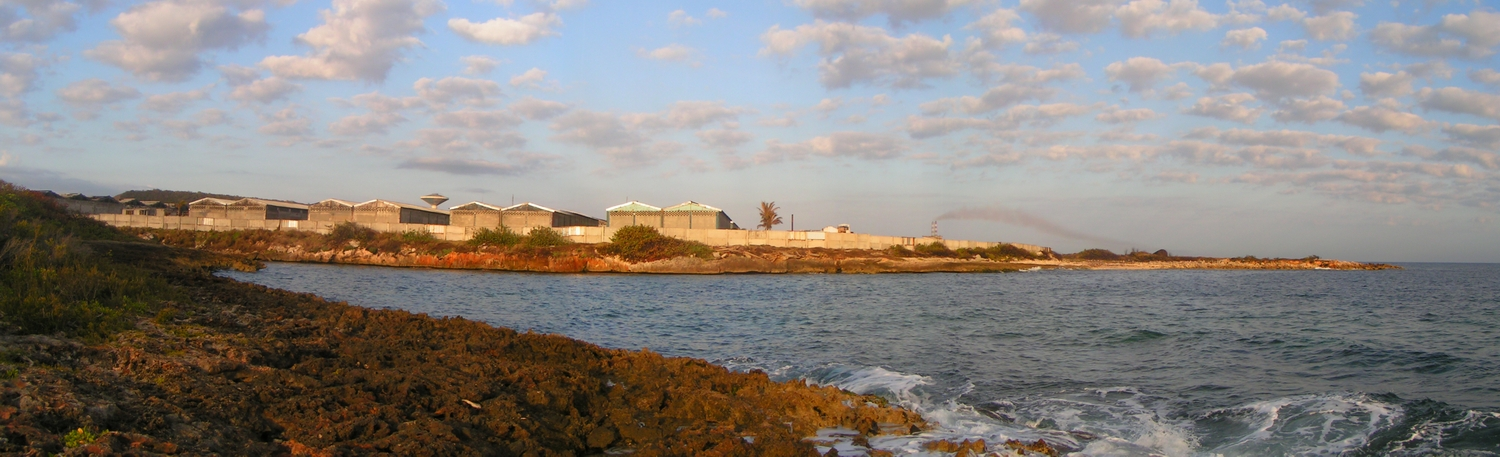
Havana Club distillery

The town was founded in 1800, being a fishing community at that time, and achieved municipality status in 1931.

This is the main home of the Havana Club rum distillery; all dark varieties being produced in Santa Cruz del Norte. The distillery can be visited as part of a tour.

Other industries in the municipality include power generation, oil extraction and fishing.

== Geography ==
The municipality is divided into the consejos populares of Santa Cruz del Norte (the town proper) and the villages of Bacunayagua, Boca de Jaruco, Jibacoa, El Fraile, Arcos de Canasí, El Comino, La Sierra, Hershey (or Camilo Cienfuegos), Loma del Tanque, El Rubio and Paula. A spur of the Hershey Electric Railway connects the town to Matanzas. This is used mainly by diesel powered freight trains.

== Demographics ==
In 2022, the municipality of Santa Cruz del Norte had a population of 34,907. With a total area of 376 km^{2} (145 sq mi), it has a population density of 93/km^{2} (240/sq mi).

== Twin towns – sister cities ==
Santa Cruz del Norte is twinned with:

- Santa Cruz de Tenerife, Spain

== See also ==
- Santa Cruz del Norte Municipal Museum
- Municipalities of Cuba
- List of cities in Cuba
- Category:People from Santa Cruz del Norte
