= Mayabeque Province =

Province of Cuba

Coordinates: 22°58′5″N 82°09′21″W

- Province of Cuba
- Coat of arms

- Country: Cuba
- Capital: San José de las Lajas
- Municipalities: San José de las Lajas, Jaruco, Santa Cruz del Norte, Madruga, Nueva Paz, Güines, Melena del Sur, Quivicán, Batabanó, San Nicolás de Bari, Bejucal

Government
  - President: Tamara Valido Benítez
  - Vice-President: Manuel Aguiar Lamas

Area
  - Total: 3,732.73 km^{2} (1,441.22 sq mi)

Population (2010-12-31)
  - Total: 381,385
  - Density: 102.173/km^{2} (264.627/sq mi)
- Time zone: UTC-5 (EST)
- Area code: +53-47
- HDI (2019): 0.797 high · 3rd of 16
- Website: https://www.mayaweb.gob.cu/es/

Mayabeque Province is one of two new provinces created from the former La Habana Province, whose creation was approved by the Cuban National Assembly on August 1, 2010, the other being Artemisa Province. The new provinces came in to existence on January 1, 2011.

== Overview ==
Mayabeque is made up of the 11 eastern municipalities of the former La Habana province, with the capital in San José de las Lajas. Mayabeque Province is named after the Mayabeque River (the largest in this territory) as well as the south shore of Mayabeque beach, the place believed to be the original location of Havana village (San Cristóbal de La Habana) that was founded in 1514.

The new province became the smallest (excluding Havana city province) and least populated province in the country.

Mayabeque's economy is based on agriculture (potatoes, fruits, vegetables, sugar cane) and livestock farming, particularly milk production. It also has a relevant industry sector located mainly in San José de las Lajas and Santa Cruz del Norte. Products include building materials, electrical cables, rubber industry, glass vessels, ceramics, food processing, paper processing, bio-pharmaceuticals (in Bejucal), fishing products, and oil and gas extraction. The province also has two large Havana Club rum factories, power plants, and sugar mills; as well as important scientific institutions and an agricultural science university.

== Municipalities ==
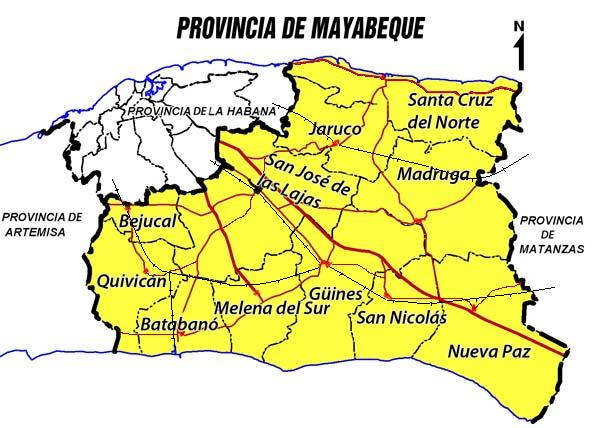
Map of Mayabeque Province

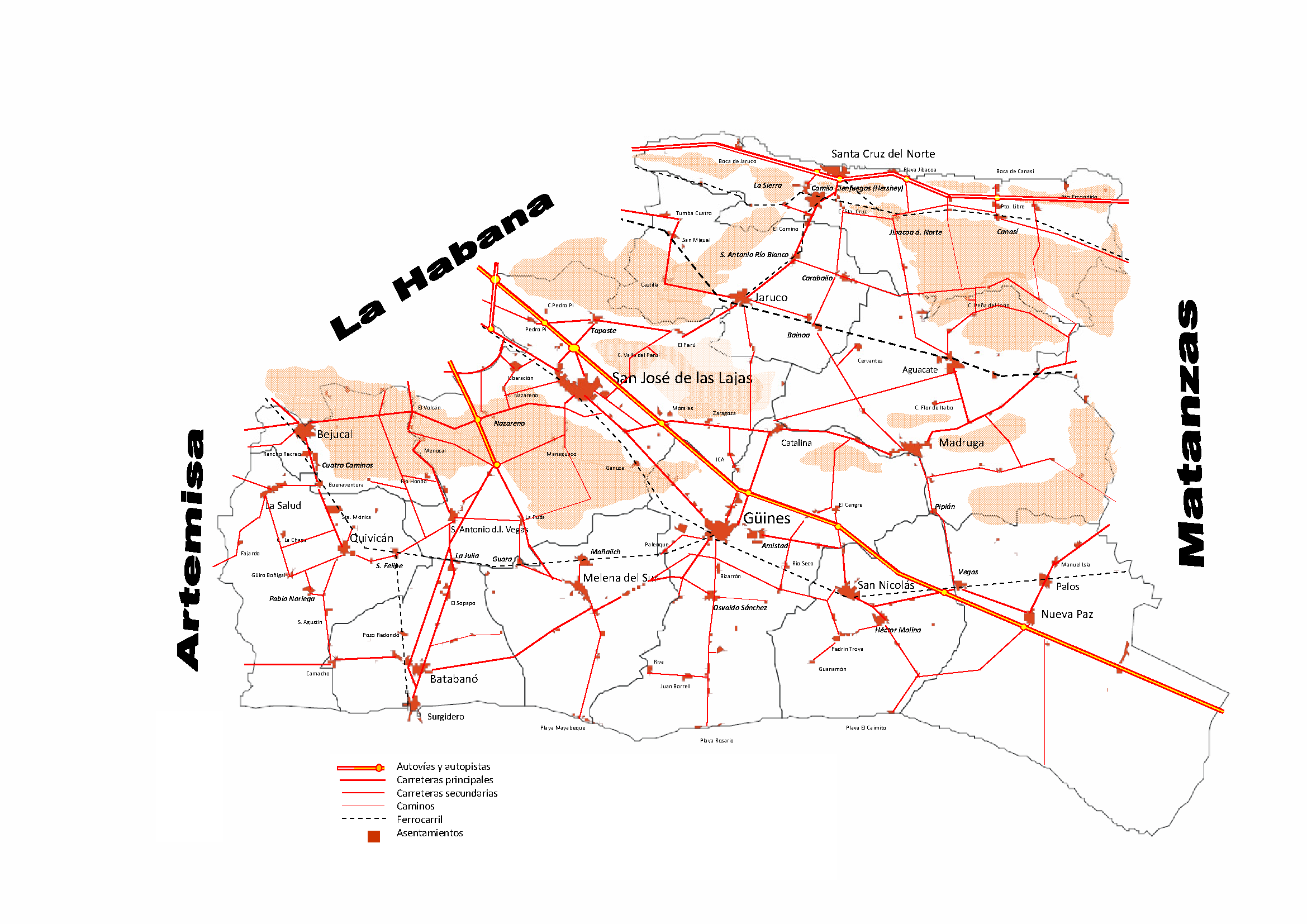
Road map of Mayabeque Province

| Municipality | km^{2} | Population | inhabitants/km^{2} |
|---|---|---|---|
| Bejucal | 116.36 | 26,966 | 231.7 |
| San José de las Lajas | 592.67 | 74,186 | 125.2 |
| Jaruco | 275.9 | 25,135 | 91.1 |
| Santa Cruz del Norte | 379.38 | 34,216 | 90.2 |
| Madruga | 459.58 | 29,805 | 64.9 |
| Nueva Paz | 522.8 | 25,471 | 48.7 |
| San Nicolás | 228.86 | 20,695 | 90.4 |
| Güines | 433.09 | 67,919 | 156.8 |
| Melena del Sur | 233.56 | 20,646 | 88.4 |
| Batabanó | 263.43 | 26,944 | 102.3 |
| Quivicán | 227.1 | 29,463 | 129.7 |
| Total | 3,732.73 | 381,446 | 102.2 |

Source: Oficina Nacional de Estadísticas e Instituto de Planificación Física/2010

The most populated cities are Güines (42 000 hab.) and San José de las Lajas (37 000 hab.)
