= Transport in Cuba =

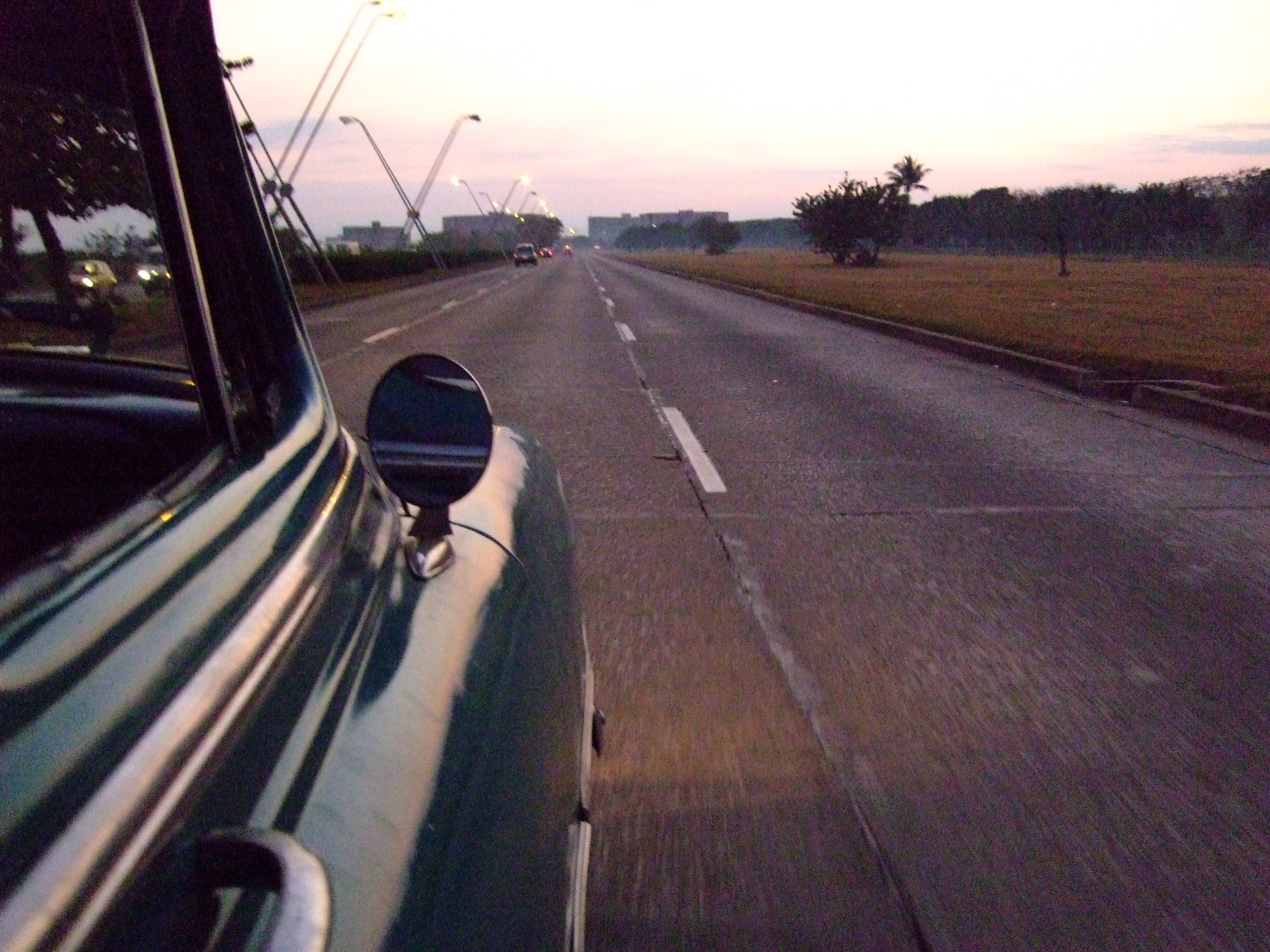
View of the Autopista Nacional (National Highway)

Transportation in Cuba is the system of railways, roads, airports, waterways, ports, and harbours in Cuba.

== Railways Of Cuba ==
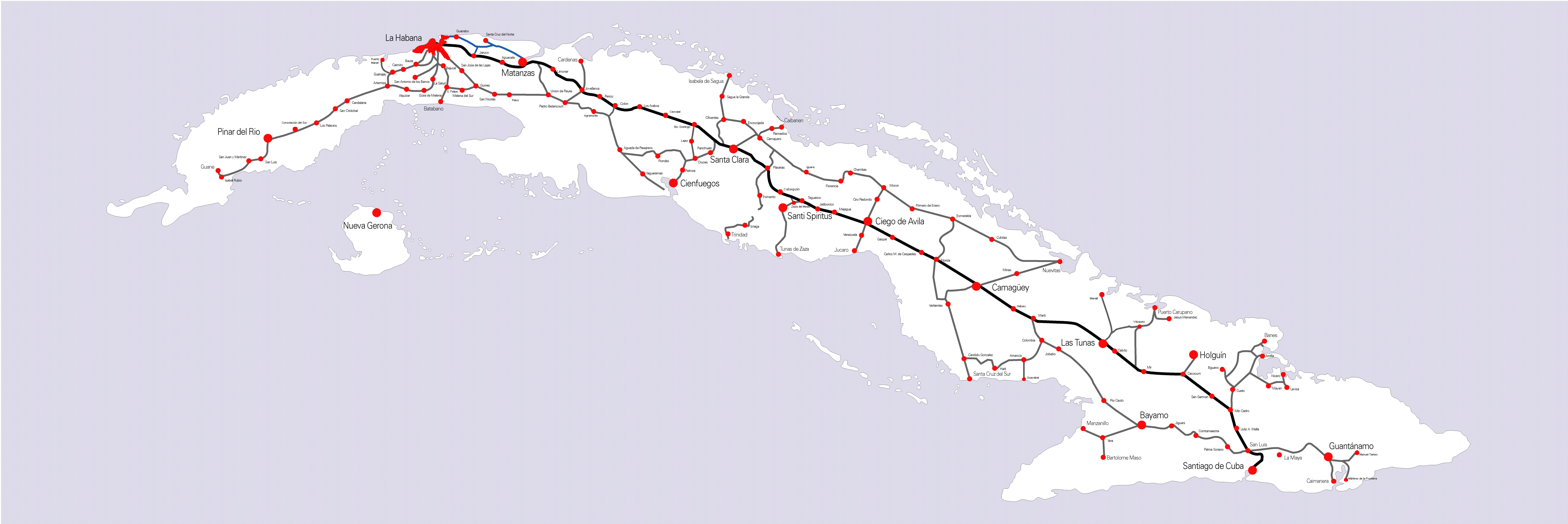
Railway network in Cuba

- Total: 8,285 km
- Standard gauge: 8,125 km 1,435 mm (4 ft 8 1/2 in) gauge (1055 km electrified)
- Narrow gauge: 160 km of 2 ft 3 1/2 in (699 mm) gauge.

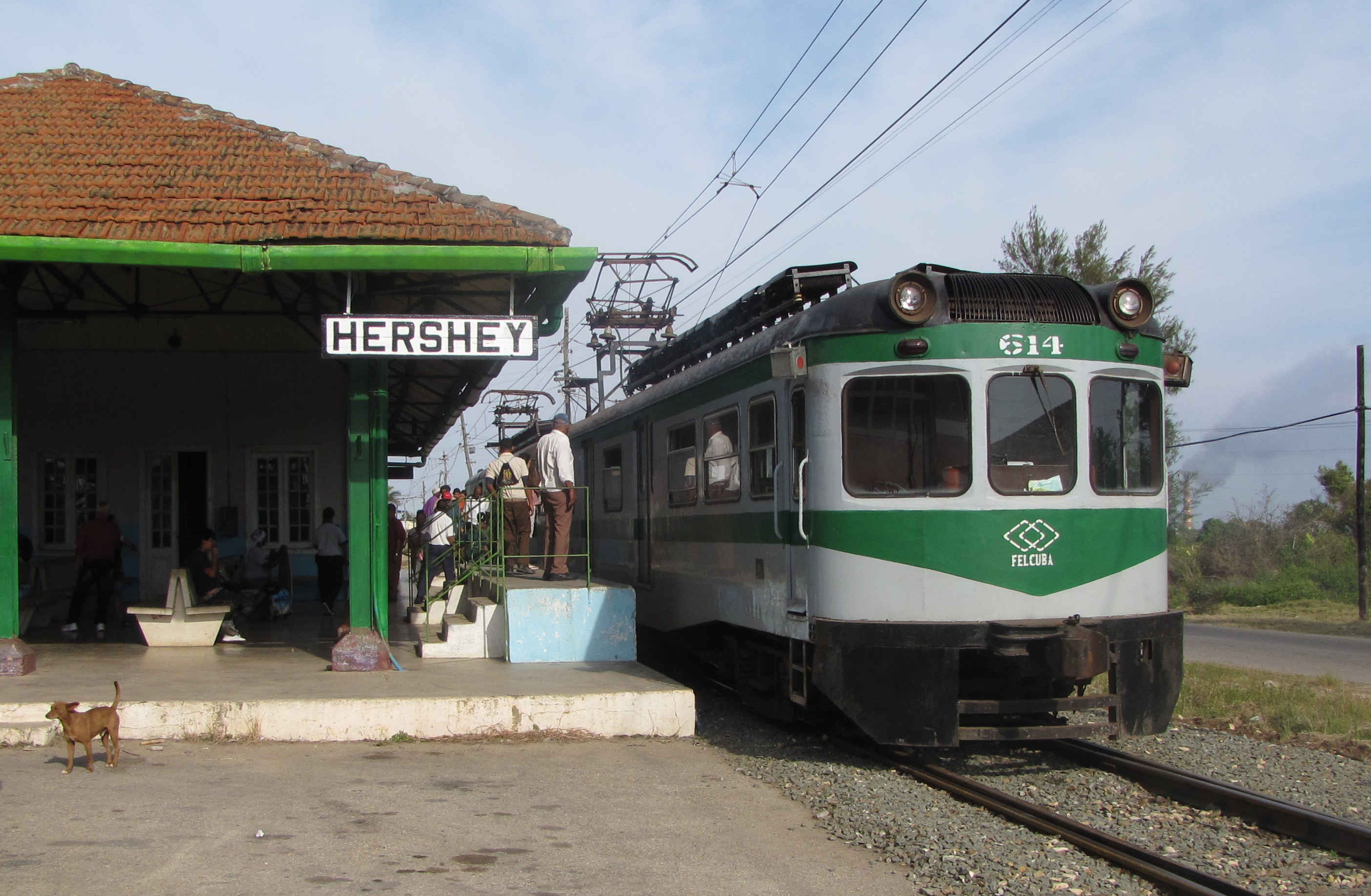
Hershey Electric Railway

Cuba built the first railway system in the Spanish empire, before the 1848 start in the Iberian peninsula. While the rail infrastructure dates from colonial and early republican times, passenger service along the principal Havana to Santiago corridor is increasingly reliable and popular with tourists who can purchase tickets in Cuban convertible pesos. As with most public transport in Cuba, many of the vehicles used are second hand.

With the order of 12 new Chinese locomotives in 2006, built specifically for Cuban Railways at China Northern Locomotives and Rolling Stock Works, services have been improving in reliability. Those benefiting the most are long-distance freight services with the French train Havana-Santiago being the only passenger train using one of the new Chinese locomotives regularly.

In 2019, the Cuban railways received the first delivery of new Chinese-built coaches, and new services with these began in July 2019.

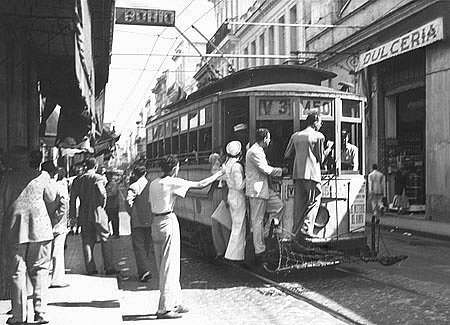
Streetcar in Havana

Metro systems are not present in the island, although a suburban rail network exists in Havana. Urban tramways were in operation between 1858 and 1954, initially as horse-drawn systems. In the early 20th century electric trolley or storage battery powered tramways were introduced in seven cities. Of these overhead wire systems were adopted in Havana, Guanabacoa, Matanzas, Cienfuegos, Camagüey and Santiago de Cuba.

== Roads ==
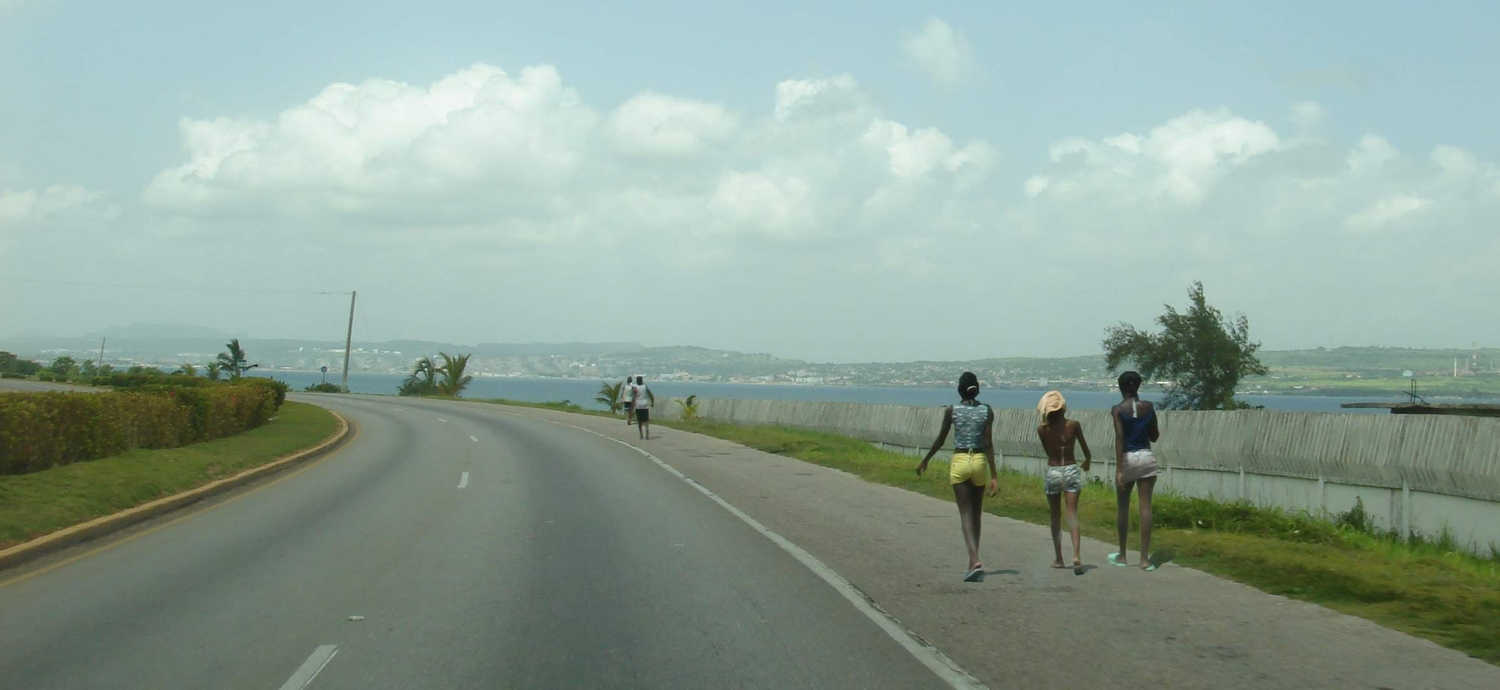
Via Blanca highway near Matanzas

The total length of Cuba's highways is 60,858 km, including

- paved: 29,820 km (including 915 km of expressways)
- unpaved: 31,038 km (1999 est.)

Expressways (autopistas) include:

- the Autopista Nacional (A1) from Havana to Santa Clara and Sancti Spiritus, with additional short sections near Santiago and Guantanamo
- the Autopista Este-Oeste (A4) from Havana to Pinar del Río
- the Autopista del Mediodia from Havana to San Antonio de los Baños
- an autopista from Havana to Melena del Sur
- an autopista from Havana to Mariel
- the Havana ring road (Spanish: 1er anillo de La Habana), which starts at a tunnel under the entrance to Havana Harbor
- the section of the Via Blanca from Matanzas to Varadero (toll road)
- an autopista from Nueva Gerona to Santa Fe, in the Isla de la Juventud

Older roads include the Carretera Central, and the Via Blanca from Havana to Matanzas.

== Long-distance and inter-municipality buses in Cuba ==
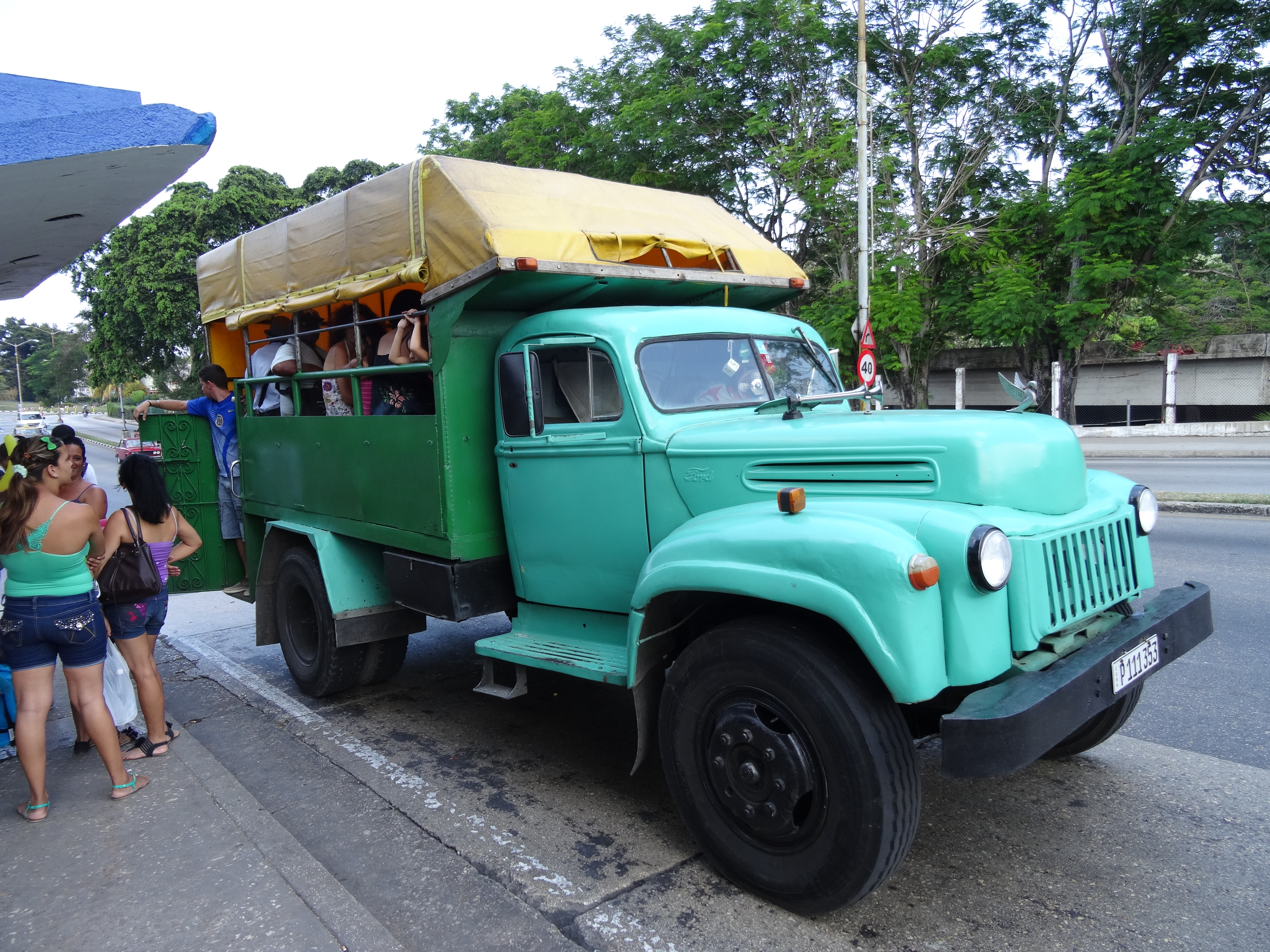
Private owned truck-bus ("Camion") Ford in 2014

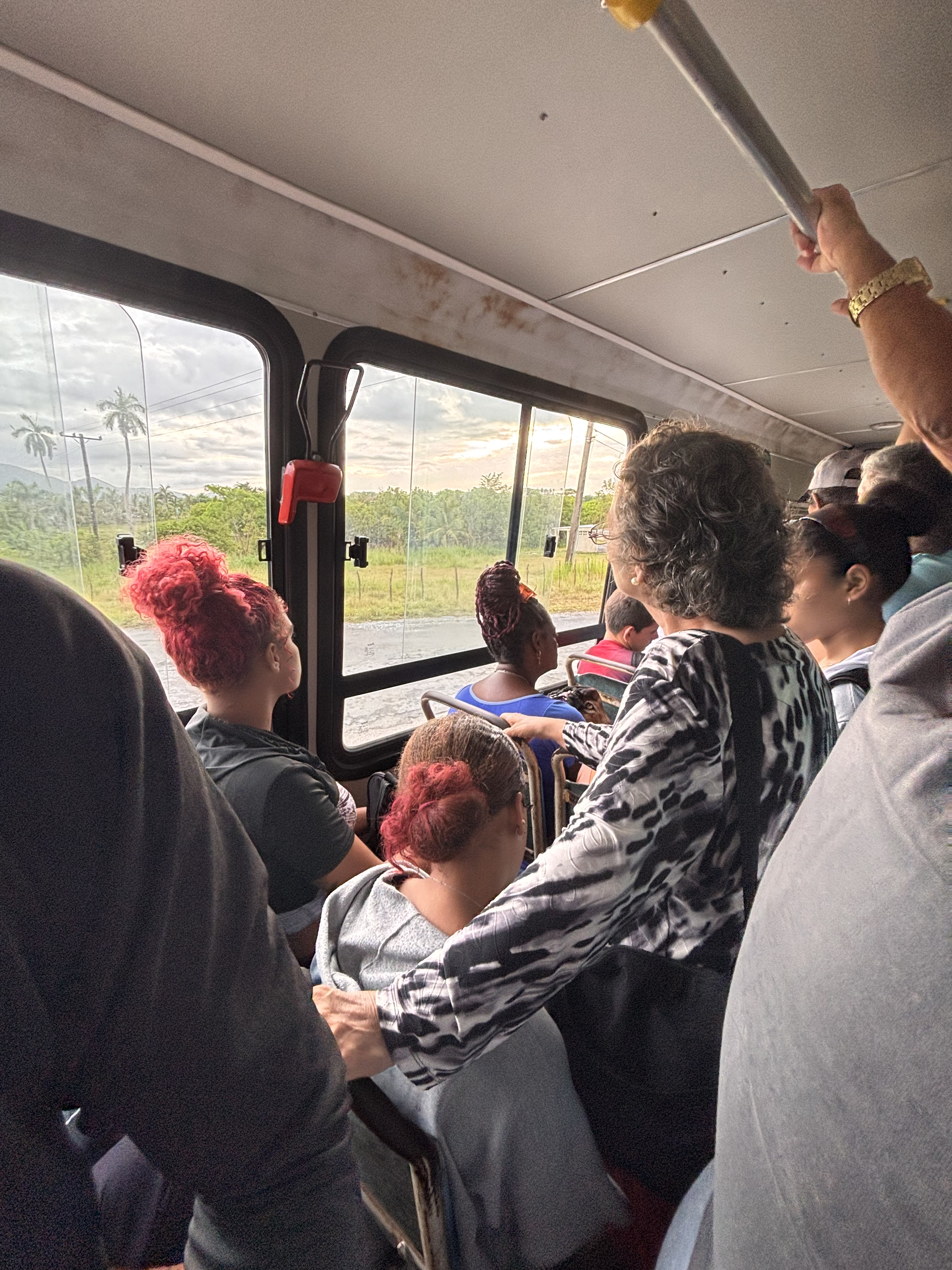
Interior of a bus in Artemisa Province in 2025

There are several national bus companies in Cuba. Viazul operates a fleet of modern and comfortable coaches on longer distance routes designed principally for tourists. Schedules, prices, and ticket booking can be done online, at any of the major international airports or National Terminals across Cuba. There are also other bus lines operated by tourism companies.

AstroBus, a bus service in Cuban National Pesos, designed to bring comfortable air-conditioned coaches to Cuban locals at an affordable price. The AstroBus lines operate with modern Chinese Yutong buses, and are accessible to Cuban Residents of Cuba with their ID Card, and is payable in Cuba Pesos. Routes that have benefited most so far are those from Havana to each of the 13 provincial capitals of the country.

== Urban buses ==
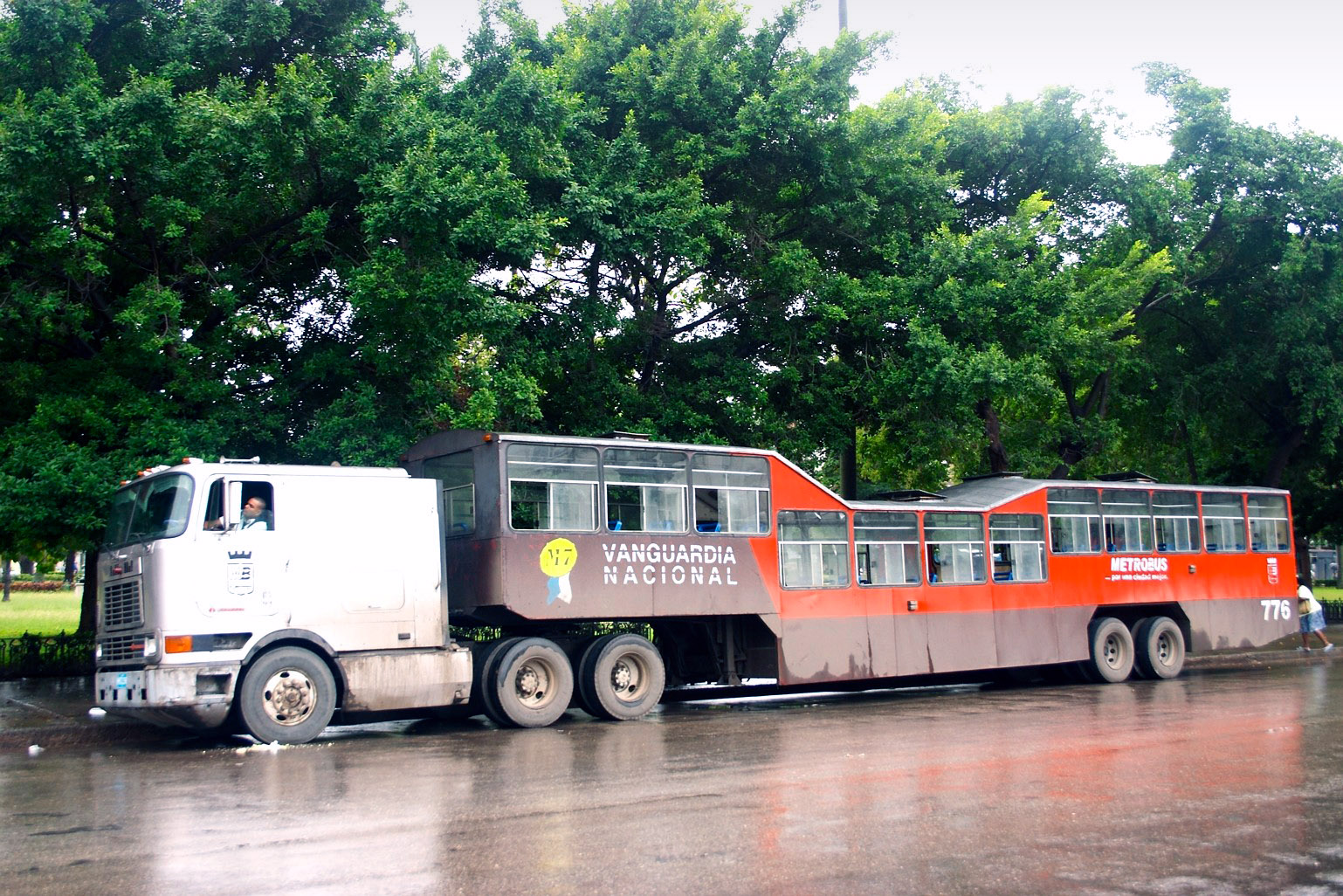
Camel bus in Havana

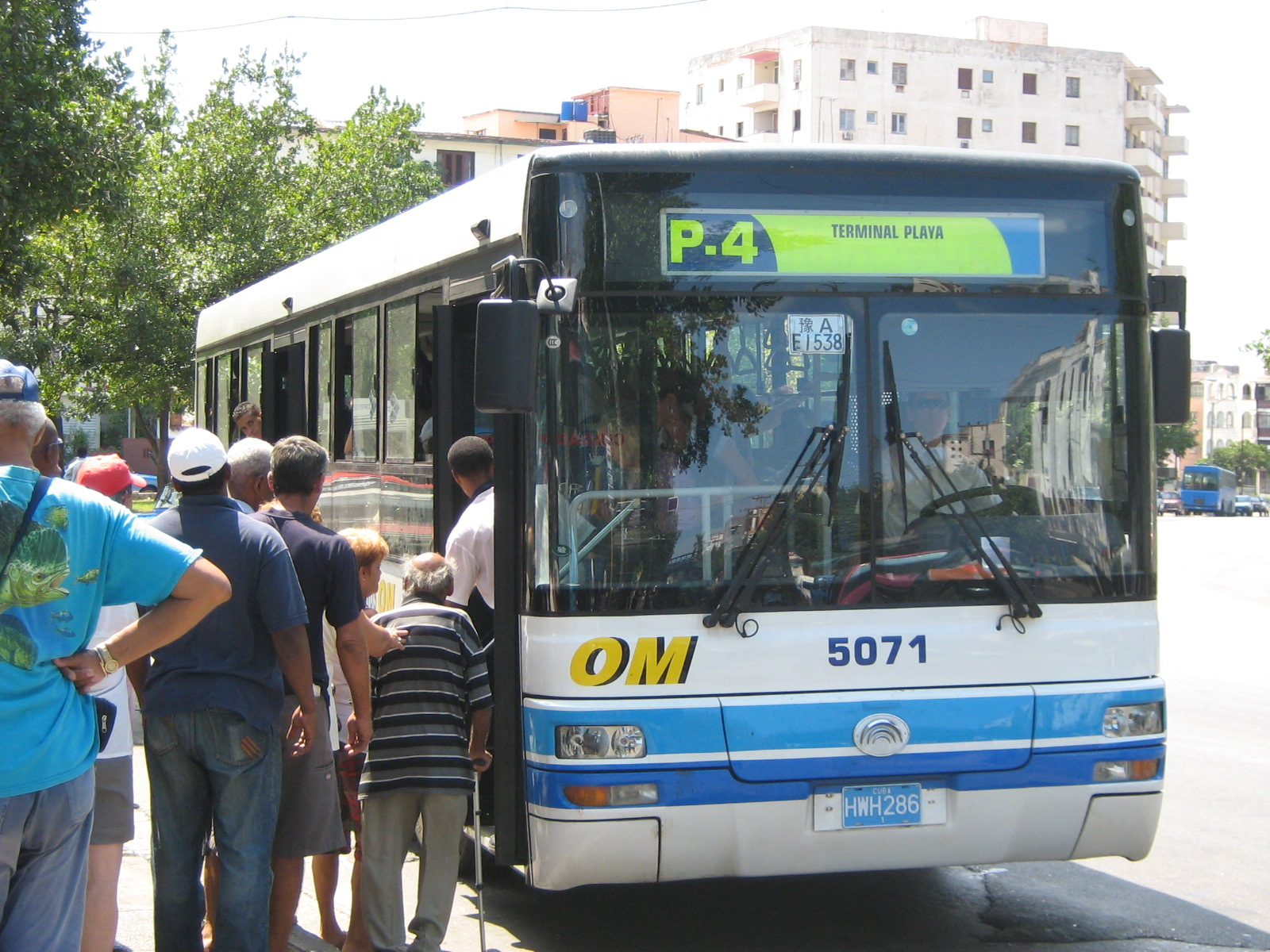
A Yutong bus in Havana

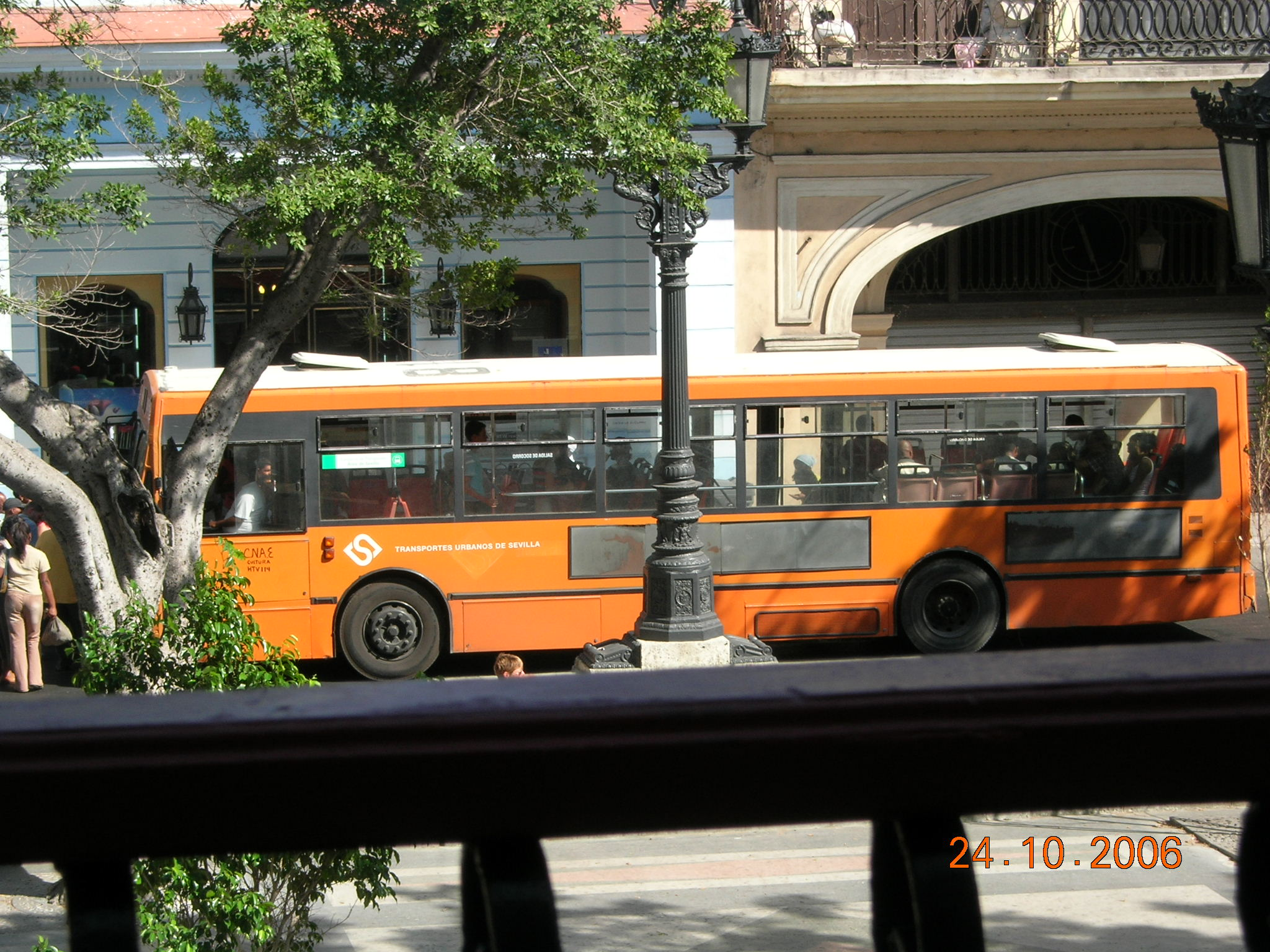
A decommissioned bus from Seville, now operating in Havana

In Havana, urban transportation used to be provided by a colorful selection of buses imported from the Soviet Union or Canada. Many of these vehicles were second hand, such as the 1,500 decommissioned Dutch buses that the Netherlands donated to Cuba in the mid-1990s as well as GM fishbowl buses from Montreal. Despite the United States trade embargo, American-style yellow school buses (imported second-hand from Canada) are also increasingly common sights. Since 2008, service on seven key lines in and out of the city is provided by Chinese Zhengzhou Yutong Buses. These replaced the famous camellos ("camels" or "dromedaries", after their "humps") trailer buses that hauled as many as two hundred passengers in a passenger-carrying trailer.

After the upgrading of Seville's public bus fleet to CNG-powered vehicles, many of the decommissioned ones were donated to the city of Havana. These bright orange buses still display the name of Transportes Urbanos de Sevilla, S.A.M., their former owner, and Seville's coat of arms as a sign of gratitude.

As of 2016, urban transport in Havana consists entirely of modern Yutong diesel buses. Seville and Ikarus buses are gone.

== Automobiles ==
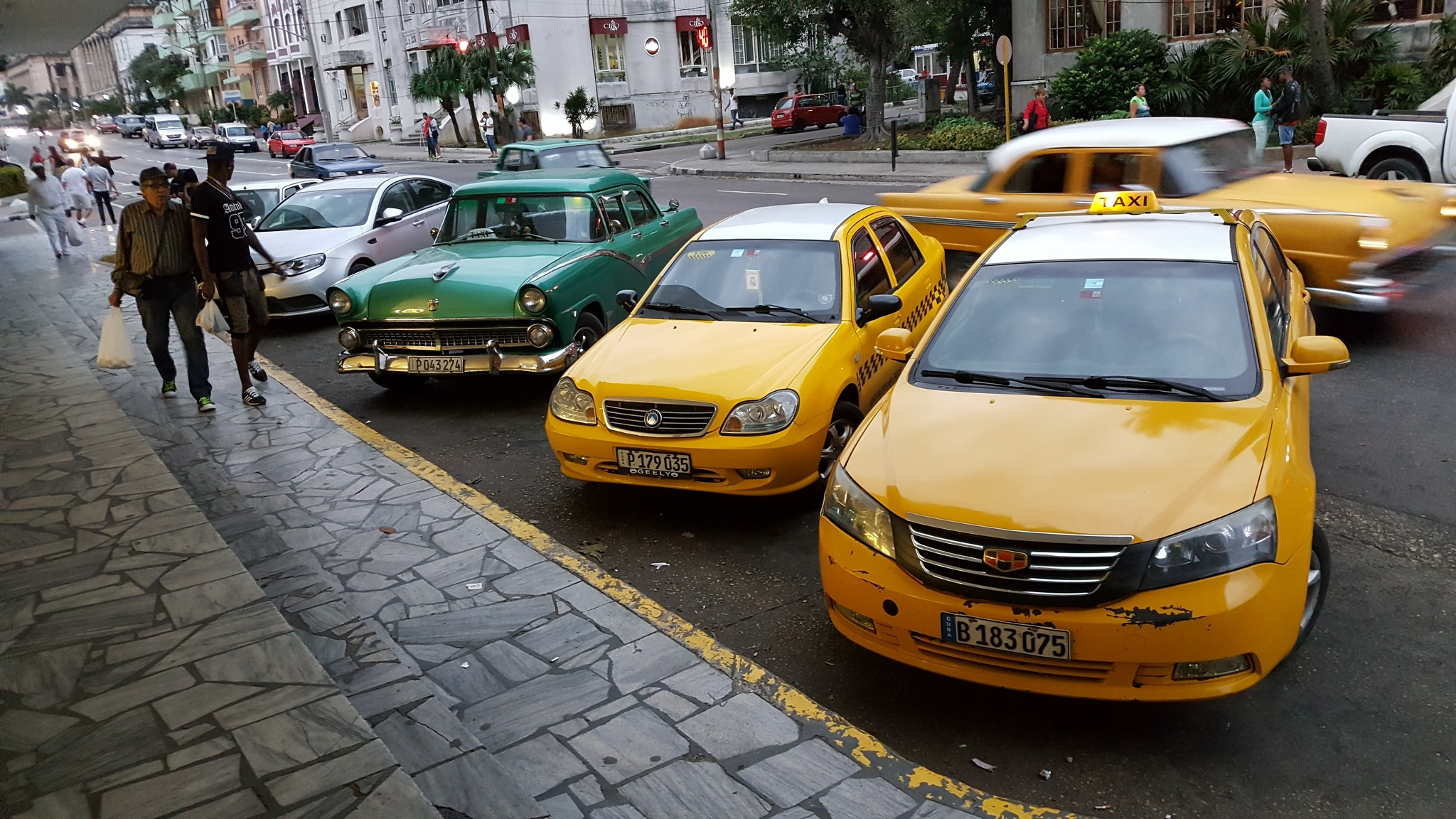
Geely CK (left) and Emgrand EC7 (right) taxis in Havana, January 2017

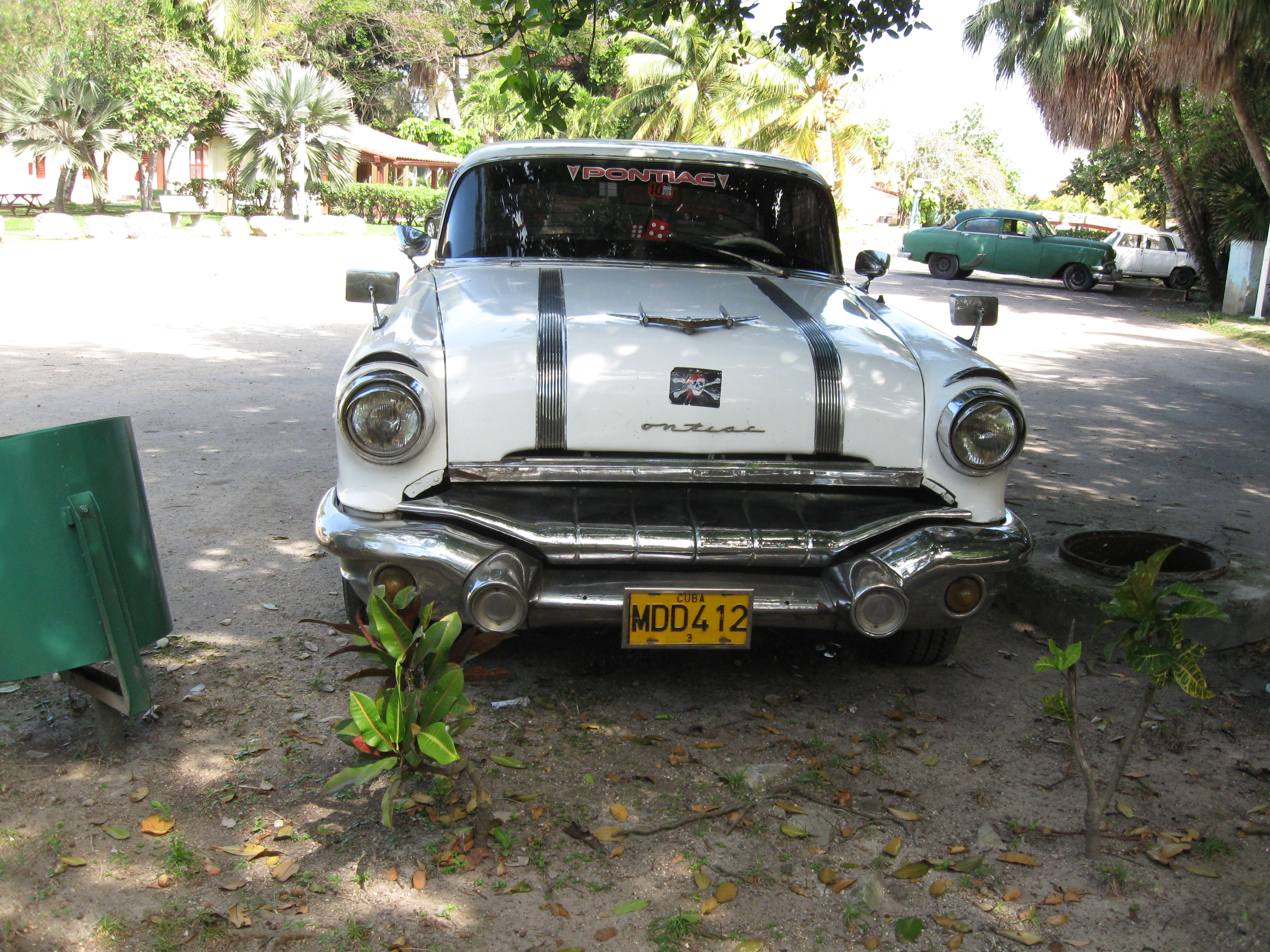
A Cuban Pontiac car in 2011

Since 2009, Cuba has imported sedans from Chinese automaker Geely to serve as police cars, taxis and rental vehicles. Previously, the Soviet Union supplied Volgas, Moskvichs, and Ladas, as well as heavy trucks like the ZIL and the KrAZ; and Cuba also bought cars from European and Asian companies. In 2004, it was estimated that there were some 173,000 cars in Cuba.

=== Old American cars in Cuba ===
Most new vehicles came to Cuba from the United States until the 1960 United States embargo against Cuba ended importation of both cars and their parts. As many as 60,000 American vehicles are in use, nearly all in private hands. Of Cuba's vintage American cars, many have been modified with newer engines, disc brakes and other parts, often scavenged from Soviet cars, and most bear the marks of decades of use. Pre-1960 vehicles remain the property of their original owners and descendants, and can be sold to other Cubans providing the proper traspaso certificate is in place.

However, the old American cars on the road today have "relatively high inefficiencies" due in large part to the lack of modern technology. This resulted in increased fuel consumption as well as adding to the economic plight of their owners. With these inefficiencies, noticeable drop in travel occurred from an "average of nearly 3000 km/year in the mid-1980s to less than 800 km/year in 2000–2001". As the Cuban people try to save as much money as possible, when traveling is done, the cars are usually loaded past the maximum allowable weight and travel on the decaying roads, resulting in even more abuse to the already under-maintained vehicles.

=== Hitchhiking and carpooling ===
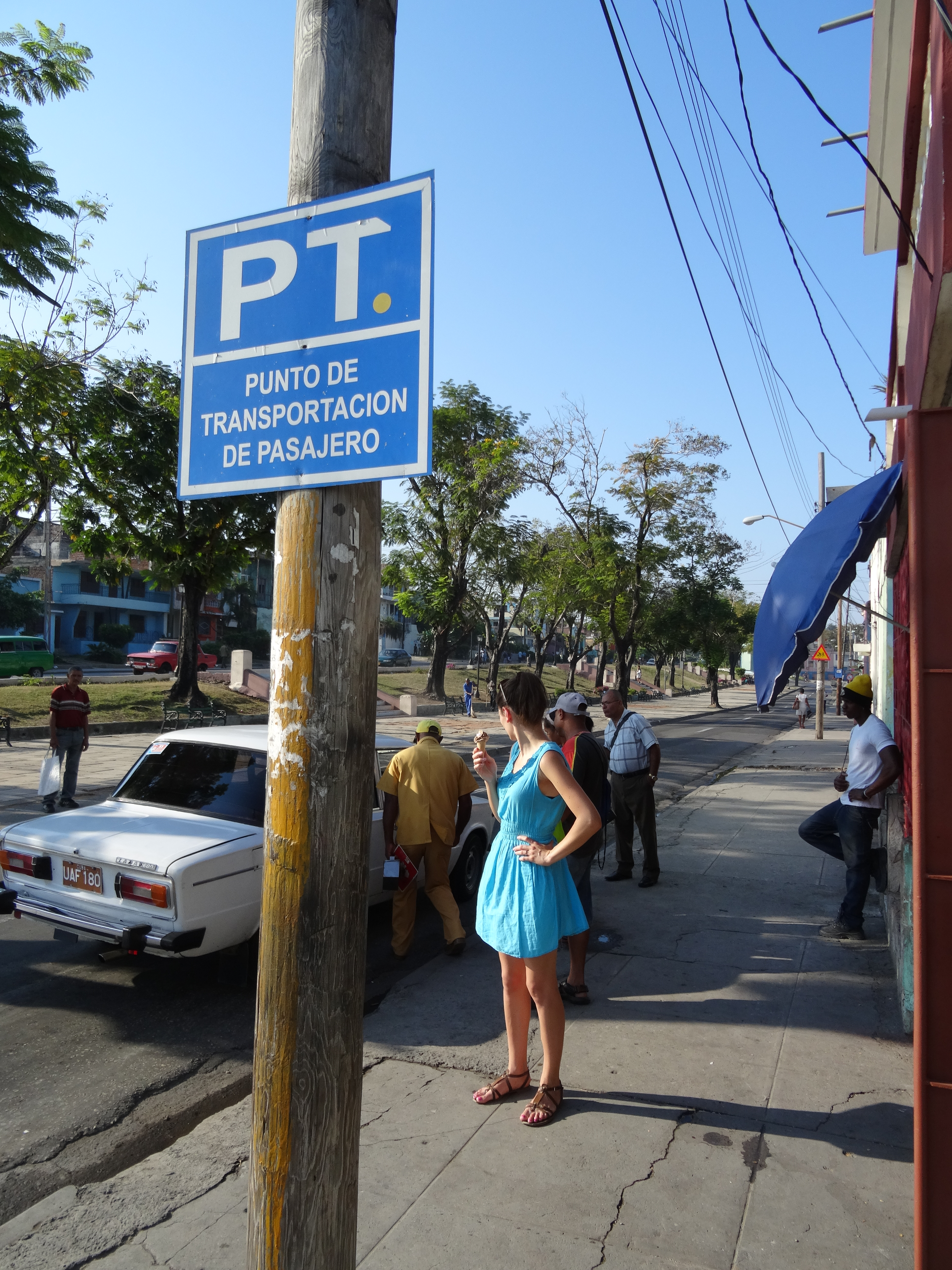
Official hitchhiking and carpooling point, Santiago de Cuba. The man in the yellow uniform stops a state-owned car to take passengers for a small fee

As a result of the "Special Period" in 1991 (a period of food and energy shortages caused by the loss of the Soviet Union as a trading partner), hitchhiking and carpooling became important parts of Cuba's transportation system and society in general. In 1999, an article in Time magazine claimed "In Cuba[...] hitchhiking is custom. Hitchhiking is essential. Hitchhiking is what makes Cuba move."

=== Changes in the 2000s ===
For many years, Cubans could only acquire new cars with special permission.

In 2011, the Cuban government legalized the purchase and sale of used post-1959 autos. In December 2013, Cubans were allowed to buy new cars from state-run dealerships – previously this had not been permitted.

In 2020, this was further extended with cars being sold in convertible currencies.

== Waterways ==
- Cauto River
- Sagua la Grande River

== Ports and harbors ==
- Cienfuegos
- Havana
- Manzanillo
- Mariel
- Matanzas
- Nuevitas
- Santiago de Cuba

== Merchant marine ==
Total: 3 ships

=== Ships by type ===
- Cargo ships (1)
- Passenger ship (1)
- Refrigerated cargo ships (1)

Registered in other countries: 5

== Airlines ==
Besides the state owned airline Cubana (Cubana de Aviación), only Aerogavitoa operates flights to and within Cuba.

== Airports ==
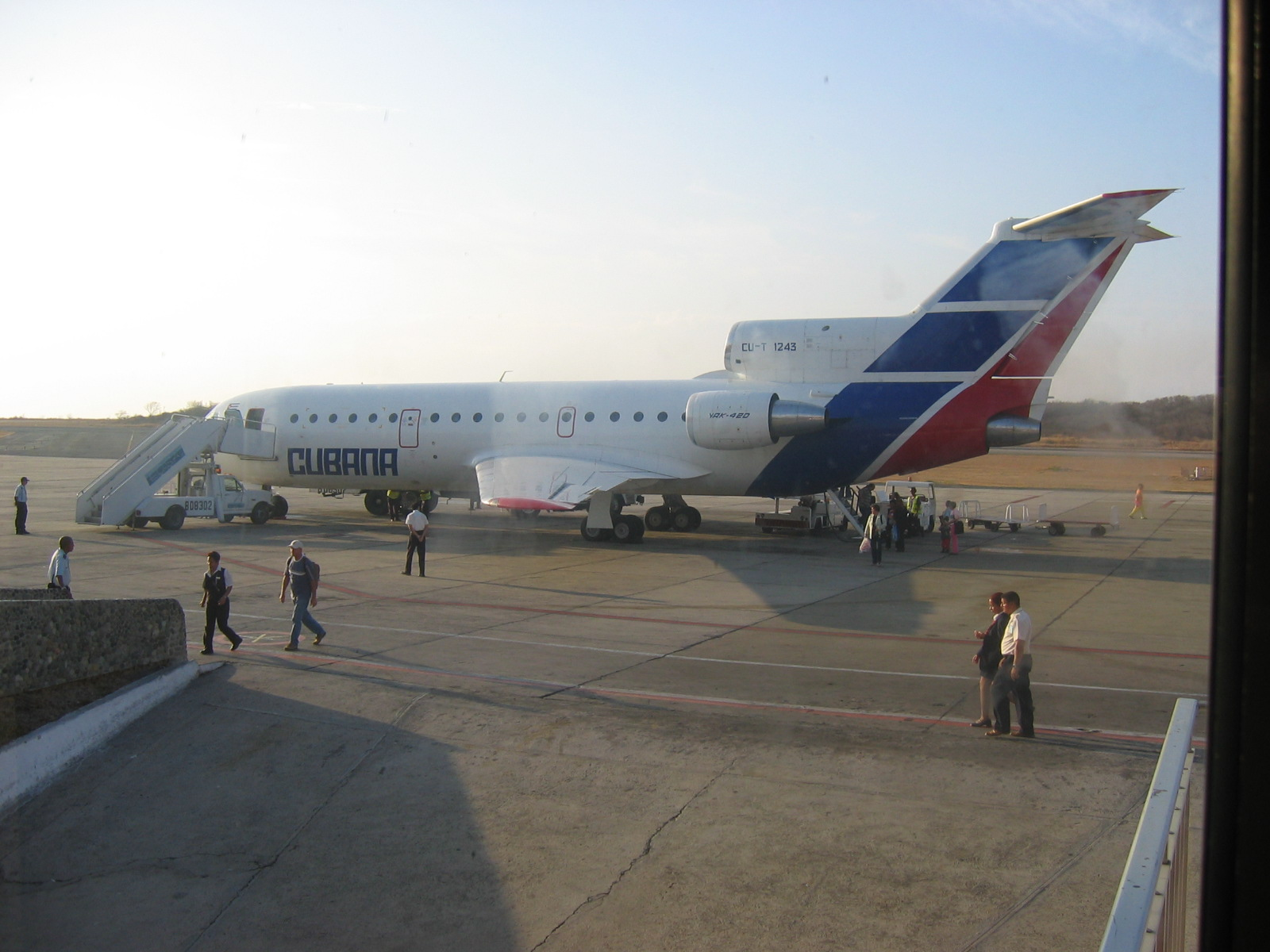
A YAK-42 of Cubana at Antonio Maceo Airport

- Total: 133

=== Airports with paved runways ===
- total: 64
- over 3,047 m: 7
- 2,438 to 3,047 m: 10
- 1,524 to 2,437 m: 16
- 914 to 1,523 m: 4
- under 914 m: 27

=== Airports with unpaved runways ===
- total: 69
- 914 to 1,523 m: 11
- under 914 m: 58

== See also ==
- Infrastructure of Cuba
- Trailer bus
- Transit bus

== Gallery ==
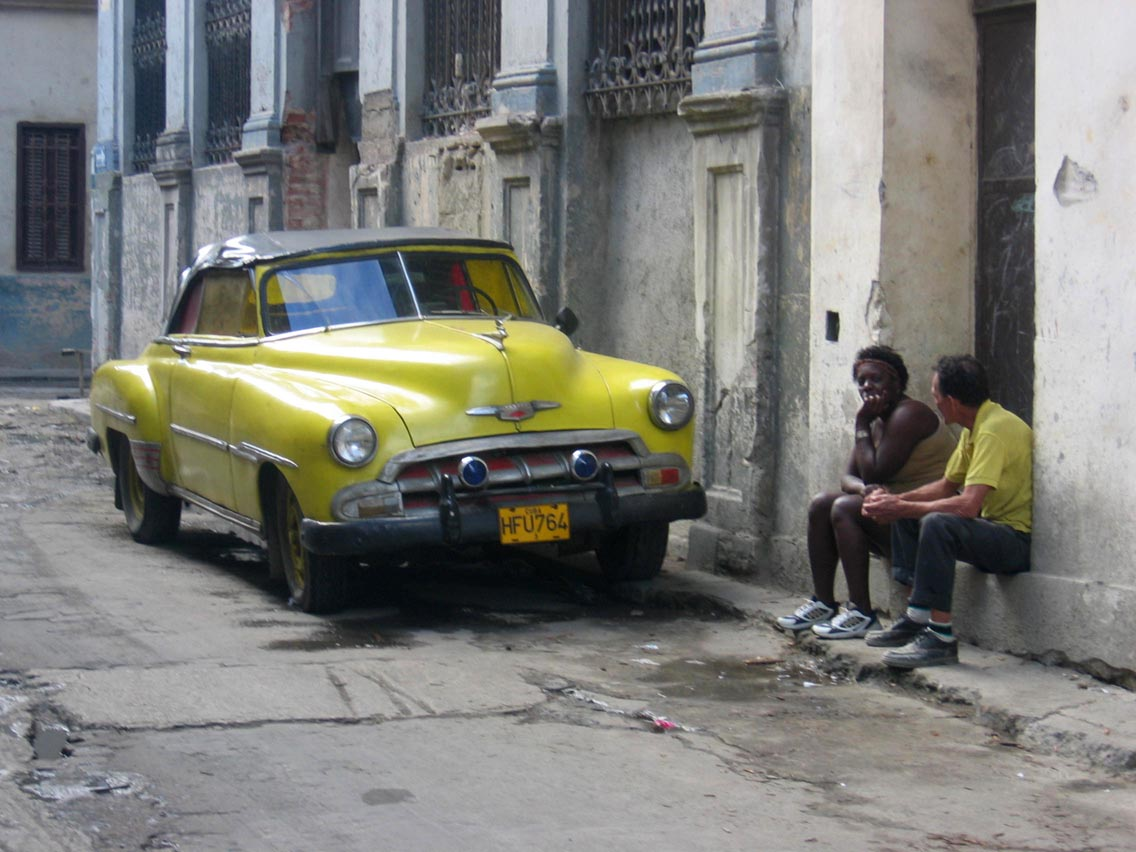
1952 Chevrolet in Havana

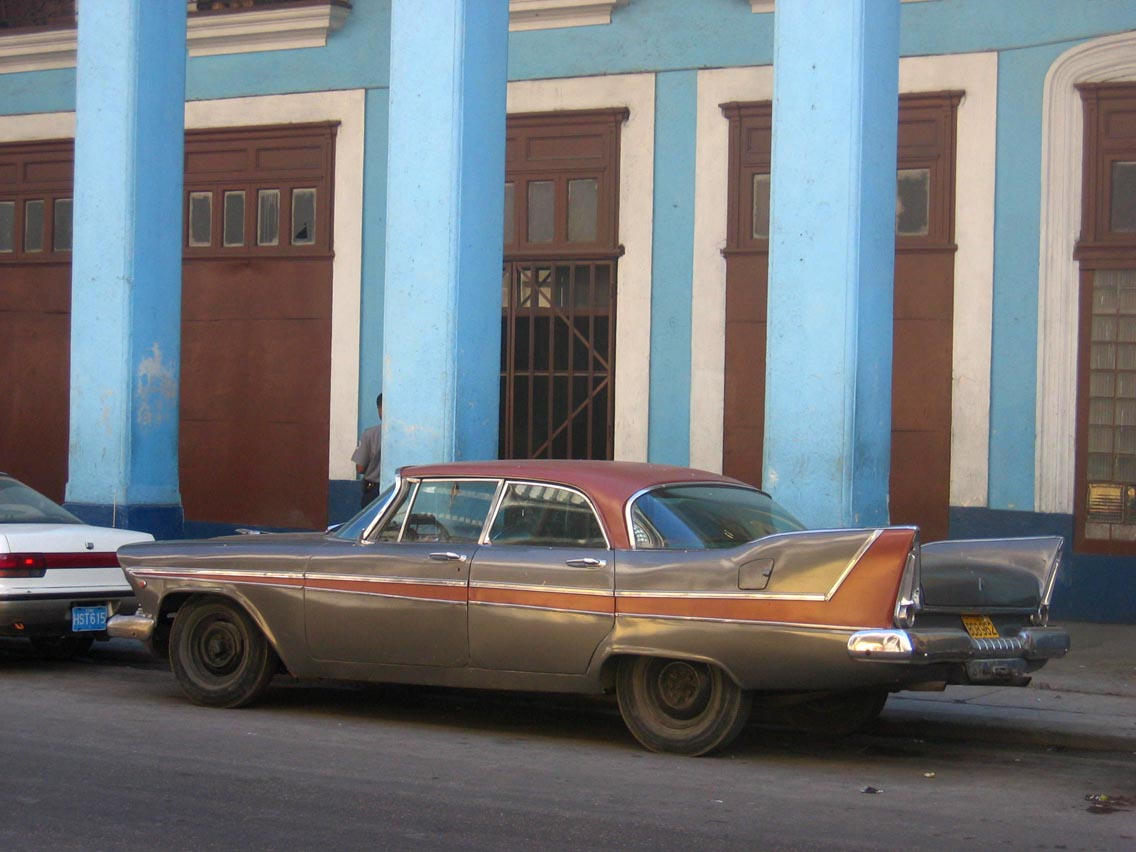
1958 Plymouth Belvedere in Havana

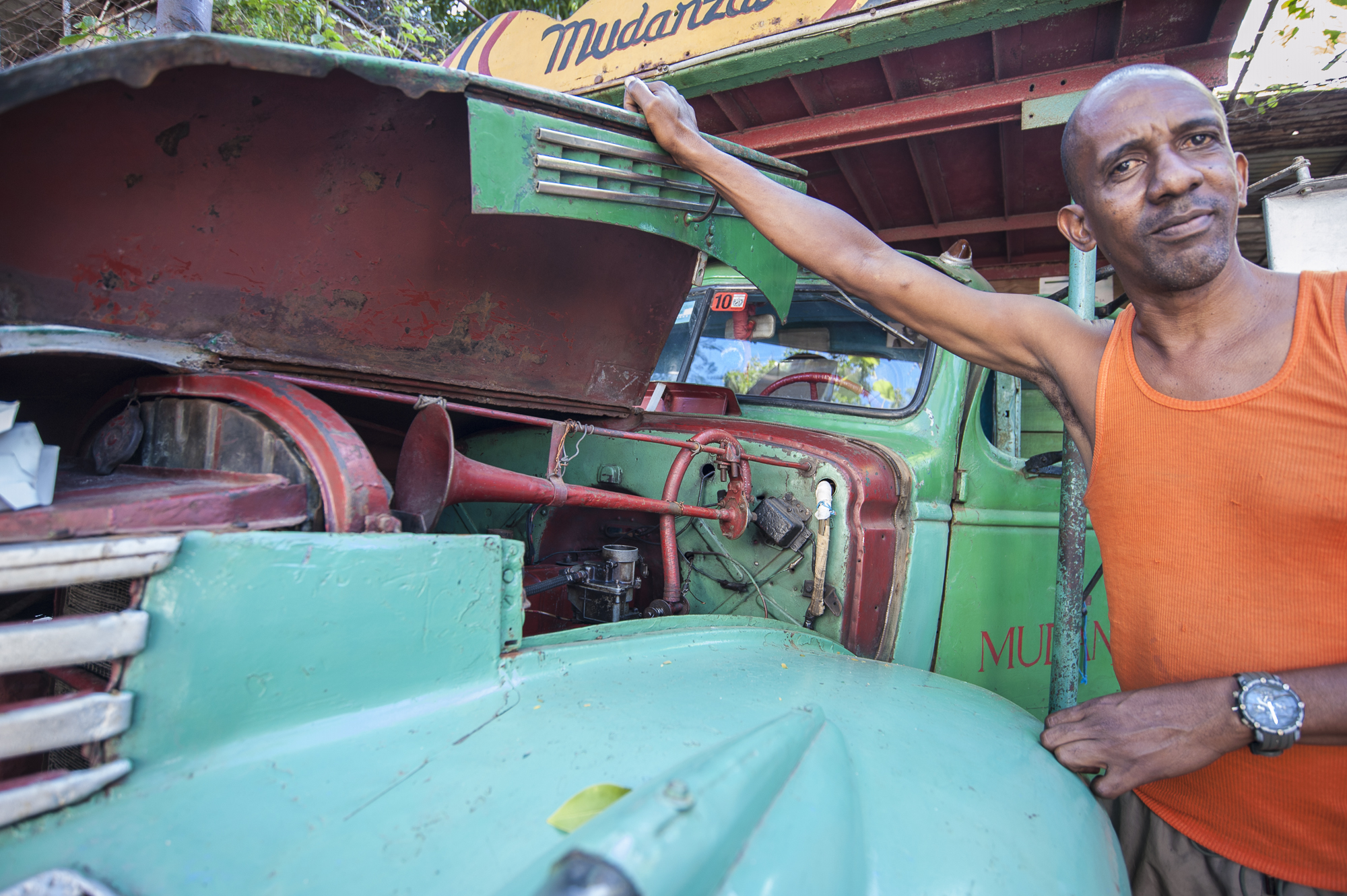
Antique Ford Truck, Jan 2014

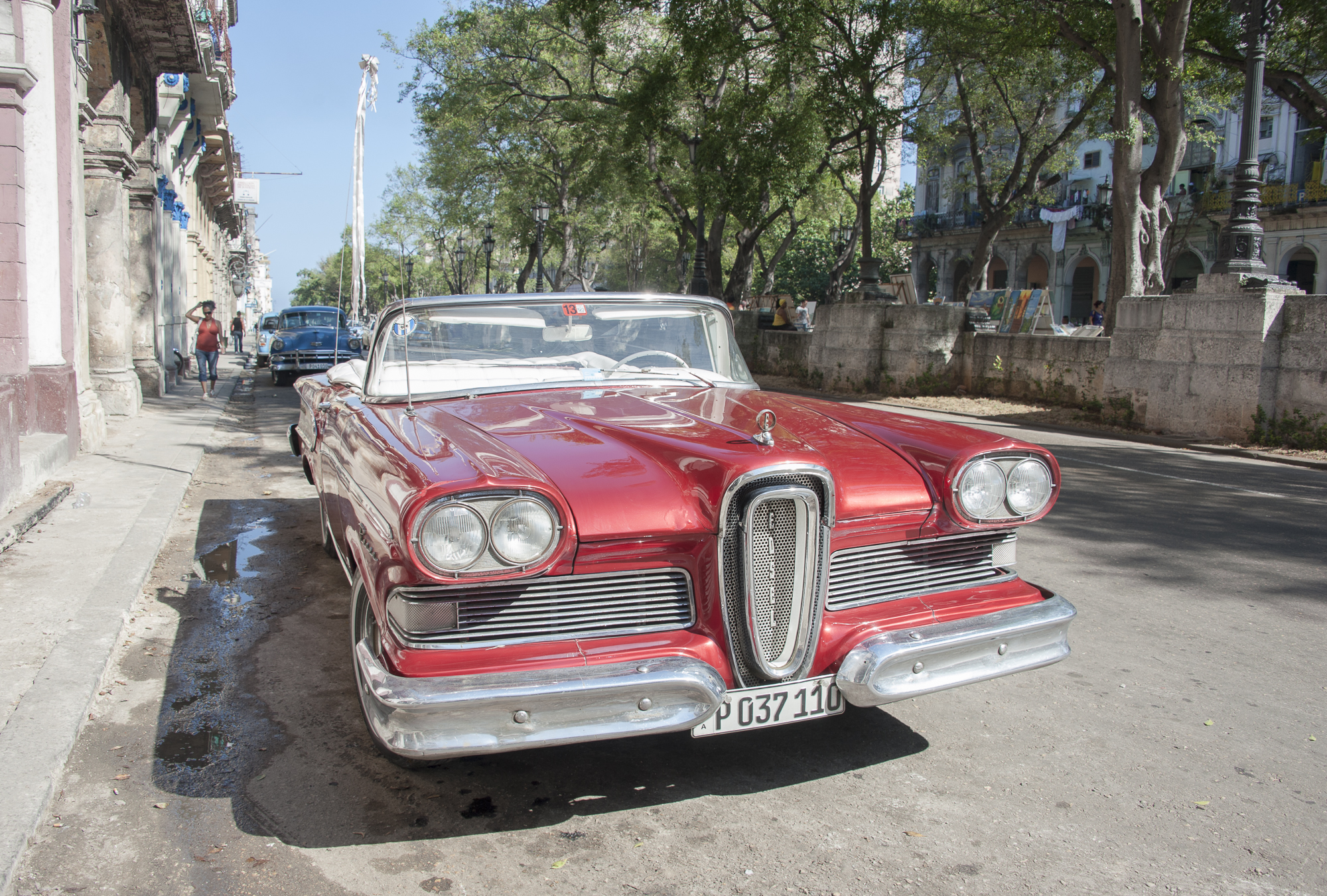
Edsel Pacer in Havana, Jan 2014

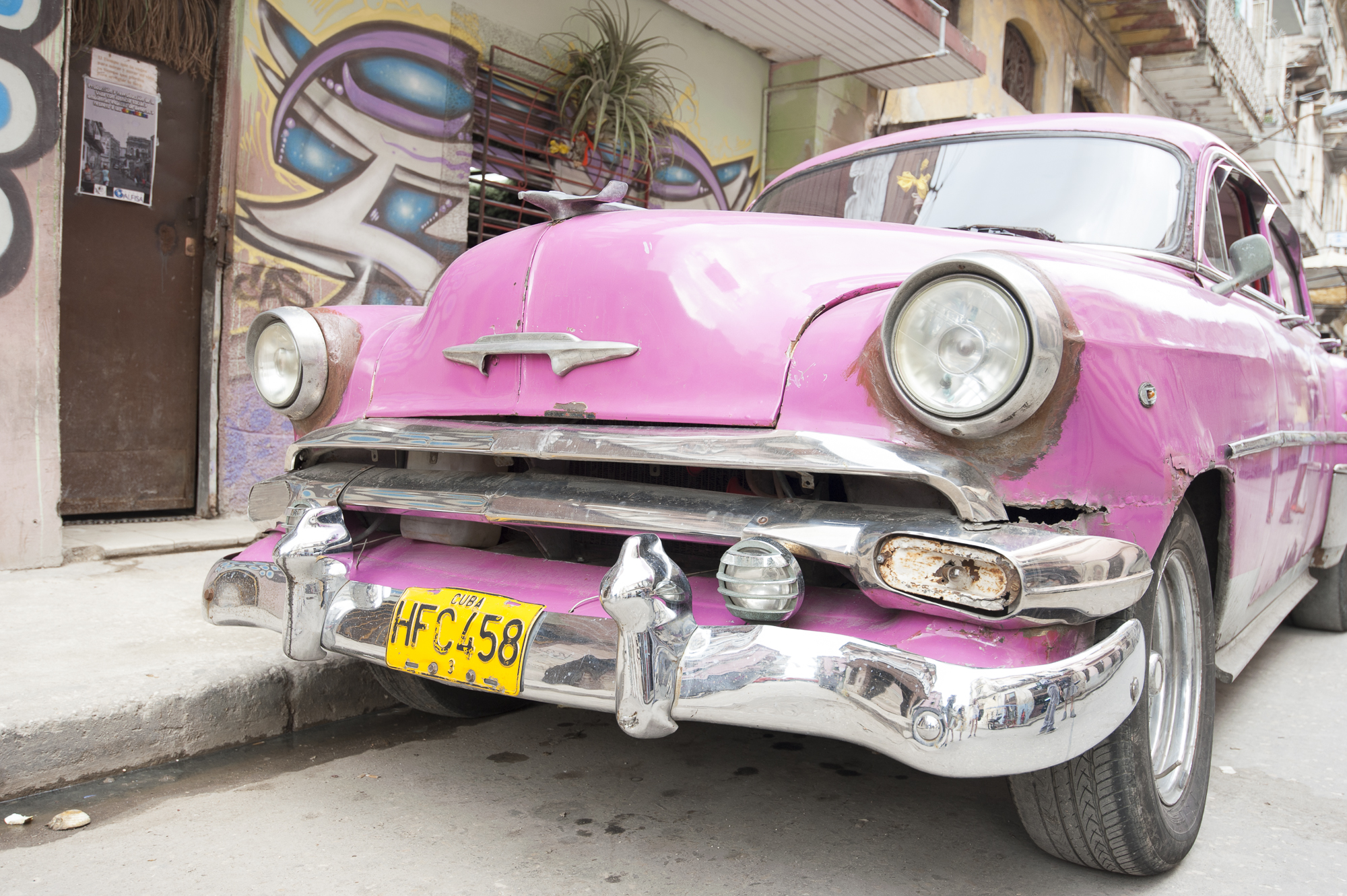
Pink Chevy, Jan 2014

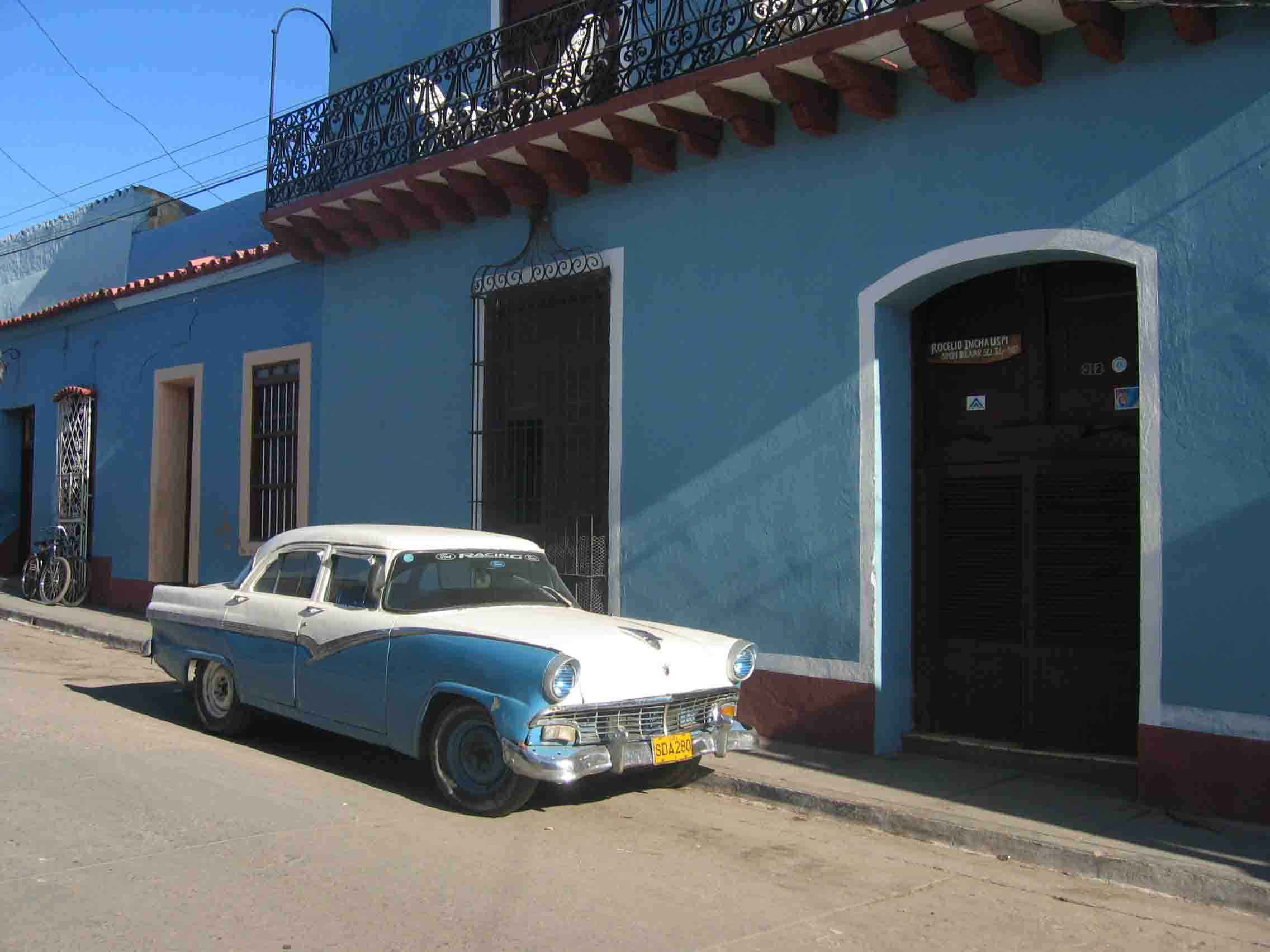
1956 Ford in Trinidad, Cuba.

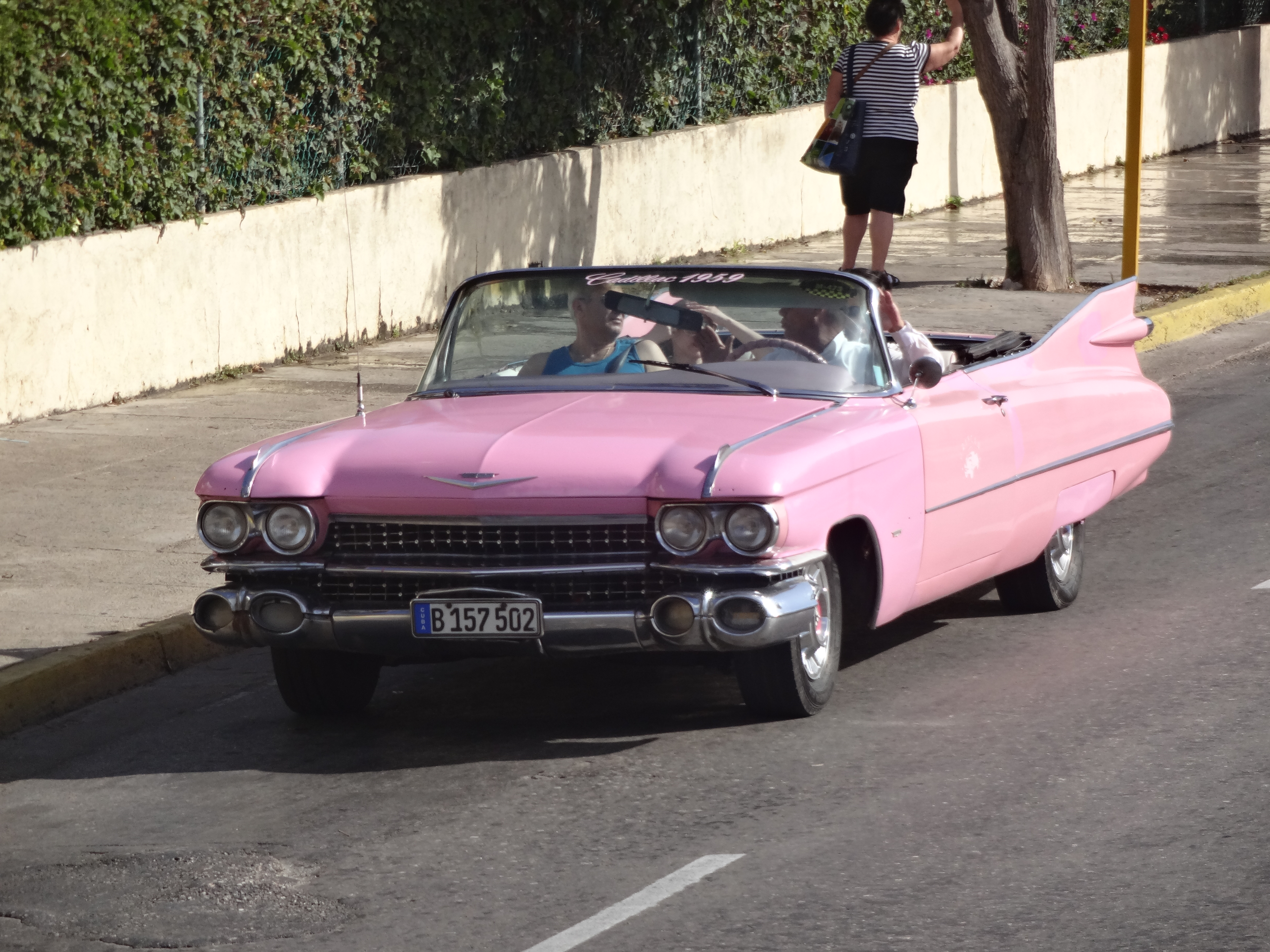
1959 Cadillac in Varadero

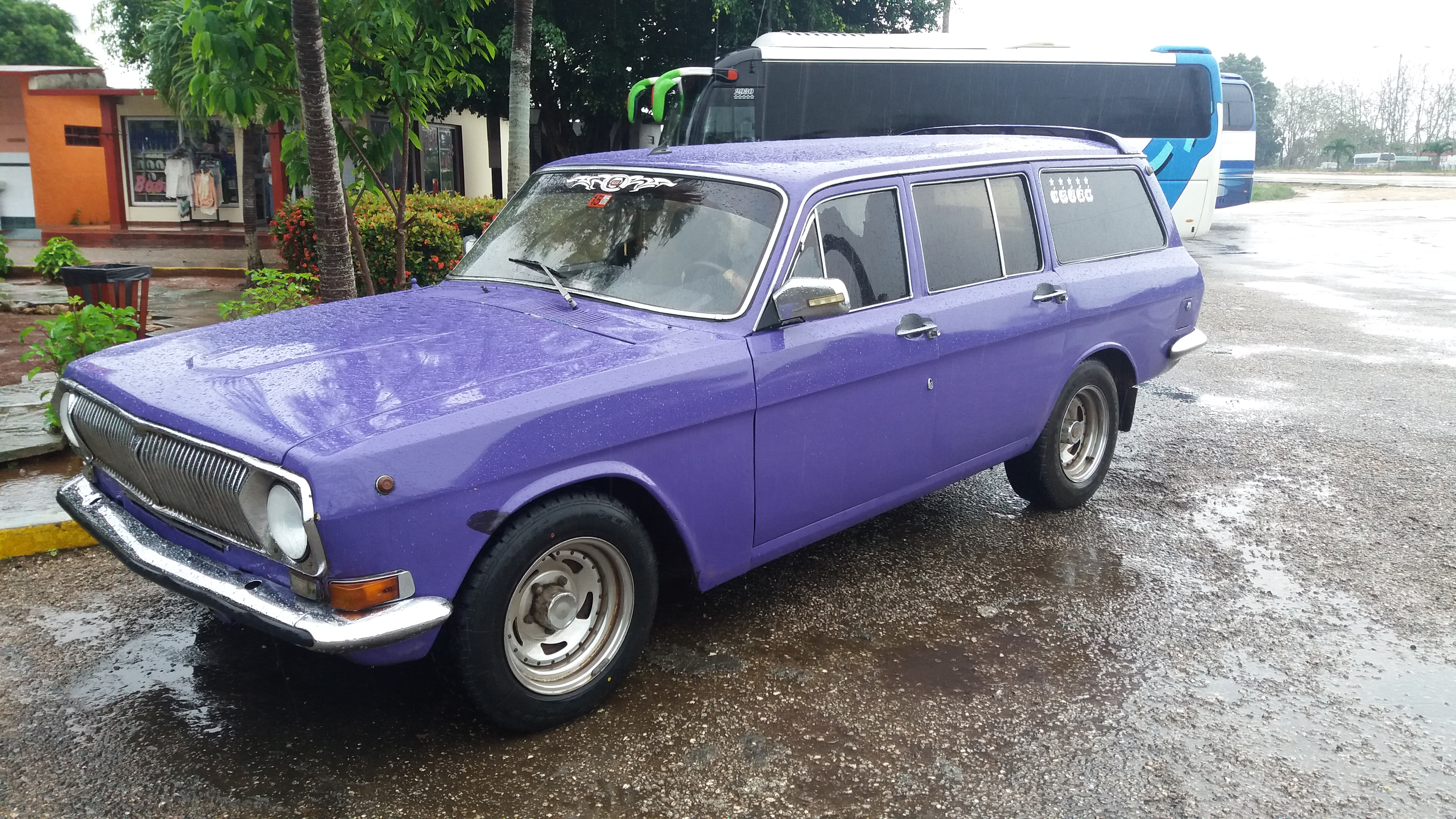
Purple Volga station wagon, May 2018

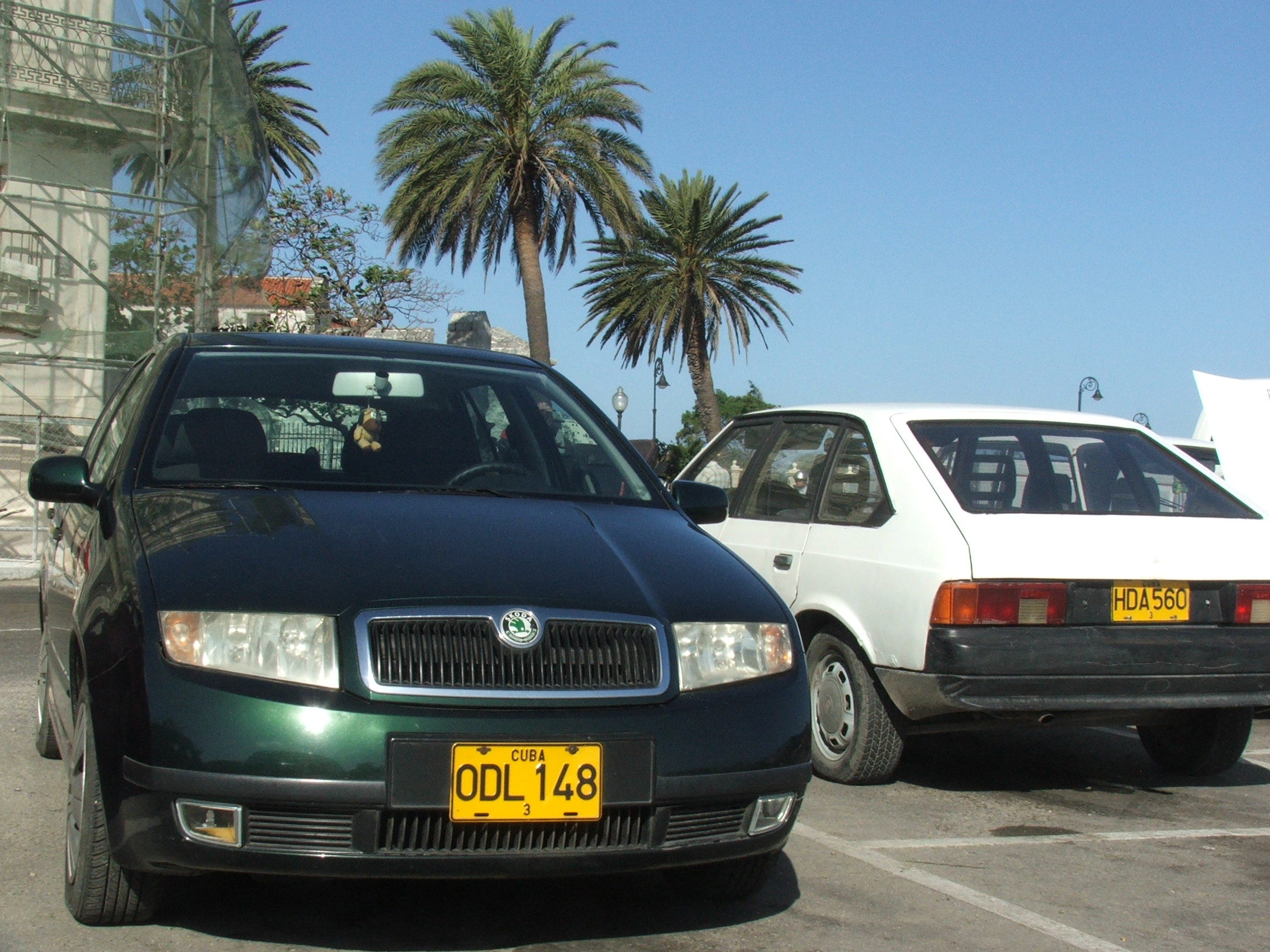
Škoda Fabia I (left) and Moskvitch-2141 "Aleko" (right), Feb 2009

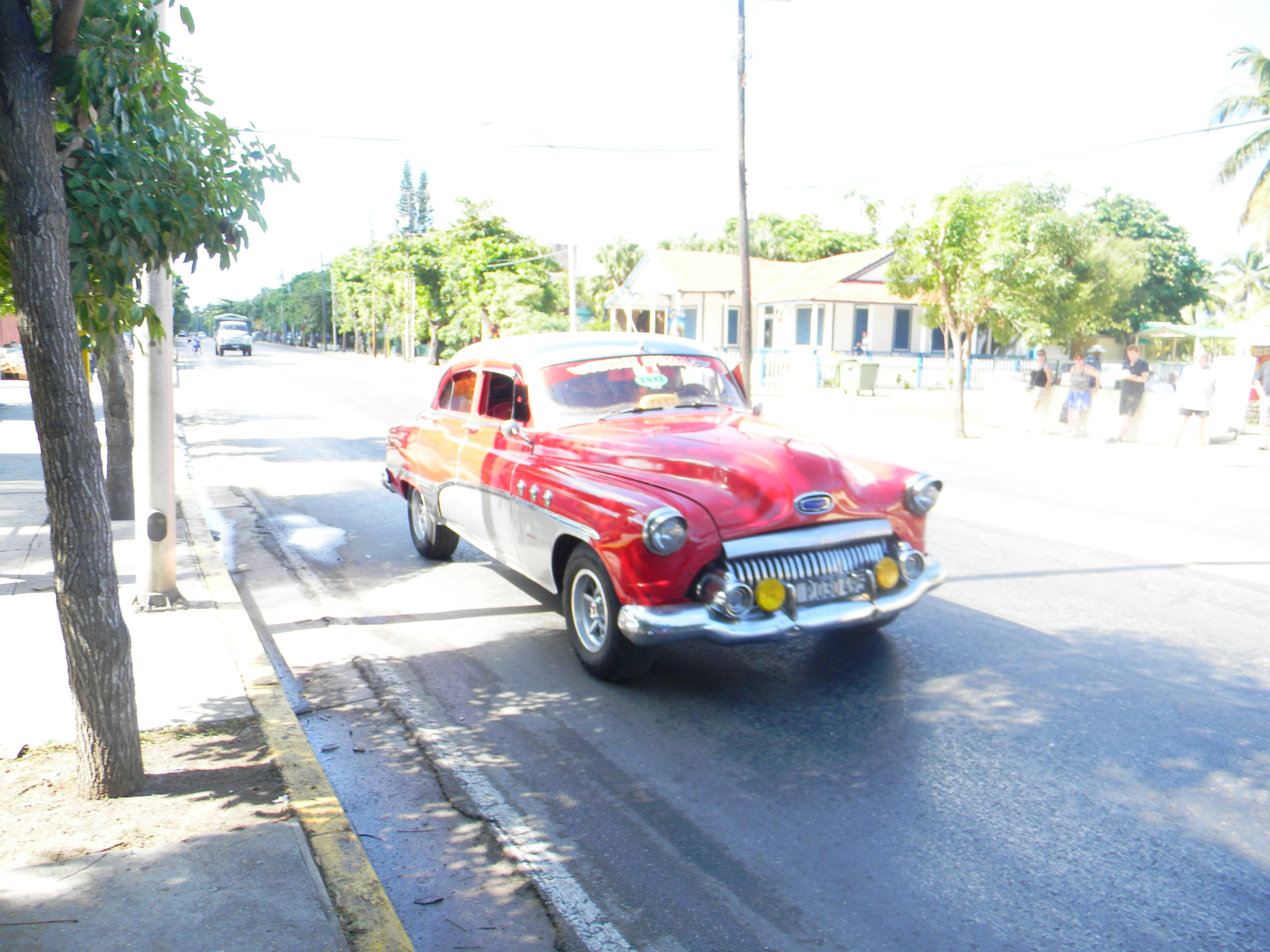
A Buick car in Varadero

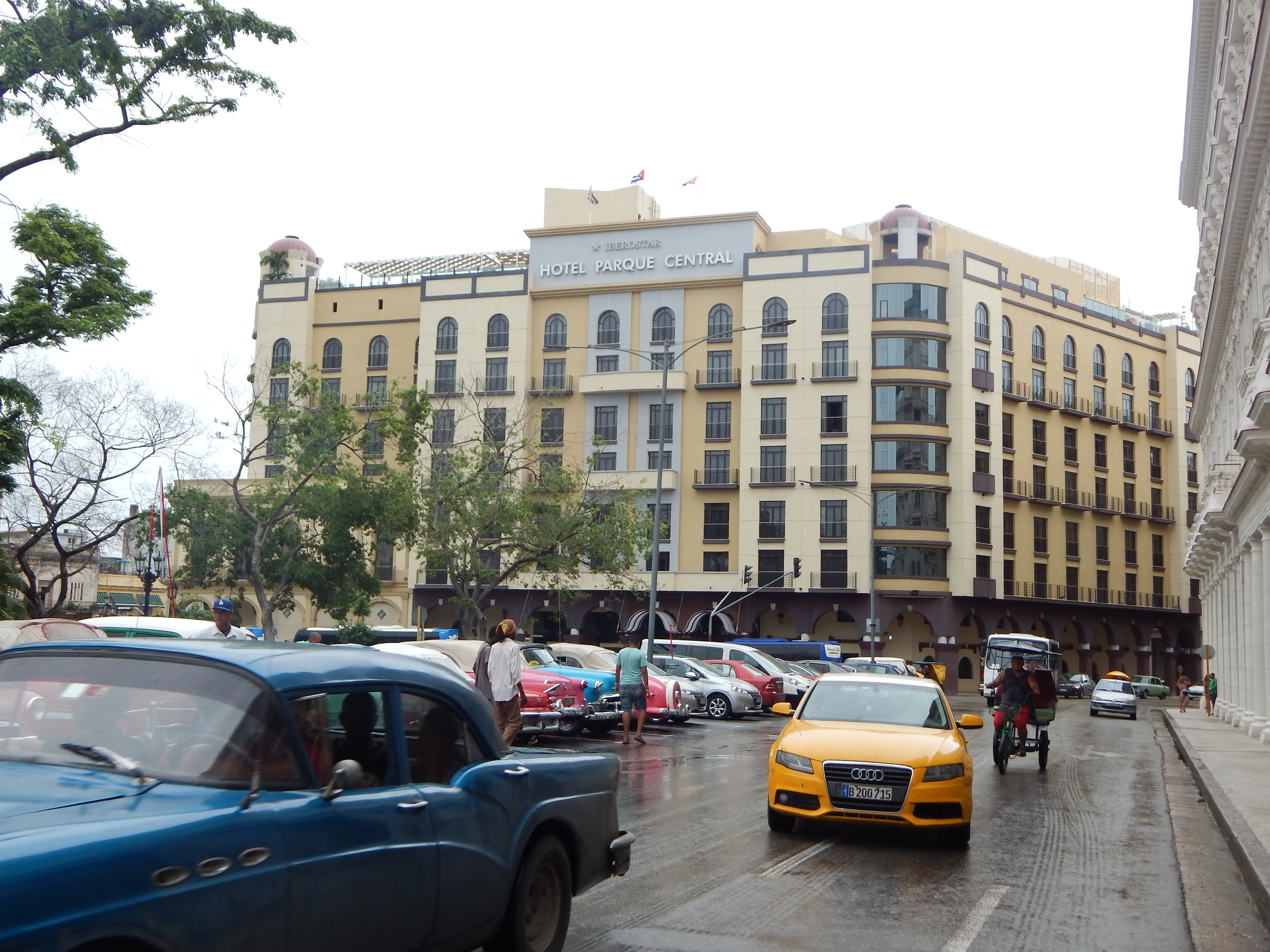
Audi car in Havana, May 2018

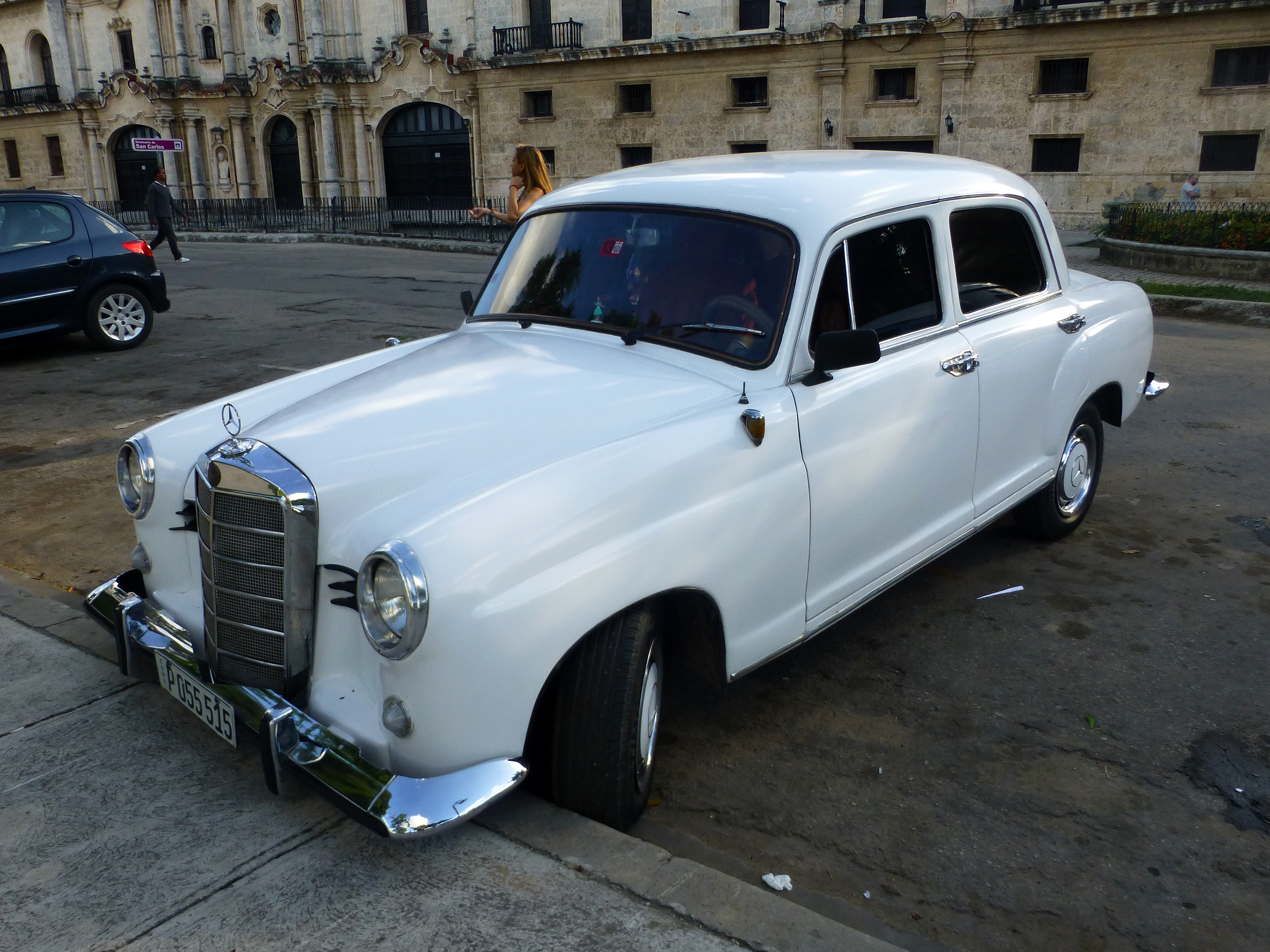
Mercedes-Benz W120 in Havana, Jan 2015

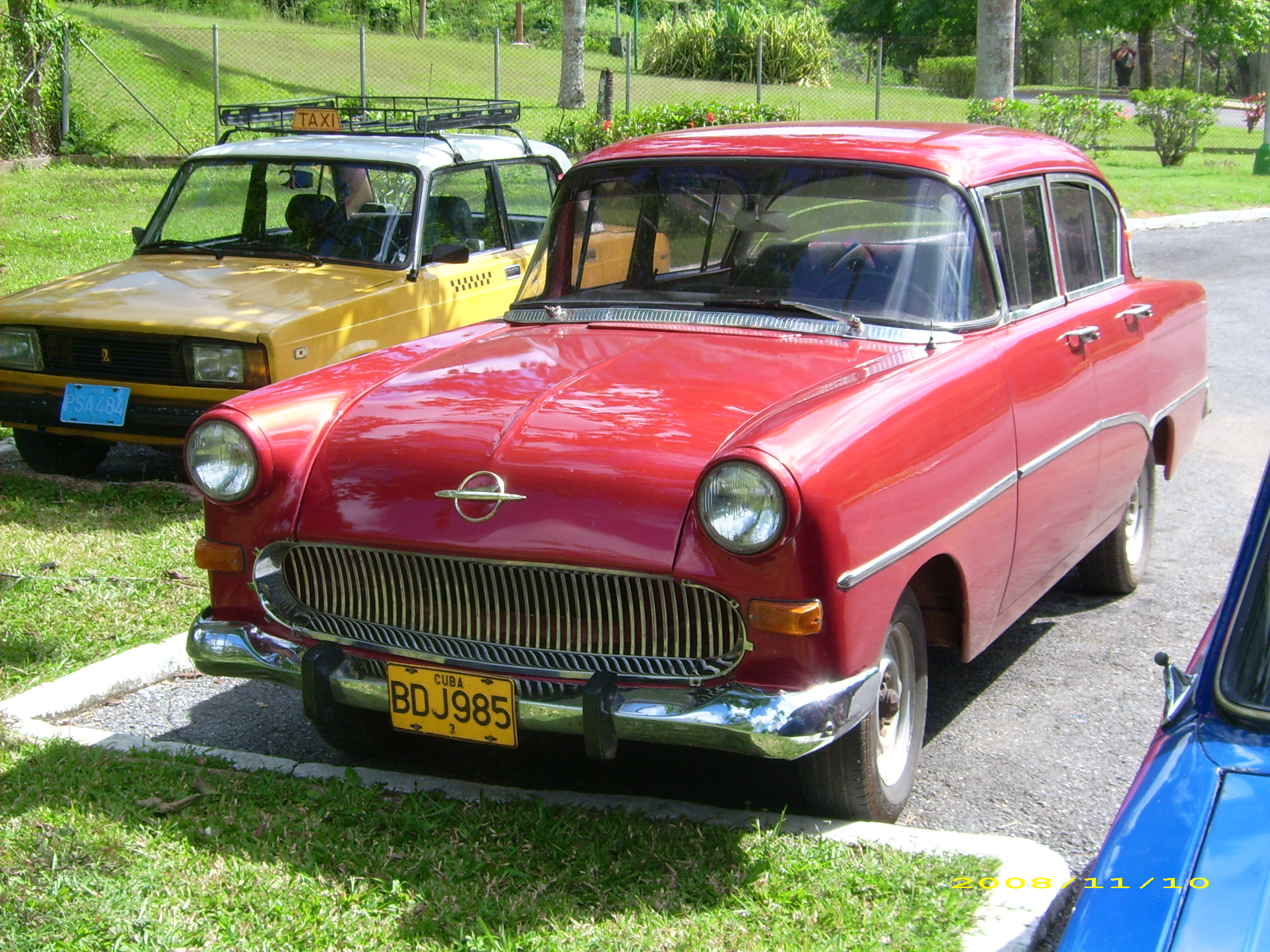
Opel Rekord in Pinar de Río, Nov 2008

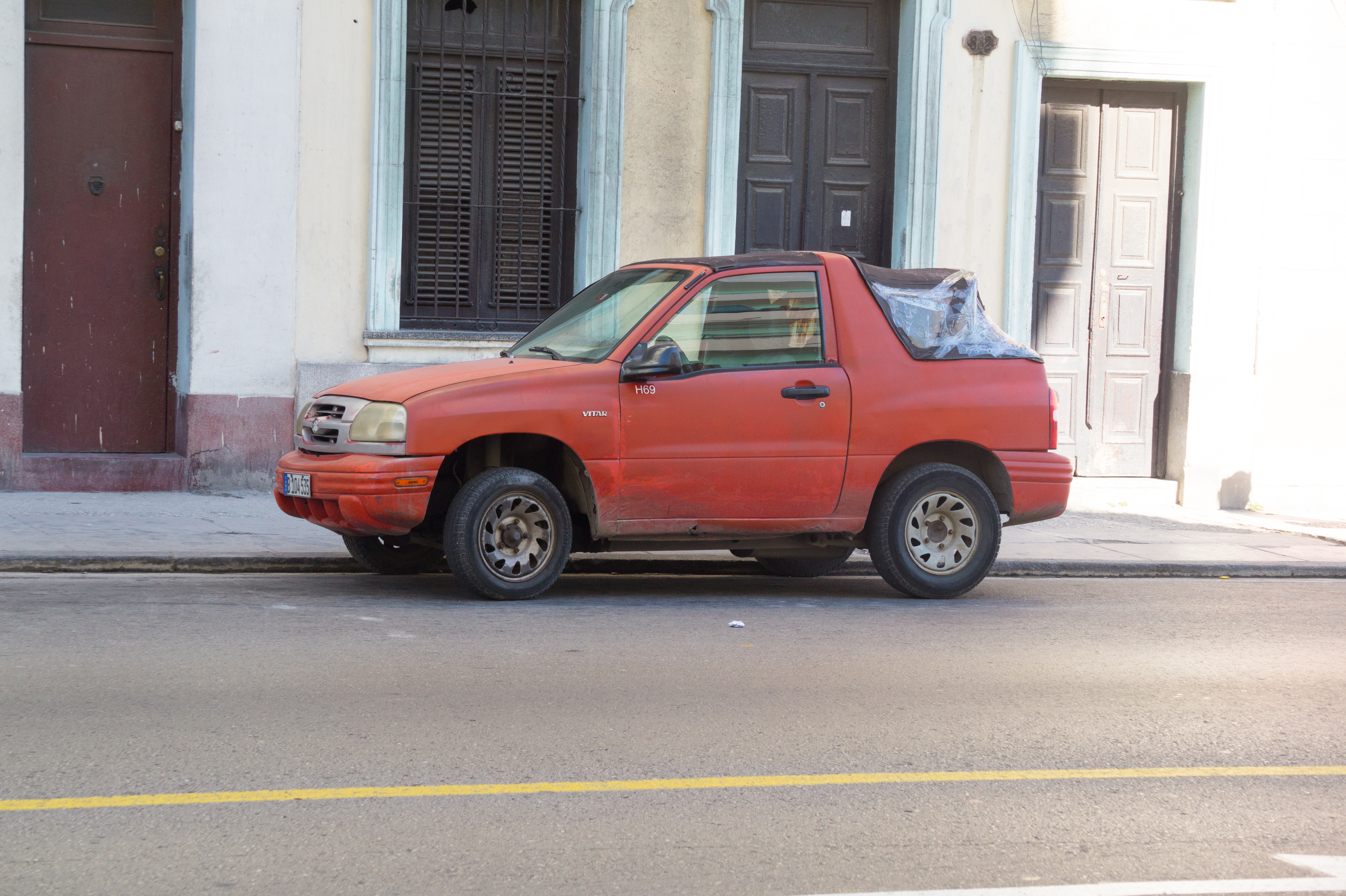
Suzuki Grand Vitara in Havana, Jan 2017

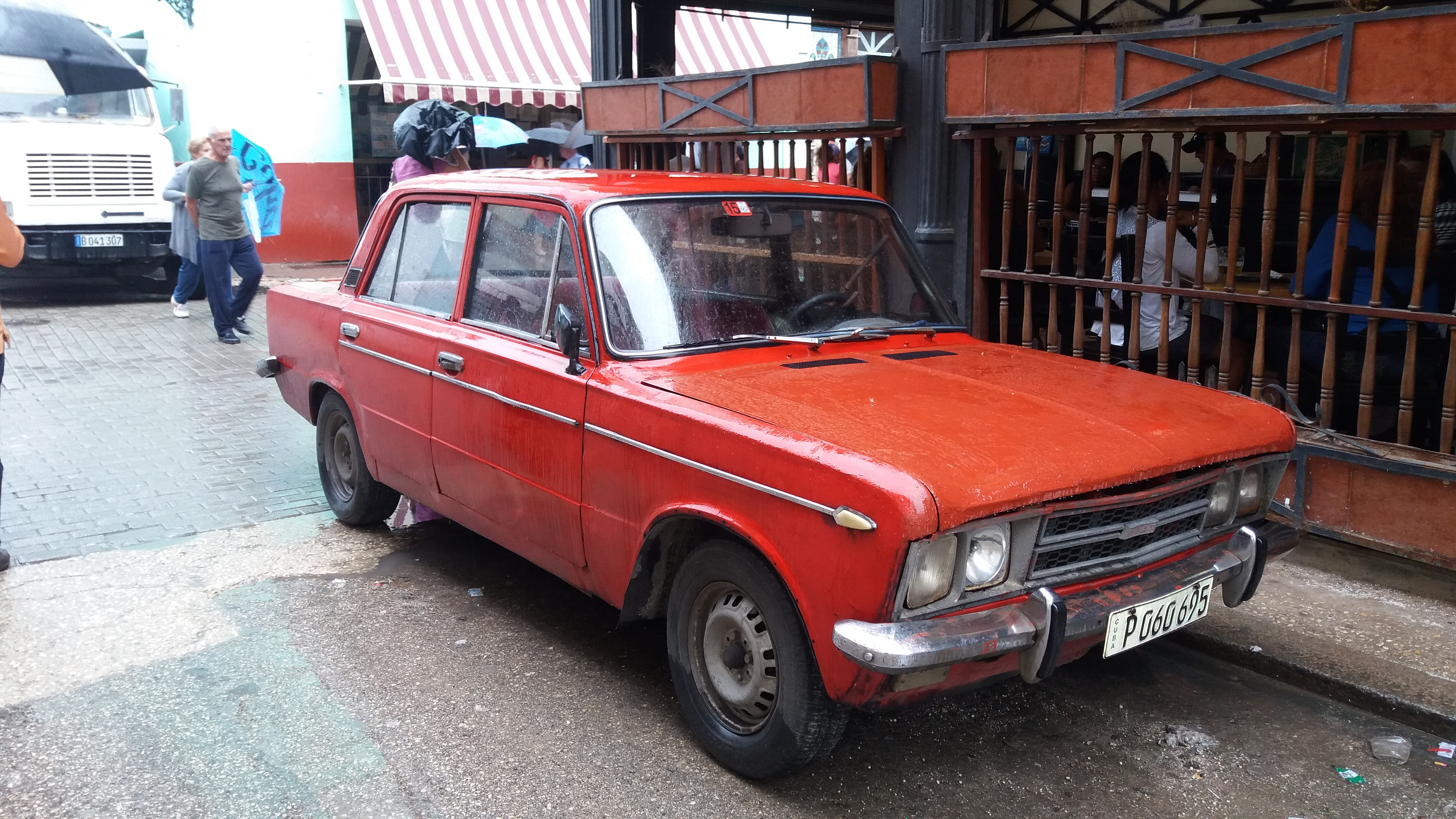
Fiat 125 in Havana, May 2018

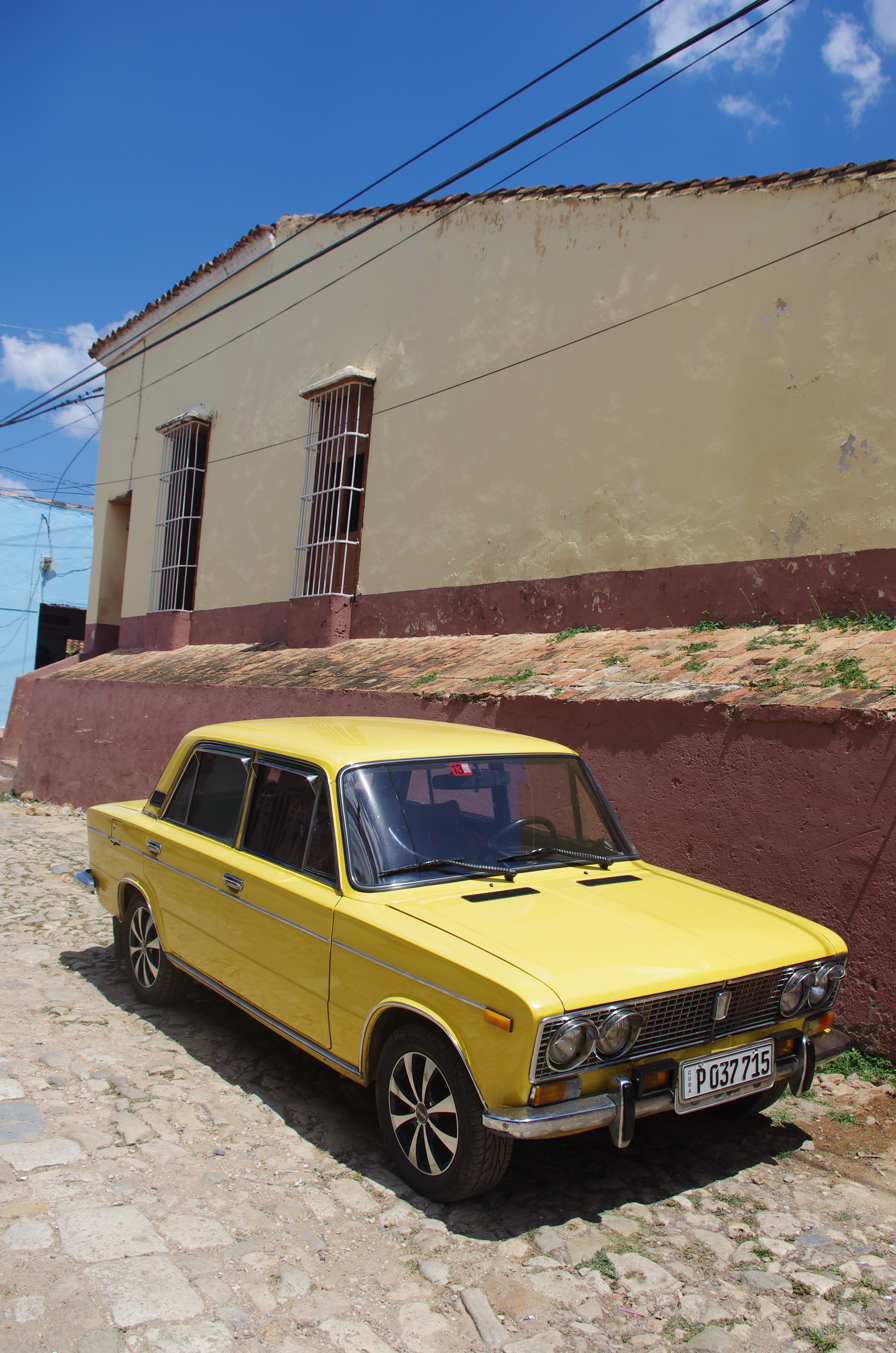
Lada-2103 in Trinidad

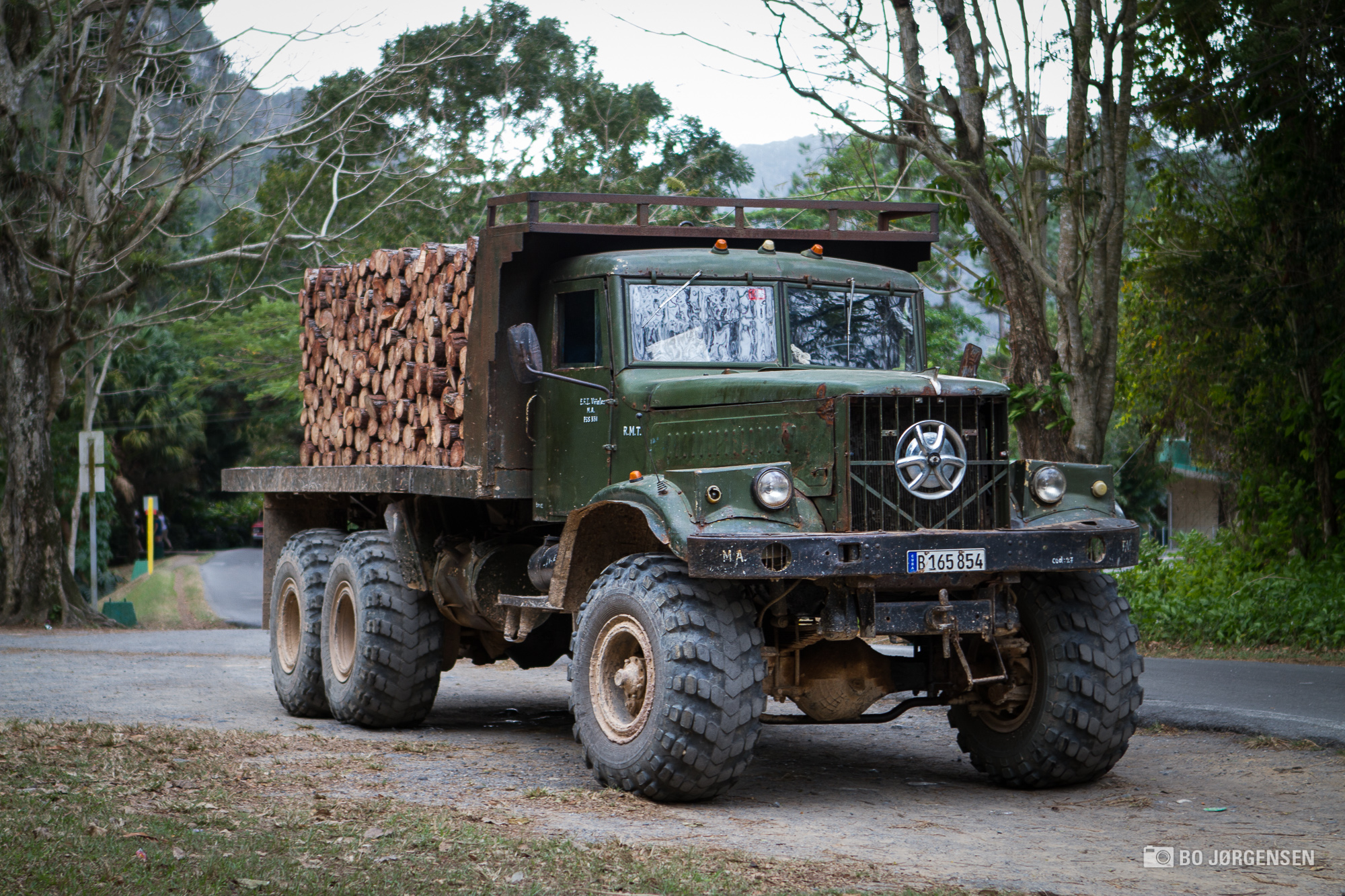
KrAZ-255 truck, Dec 2016

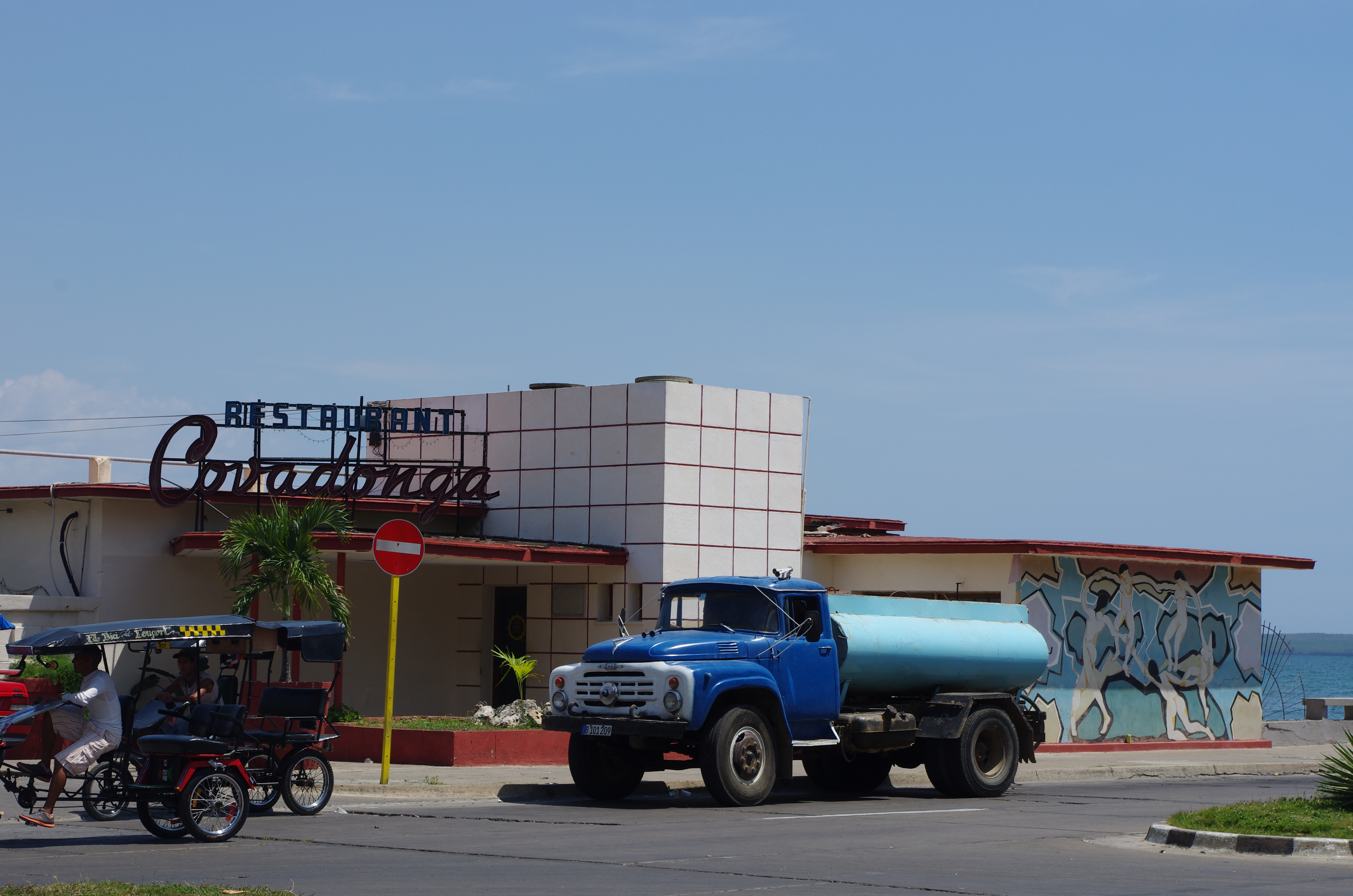
ZiL-130 water tank truck in Cienfuegos

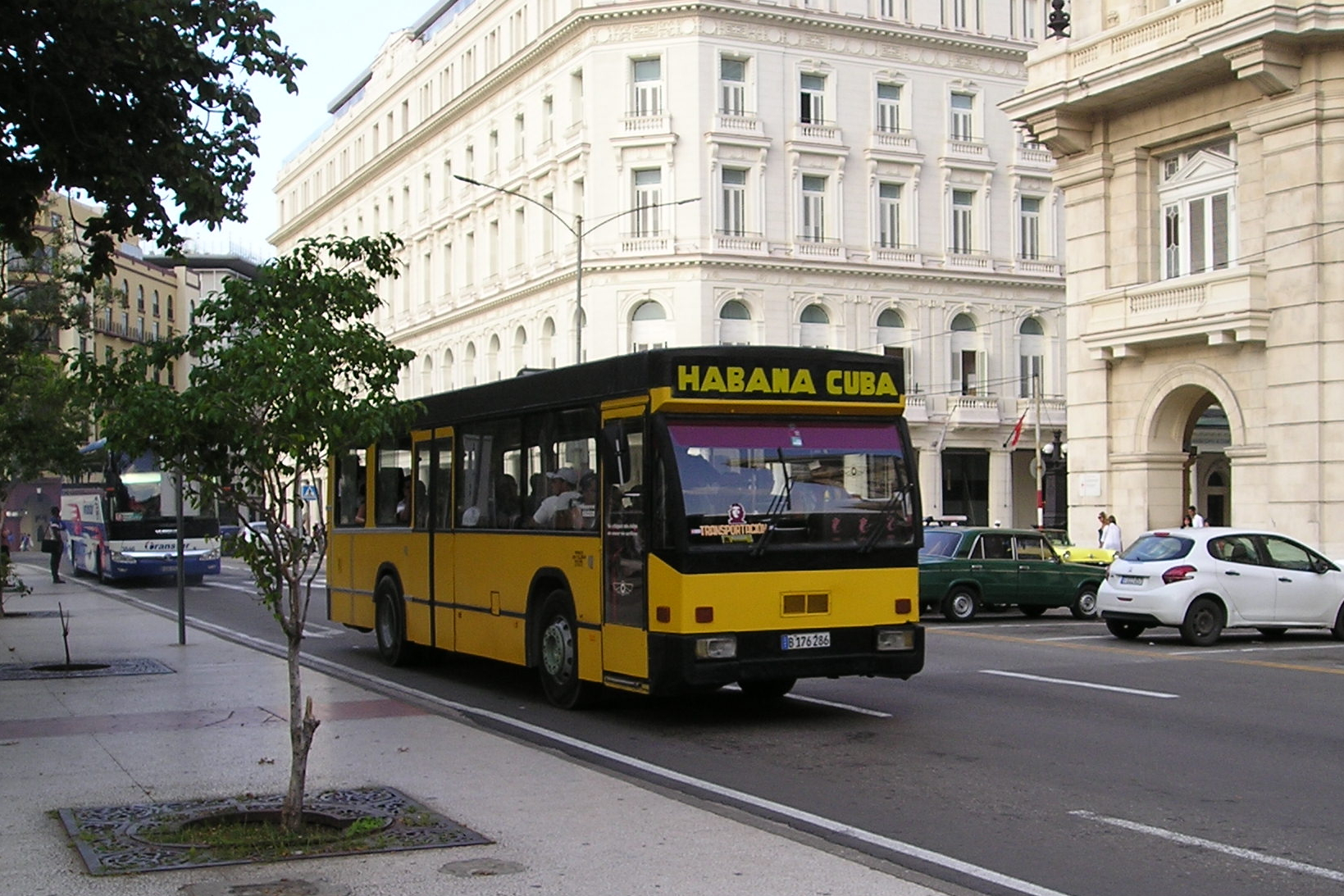
Ex-NHZ Holland Den Oudsten bodied DAF MB230 bus in Havana

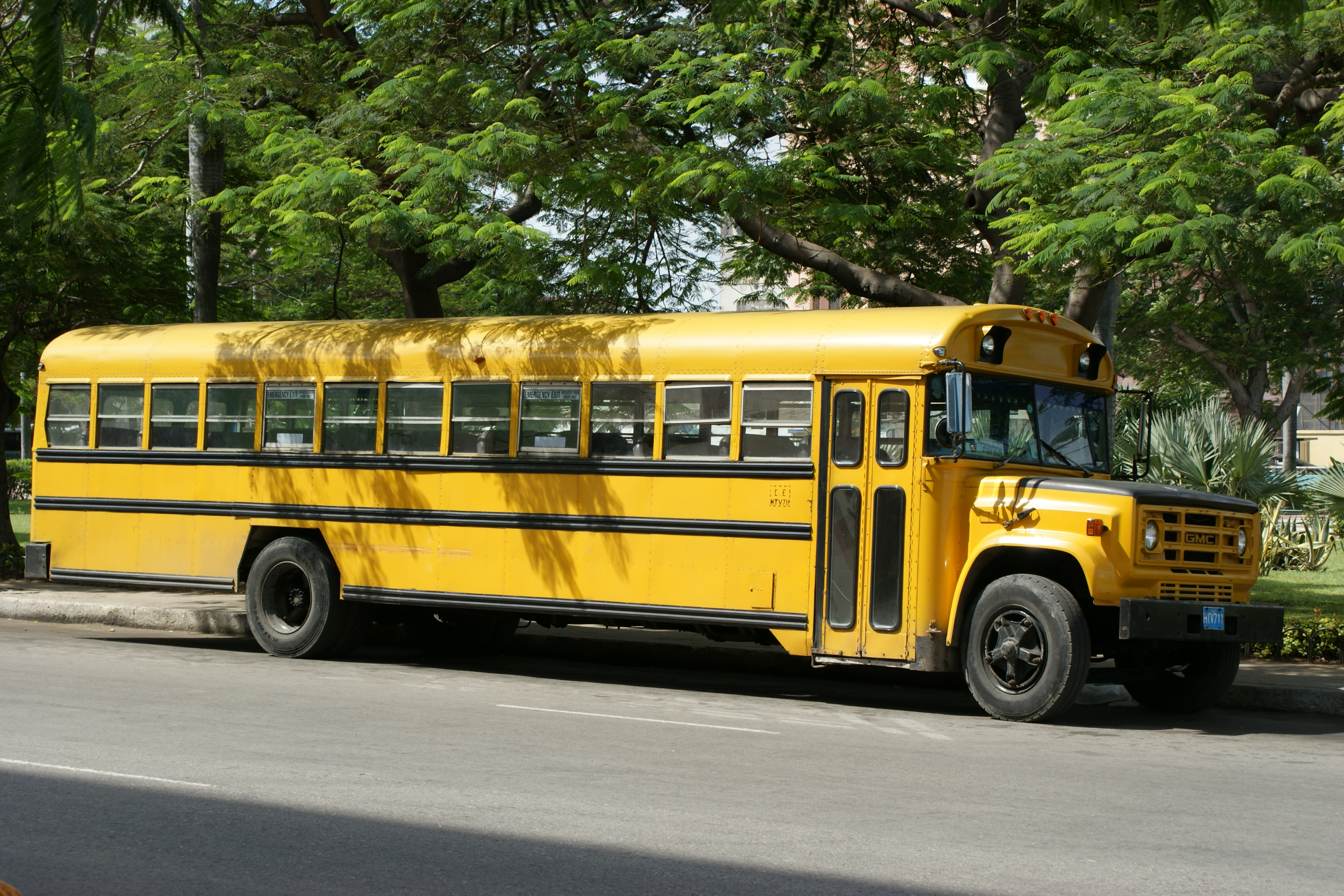
GMC school bus, Oct 2008

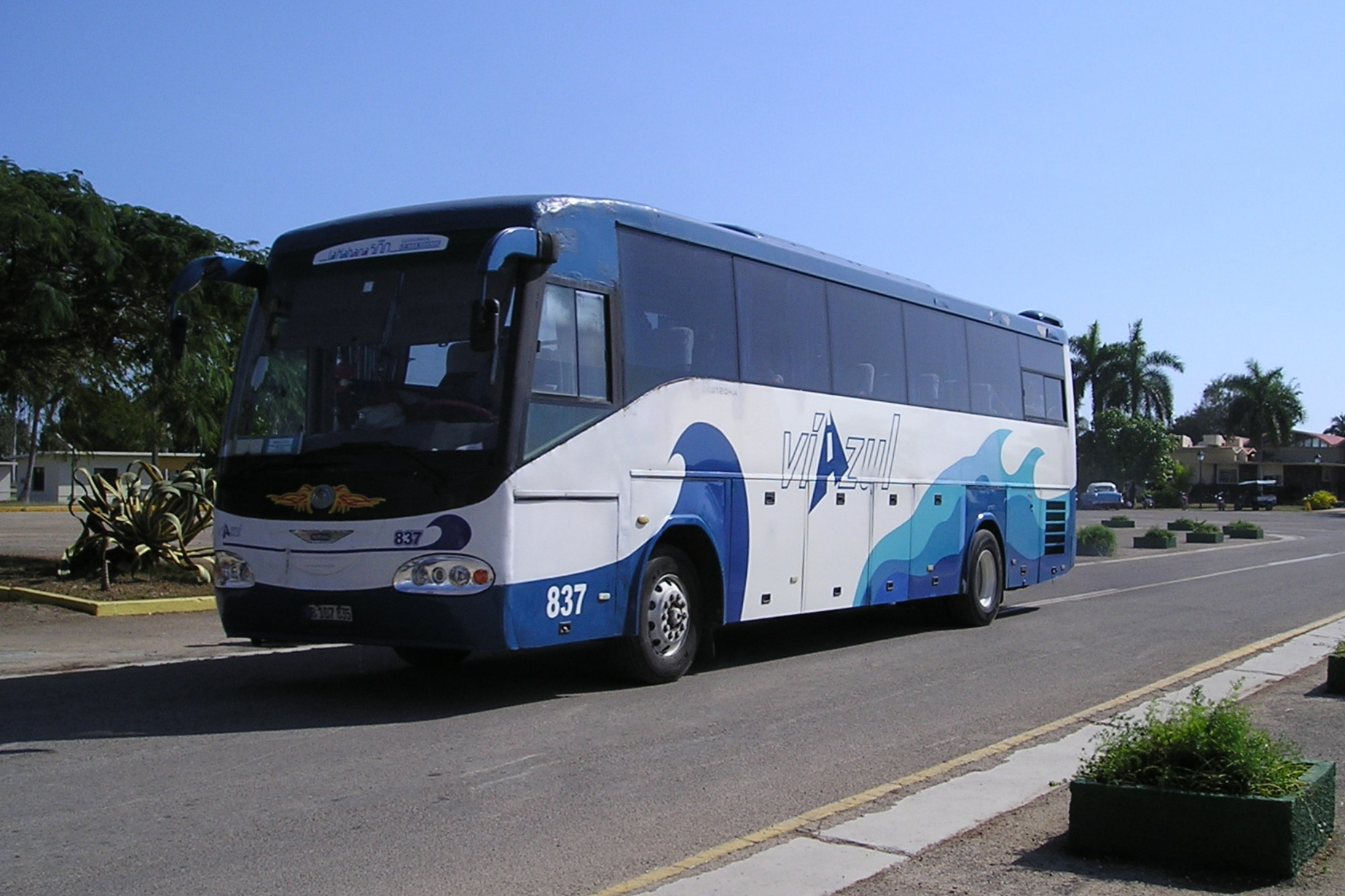
Viazul Yutong ZK6120A coach, Feb 2020

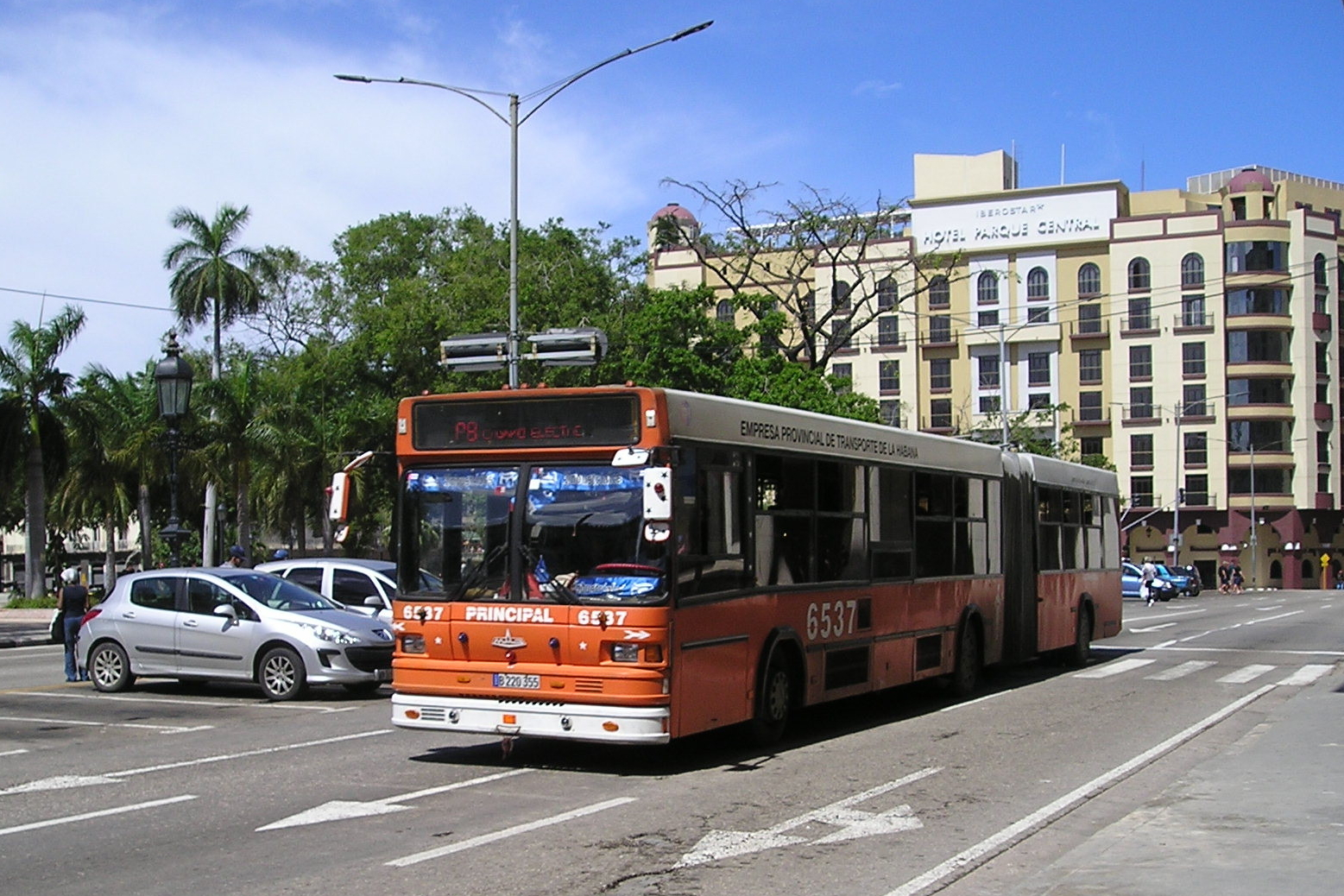
MAZ-105 bus in Havana

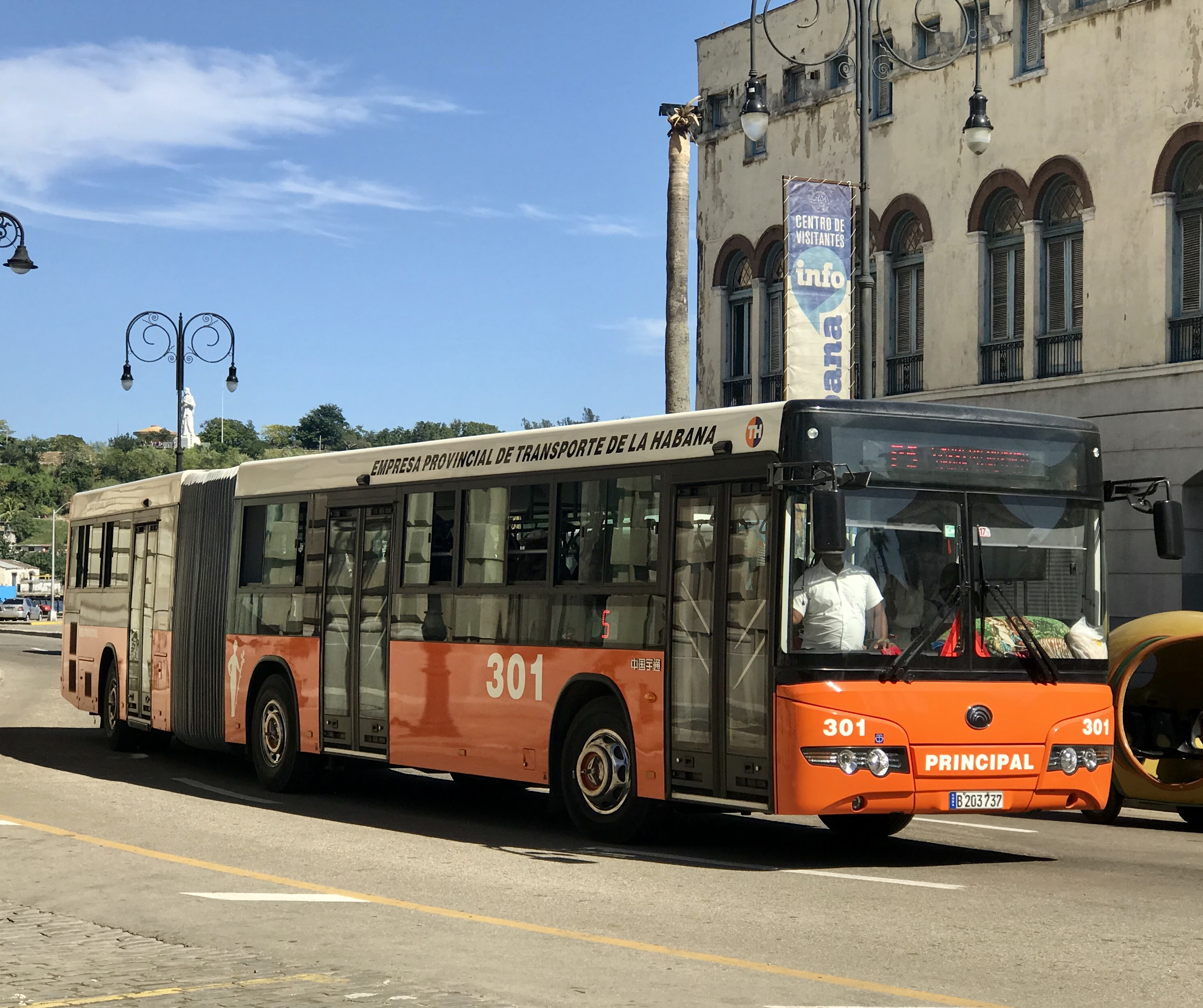
Yutong ZK6180HGC articulated bus in Havana

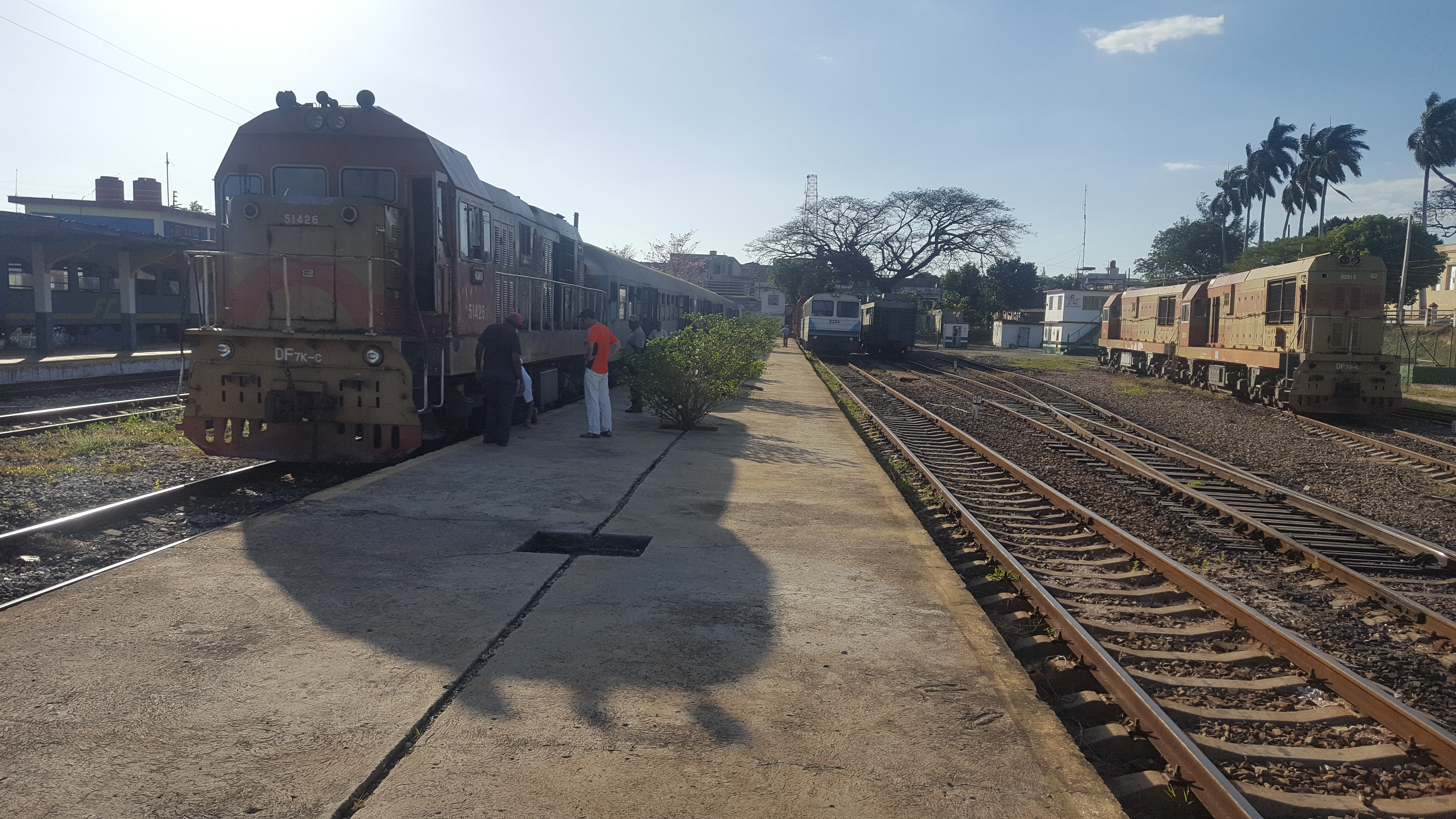
Cienfuegos railroad station, Feb 2019

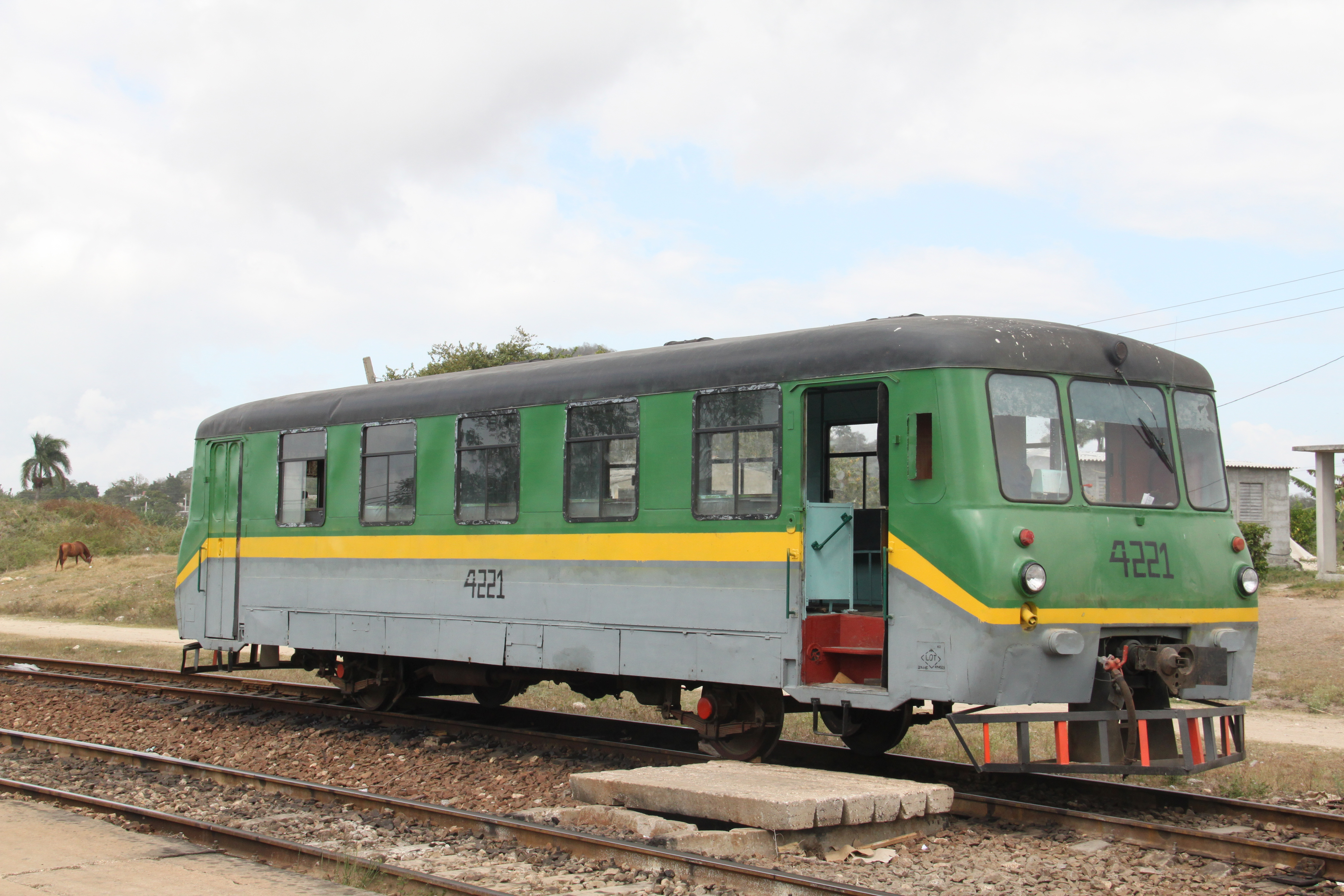
Ex-DB VT 2.09 railcar at Sigüaney
