= Vía Monumental =

Road in Havana, Cuba

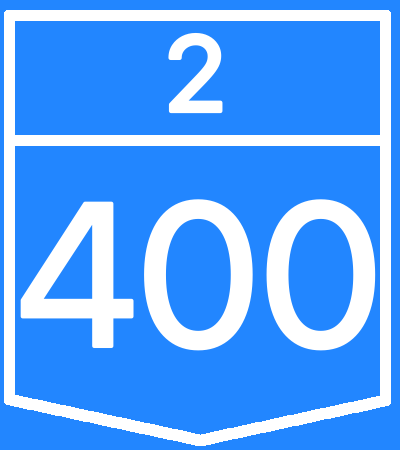
Vía Monumental
- Monumental Road
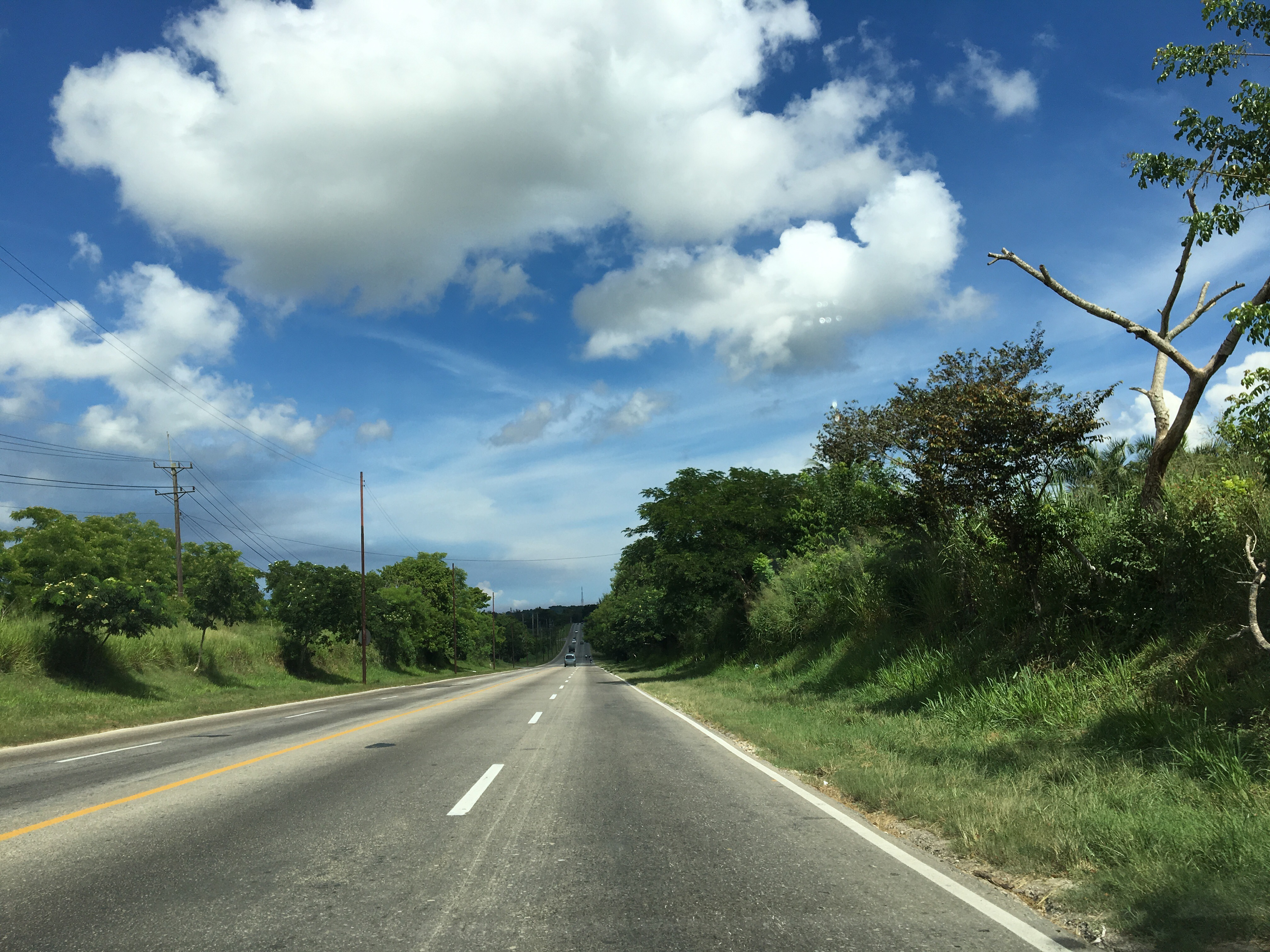
- Vía Monumental in Guanabacoa

Major junctions
- North end: Havana Tunnel
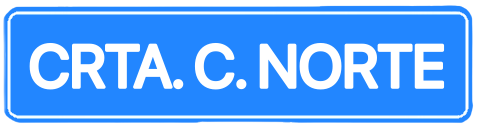
- (I-3) Vía Blanca / CN; A2; A1
- South end: CC / Calle 100

Location
- Country: Cuba

Highway system
- Roads in Cuba

The Vía Monumental (2-400) is a six-lane expressway, with three lanes on each side. It connects the Malecón with Habana del Este in Havana, Cuba.

== History ==
The Vía Monumental, at the time known as the Avenida Monumental (Monumental Avenue), was officially known as Highway 2–19, around the 1960s.

== Characteristics ==
It has six lanes, with 3-metre-wide (9.8 ft) lanes, and a central divider. The speed limit on most sections is 70 kilometres per hour (43 mph).

== Construction ==
During the 1950s, the towns in eastern Havana weren't connected to the main city. There was no adequate road to pass near there. The Vía Blanca had just been built, which connected Havana and the tourist center of Varadero with Matanzas, Guanabacoa, Regla, Diez de Octubre, Marianao and San Miguel del Padrón. One of the first ideas to build a road was to cross the Bay of Havana. Two proposals were made: a bridge and a tunnel. For the bridge it was a problem, because if a hurricane occurred the bridge would likely collapse. Then a tunnel, instead, would be a better option, 12 meters below sea level, allowing any ship to cross the entrance channel. Since 1954, construction of this road began, which passed through Casablanca, the Reparto Camilo Cienfuegos, the Villa Panamericana, Cojímar and Berroa.

== Route ==
Vía Monumental
Exit	km	Municipio	Notes
Havana Tunnel	0	Old Havana, Habana del Este	Part of Circuito Norte
Road of Morro		Habana del Este	Part of Circuito Norte
Road of Astilo		Habana del Este	Part of Circuito Norte
Naval Roundabout		Habana del Este	Part of Circuito Norte
Baragua Roundabout		Habana del Este	Part of Circuito Norte
Avenida Vía Túnel		Habana del Este	Part of Circuito Norte
Rotonda de Alamar		Habana del Este	Part of Circuito Norte
2–I–3 (Circuito Norte / Vía Blanca)		Habana del Este	Part of Circuito Norte
Zona Industrial Berroa		Habana del Este	
2–131 (Independencia Este)		Guanabacoa	
A2		Guanabacoa	
2–191 (Road to Peñalver) (no exit, enter only)		Guanabacoa	
A1		Guanabacoa, Cotorro, San José de las Lajas	
2–241 (Road of Alberro)		Cotorro, San Jose de las Lajas	
2–N–1 (Carretera Central / Calle 101) / 2–400 (Calle 100)		Cotorro	

This road has 7 1/2 kilometres (4.7 mi) bordering the entire east of Havana, where it is part of the Circuito Norte from the tunnel to the intersection with Vía Blanca, in Berroa.
