= Autopista A2 (Cuba) =

Motorway in Cuba

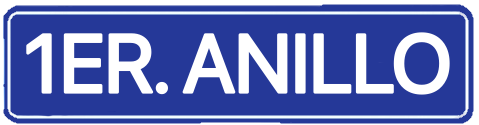
Autopista A2
- Primer Anillo de La Habana
- First Ring of Havana
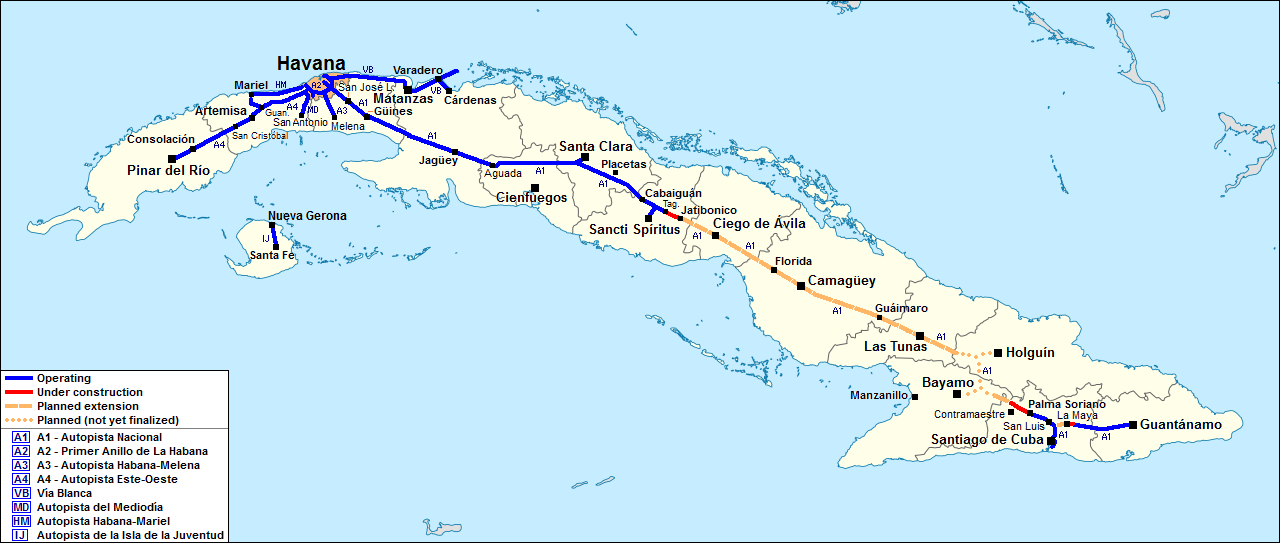
- Map of the Cuban motorway network

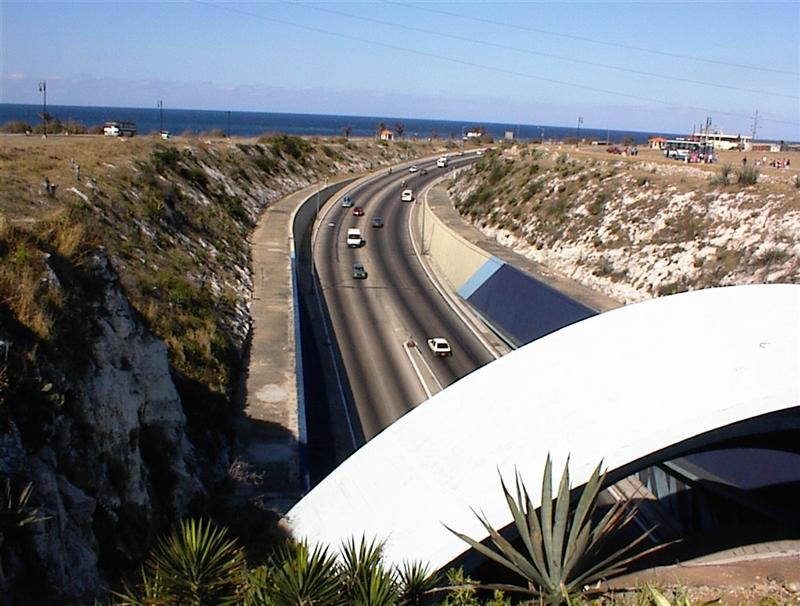
- Western entrance to the Havana Tunnel

Route information
- Length: 36 km (22 mi)

Major junctions
- West end: Calle 114
- A4; Autopista Aeropuerto; Avenida Rancho Boyeros; 2–400; Calzada de Managua; A3; 2–N–1; A1; 2–400; 2–I–3
- East end: Havana Tunnel

Location
- Country: Cuba
- Major cities: Havana

Highway system
- Roads in Cuba

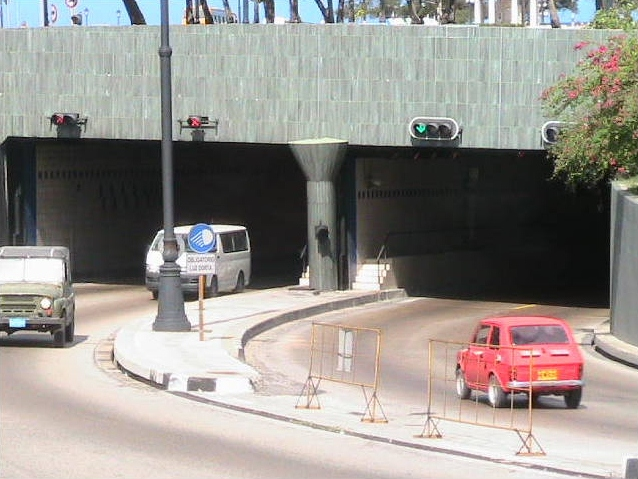
Eastern entrance to the Havana Tunnel, under the Malecón and the San Salvador de la Punta Fortress

The Autopista A2, also known as Primer Anillo de La Habana (First Ring of Havana), is a Cuban motorway serving the city of Havana, that connects almost all of the Cuban motorways to each other. It is a toll-free road and has a length of 36 km (22 mi).

== Route ==
The A2 is a dual carriageway with 6 lanes and has a spur route (Autopista Aeropuerto) to the International Airport of Havana. It connects A1 and A4, the longest autopistas of Cuba, both classified as Autopista Nacional. The northeastern section of A2, from the intersection with the Vía Blanca to the Tunnel, is part of the state highway "Circuito Norte" (CN).

AUTOPISTA A2 (Primer Anillo de La Habana)
Exit	↓km↓	Province	Note
Marianao-Calle 114 (road to Havana city center and Havana–Mariel motorway)	0.0	Havana	
Havana-Pinar del Río (to the Autopista del Mediodía)	0.6	Havana	
CUJAE	1.5	Havana	
Aeropuerto José Martí ( 6-km beltway to the International Airport of Havana)	2.3	Havana	
Boyeros-Av. Independencia (to the International Airport of Havana)	4.0	Havana	
Habana Golf Club	4.6	Havana	
Av. Varona	6.0	Havana	
Calle 100-Fortuna	7.4	Havana	
Calabazar	8.5	Havana	
ExpoCuba	9.3	Havana	
Calvario-Managua	12.9	Havana	
Havana-Melena del Sur	14.4	Havana	
Cotorro-San Francisco de Paula (Carretera Central)	16.9	Havana	
A–1 (Nacional) – Sta Clara	19.6	Havana	Exit to the A–1 westbound is unsigned
Peñalver	22.3	Havana	
Monumental	24.5	Havana	
Guanabacoa	25.7	Havana	
Berroa	27.5	Havana	
(I-3) Vía Blanca	28.2	Havana	CN route
Cojímar	29.7	Havana	CN route
Guiteras-Villa Panamericana	30.8	Havana	CN route
Estadio Panamericano	31.8	Havana	CN route
Habana del Este (Hospital Naval - Camilo Cienfuegos)	33.0	Havana	CN route
Morro-Cabaña	35.1	Havana	CN route
Túnel de La Habana	35.8	Havana	CN route
Habana Vieja (Malecón - Bahía - San Salvador de la Punta)	36.4	Havana	CN route
A2 – Havana Airport Spur (Autopista Aeropuerto)
Exit	↓km↓	Province	Note
Primer Anillo (main route)	0.0	Havana	
Wajay	4.9	Havana	
Aeropuerto José Martí	6.1	Havana	

== See also ==
- Roads in Cuba
- Transportation in Cuba
- Infrastructure of Cuba
