= Alamar =

District of La Habana, Cuba

Coordinates: 23°9′50.53″N 82°17′8.66″W

Alamar, also known as Alamar-Playa, is a district in east part of the city of La Habana in Cuba, part of the municipio of Habana del Este. This district is primarily prefabrication construction of Soviet-style architecture. Because of this, Cuban poet Juan Carlos Flores has described it as "The Heart of The Russian Barrio". The president of the ward is Margarita Basilia Araujo Suárez.

== Geography ==
The ward (consejo popular) is located by the Atlantic coast and is surrounded by the wards of Alamar Este, Alturas de Alamar, Cojímar and Guiteras.

== Hip-hop scene ==
Alamar is one of many barrios (housing projects) in Cuba that is home to a growing Hip-Hop scene. Located at the periphery of Havana, Alamar was identified with Cuba's Hip-Hop movement on a large scale when it hosted the first annual rap festival in 1995. Often referred to as the "home of Cuban rap," Alamar is a Hip-Hop hot spot known especially for its frequent peñas, or multiple performer venues, which are even more commonplace during the rap festival each year. According to Reebee Garofalo and Deborah Pacini Hernandez, authors of The Emergence of Rap Cubano: An Historical Perspective, "the Alamar festival has also stimulated rap festivals and concerts in other parts of Havana, typically in local cultural centres. East Havana, however, has remained rap's stronghold, and the Alamar rap festival is still the most important."

== Farming ==
Alamar is also home to the Organoponico Vivero Alamar, a UBPC co-operative producing organically grown vegetables and medicinal plants. Originally created during the "Special Period" after the collapse of the Soviet Union, the farm has grown to 10.4 hectares, and employs many—in particular senior citizens—from the local community.

The co-operative frequently hosts international visitors and is the subject of the documentary film Tierralismo, directed by Alejandro Ramirez Anderson.
