= Road signs in Cuba =

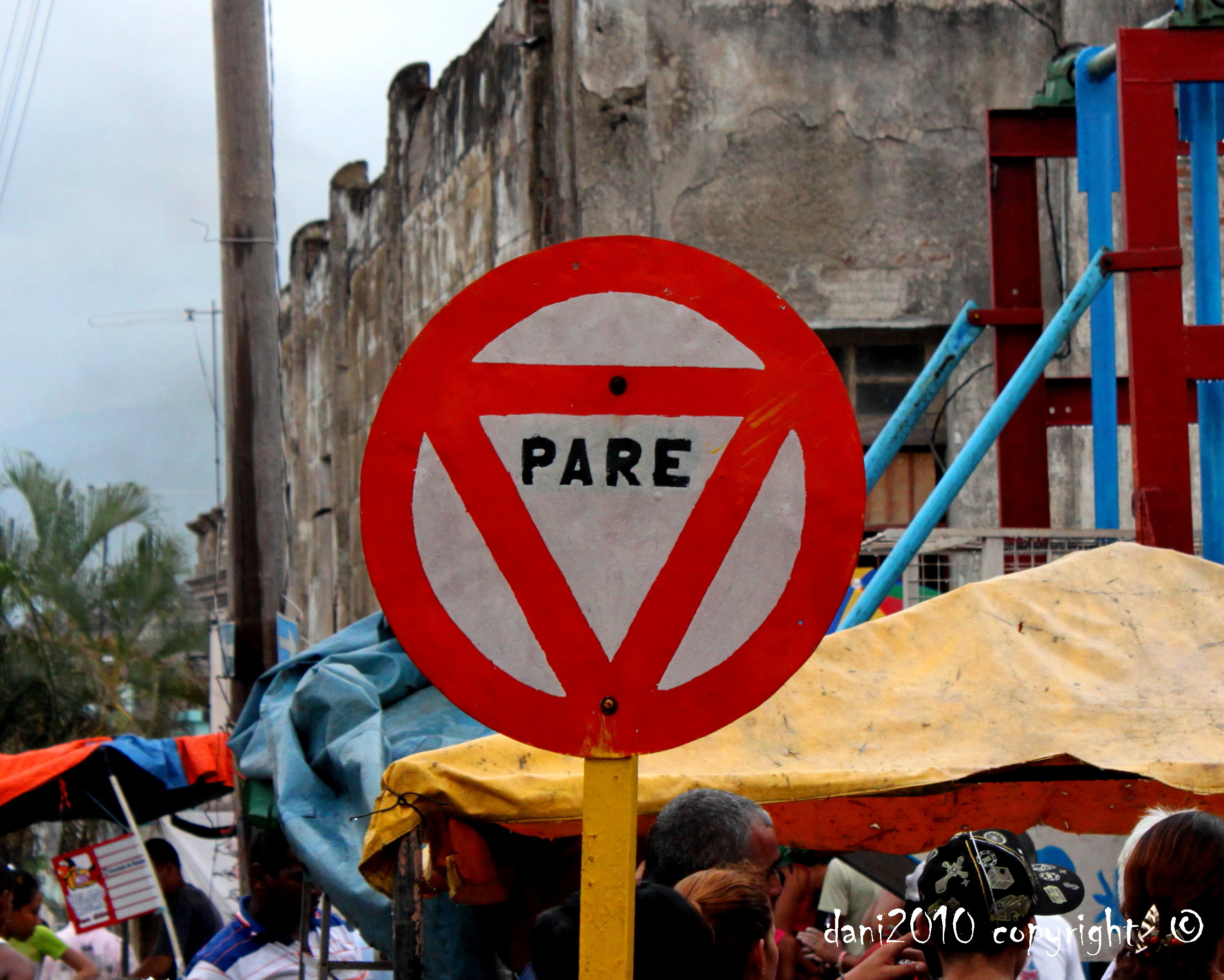
Stop sign used in Cuba

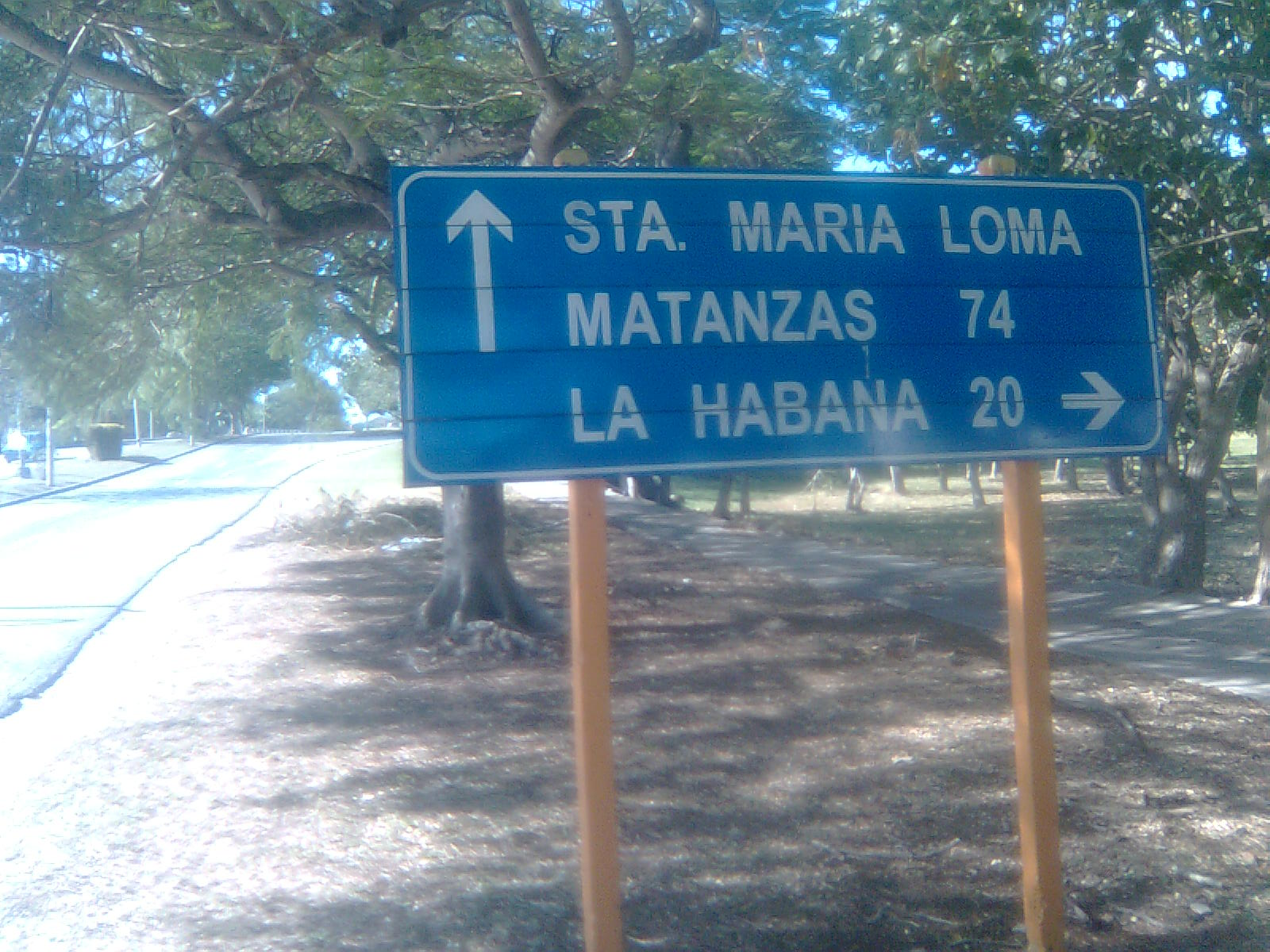
Directional sign in Havana

Road signs in Cuba are regulated in Ley No. 109 Código de Seguridad Vial and generally conform to the 1968 Vienna Convention on Road Signs and Signals.

Road signs in Cuba generally use the same pattern of colours, shapes, and symbols as set out in the Vienna Convention on Road Signs and Signals, which are used in most European countries. Cuba is the only signatory to the Vienna Convention on Road Signs and Signals among the countries of the Caribbean. Cuba drives on the right.

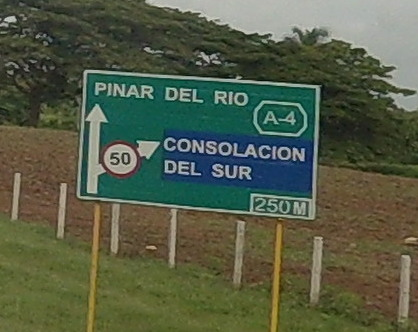
Sign showing the exit on the A4 motorway to State Highway 1–252 to Consolación del Sur, using green and blue showing the motorway and state highway

Highway signs in Cuba generally use green for the four main motorways (the A1, A2, A3, A4, and their spur routes), and blue for state highways and motorways outside the major 4 (the I–3 and the Carretera Panamericana).

== Warning signs (Group A) ==
Unlike most countries in the Americas (United States, Canada, and Latin American countries) that use diamond-shaped warning signs on a yellow background based on the MUTCD, warning signs in Cuba are triangular in shape with a red border, and a yellow background, similar to those used in Poland, Sweden, Vietnam, and Finland.

Intersection with priority

Intersection with priority

Intersection with priority

Intersection with priority

Intersection with priority

Intersection

Traffic lights

Roundabout

Level crossing ahead (with gates)

Level crossing ahead (without gates)

Low-flying aircraft

Uneven road

Speed bump

Dip

Curve to the right

Curve to the left

Double curve, or a series of curves, the first to the right

Double curve, or a series of curves, the first to the left

Steep descent

Steep ascent

Crosswind

Pedestrian crossing (zebra stripe variant)

Pedestrian crossing (parallel line variant)

Children

Animals (domesticated)

Animals (wild)

Two-way traffic

Falling rocks

Falling rocks

Loose gravel

Cyclists

Danger

Countdown marker (150 metres)

Countdown marker (100 metres)

Countdown marker (50 metres)

Stop ahead

Give way ahead

== Priority signs (Group B) ==
Unlike most countries in the world that use an octagonal stop sign, Cuba still uses a circular stop sign with a red inverted triangle defined in the Vienna Convention on Road Signs and Signals as B2b. This convention allowed an older style of stop sign until 2026.

Stop sign

Give way

Priority for oncoming traffic

Priority over oncoming traffic

Priority road

End of priority road

Turn right on red light

Go straight on red light

Turn left on green light

== Prohibitory signs (Group C) ==
No vehicles

No entry

No entry for any motorised vehicle (except motorcycles without sidecars)

No entry for motorcycles

No entry for goods vehicles whose laden weight exceeds 10 tonnes

No entry for motorised vehicles

No entry for bicycles

No entry for animal-drawn vehicles

No horse riding

No entry for handcarts

No entry for pedestrians

No entry for vehicles having a mass exceeding 2 tonnes on one axle

No entry for goods vehicles or combinations of vehicles exceeding 10 metres in length

No entry for vehicles whose overall width exceeds 2 metres

No entry for vehicles whose overall height exceeds 3.5 metres

No entry for any motorised vehicle drawing a trailer (except semi-trailers or single-axle trailers)

No entry for motorised agricultural vehicles

Driving of vehicles less than 70 metres apart prohibited

Maximum speed limit

No right turn

No left turn

No U-turn

Overtaking prohibited

Overtaking by goods vehicles prohibited

Parking prohibited

Parking prohibited on odd days: the parking prohibition applies only on odd days on the side of the road where the sign is located

Parking prohibited on even days: the parking prohibition applies only on even days on the side of the road where the sign is located

Stopping and parking prohibited

Use of audible warning devices prohibited

Passing without stopping prohibited

== Mandatory signs (Group D) ==
Mandatory signs are on a blue background with white symbols as defined in Type A of the Vienna Convention on Road Signs and Signals, which is used in almost all countries of Europe, Asia (except for Pakistan and Sri Lanka) and Africa, as well as New Zealand.

Go straight ahead

Turn left

Turn right

Turn left ahead

Turn right ahead

Go straight or turn left

Go straight or turn right

Roundabout

Pass on the left

Pass on the right

Cycle path

Footpath

Segregated cycle and pedestrian path

Shared-use path

Horse riding track

Minimum speed limit

Trucks only

Buses only

== De-restriction signs (Group E) ==
End of the maximum speed limit

End of the overtaking prohibition

End of the overtaking prohibition for goods vehicles

End of the minimum speed limit

End of all local prohibitions imposed on motorised vehicles

== Information sign (Group F) ==
One-way traffic

One-way traffic

Parking

Hospital

Motorway

End of motorway

Road for motor vehicles

End of road for motor vehicles

Bus stop

No through road

First aid station

Public telephone

Breakdown service

Filling station

Restaurant

Cafeteria

Hotel or motel

Start of hiking trail

Picnic area

Camping site

Caravan site

Camping and caravan site

Youth hostel

Pedestrian crossing (zebra stripe variant)

Pedestrian crossing (parallel line variant)

Pedestrian overpass

Pedestrian underpass

Parking place for handicapped persons

Rest area

Emergency telephone

Tunnel

End of tunnel

Restricted parking zone

End of restricted parking zone

== Orientation signs (Group G) ==
Start of extra lane with minimum speed limit

End of extra lane

Start of extra lane

Advance direction sign for route to be followed to turn left, where a left turn at the next intersection is prohibited

Supplementary sign indicating the distance to the target in metres

Supplementary sign indicating the length of the danger/restriction in kilometres

Side extension (of parking or stopping restriction)

Side extension (of parking or stopping restriction)

Side extension (of parking or stopping restriction)

Only road user category shown (semi-trailer trucks)

Direction of priority road

Advisory speed limit
