= Calle 100 (Havana) =

Street in Cuba

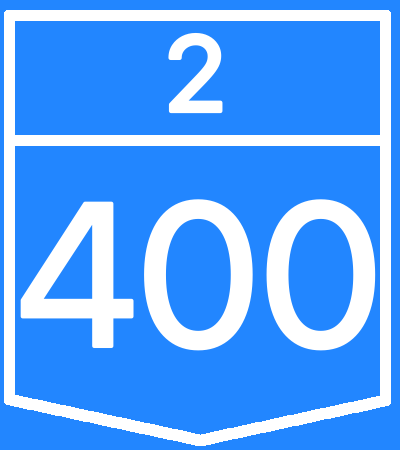
- Avenida San Francisco
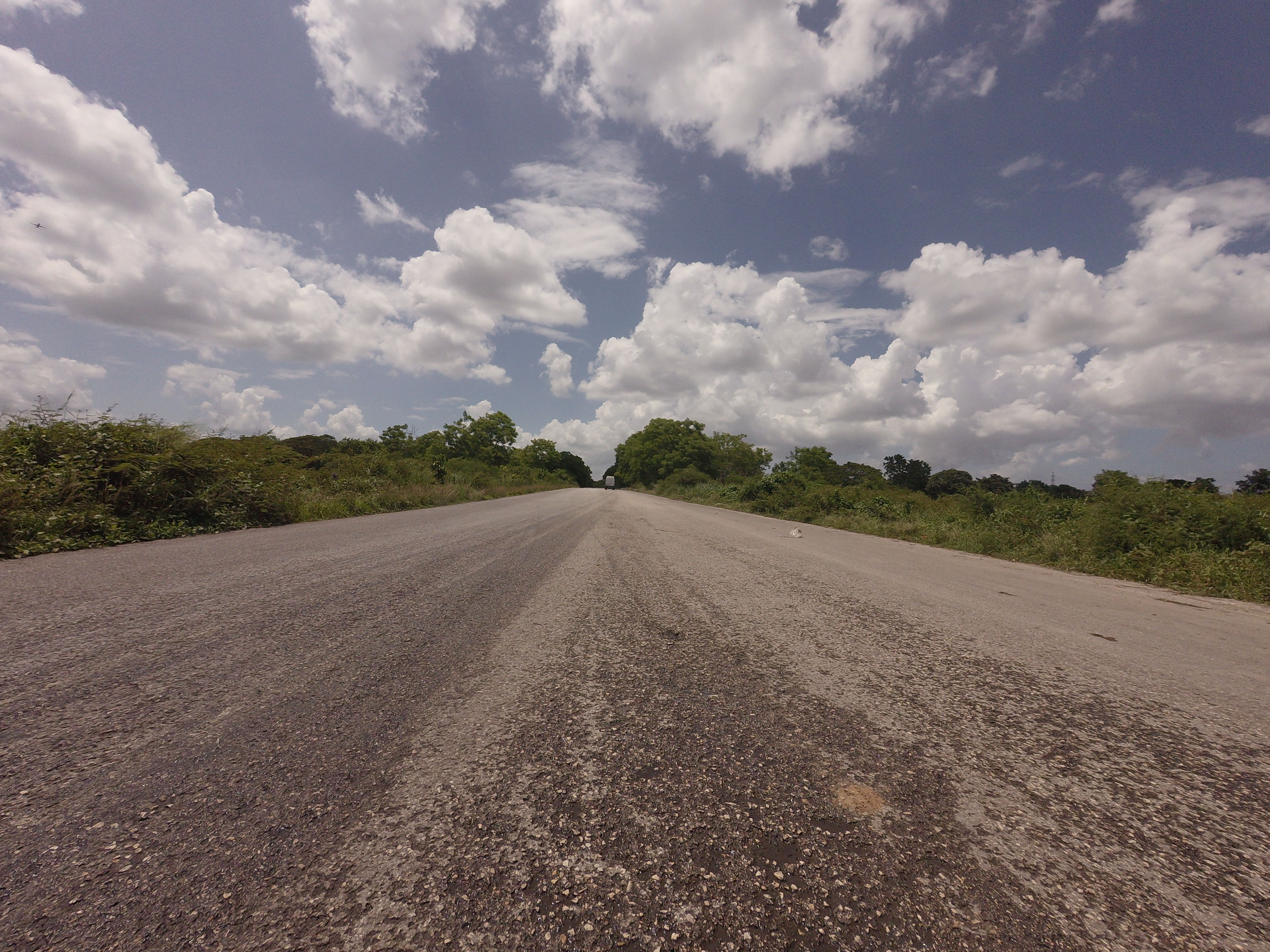
- Calle 100 in Eletrico, Arroyo Naranjo
- East end: CC / continuing 2–400
- Major junctions: A2 (shortley merges with it); Calzada de Bejucal; A2 (splits from each other); Avenida Rancho Boyeros; A4
- West end: Avenida 31 / Ciudad Escolar Libertad

Calle 100 (English: 100th Street) is a street in Havana, Cuba. It starts from the Carretera Central, nearby Cuatro Caminos, to the Ciudad Escolar Libertad in Marianao. The road connects different important avenues and streets together, including the Avenida 51 and Avenida 41. Along with the Vía Monumental, it is part of the highway 400. (also 2–400 since it is part of zone 2 of the Cuban highway system)

== History ==
The Calle 100 was the first road in the area to have a central divider. Throughout its history the road has had several names, with a section being named Buen Retiro, after the Buen Retiro district in the area, and later from the Avenida 31 to the Calzada de Marianao it was named the Avenida de Columbia, and from Altahabana to the end of the road with the Carretera Central, it was called the Doble vía or Calzada of San Francisco, now being named Avenida San Francisco.

In 2022, at the junction with Avenida Rancho Boyeros, the Havana police arrested 30 people for illegally reselling basic necessities, by buying them at the store for ~90 CUP (depending on the product) and reselling for 1,500-2,000 CUP. This included freezes packed with chicken meat and over 400 egg cartons. This type of activity is known to be common on this junction, with the police doing a surprise operation very early in the morning.

== Calle 100 landfill ==
The Calle 100 has a landfill located nearby, named the Basurero de la Calle 100 or Calle 100 Landfill. It is the largest garbage dump in Havana and is known as a challenges that makes it hard for better environmental hygiene in the city, with it having toxic smoke coming out affecting over 250,000 residents in Havana, and causing pollution throughout the city. The dump also has people living there, which eat the trash that is located there. There is also illegal dumpings for trucks that aren't allowed to dump there, which usually come at around dawn.

== Route ==
In Marianao, the road starts at the Carlos J. Finlay Memorial Obelisk, on the roundabout with Avenida 31. The road starts being full with trees and having a central divider, with it later going to become a green overgrowth with less houses after it leaves the Autopista A2.

== Junction list ==
Municipality	Location	km	mi	Destination	Notes
Cotorro		0	0	CC (Calle 101) / 2–400	Continues as the Vía Monumental (2–400)
Cotorro				Road to Palo Jorobado	
Cotorro				Calle 52 – Santa Ana	
Cotorro	Hatuey			Calle 38	
Cotorro				Calle 20 – Cotorro	
Arroyo Naranjo				A3 flyover	No Entrance / No Exit
Arroyo Naranjo				2–600	
Arroyo Naranjo				Road of Expocuba – ExpoCuba, Managua	Road gains a central divider
Arroyo Naranjo				Carretera del Parque Lenin – A Lenin, A Celia	
Arroyo Naranjo				Primer Anillo (A2) – Nacional, Santa Clara, Cienfuegos	concurrency with the A2;A2 unsigned
Arroyo Naranjo	Llansó			Calzada de Bejucal	
Arroyo Naranjo				A2 / Calzada de Arday – El Trigal	leaves the A2
Arroyo Naranjo	Fortuna			Calle Arday	
Arroyo Naranjo	Aldabó			Calle Aldabó	
Arroyo Naranjo	Altahabana			Calle Perla	
Arroyo Naranjo	Altahabana			Calle 10	
Arroyo Naranjo	Altahabana			Calzada de Vento	
Arroyo Naranjo	Altahabana			Avenida Rancho Boyeros – Ciudad Deportiva, Plaza de la Revolución	
Marianao	Puente Nuevo			A4 – Pinar del Río, José Martí International Airport	
Marianao	Marianao			Avenida 51 / Avenida 41 / Avenida 45	
Marianao	Marianao			Avenida 31	
Marianao	Marianao			Ciudad Escolar Libertad	
