= Tarará =

- resort town
- Location of Tarara in Cuba
- Coordinates: 23°10′37″N 82°12′14″W
- Country: Cuba
- Province: Ciudad de La Habana
- Municipality: Habana del Este

Tarará is a gated resort town in the municipality of Habana del Este in the city of Havana, Cuba. It is about 19 km east of the city centre and west of other beaches including Santa Maria del Mar and Guanabo.

== Geography ==
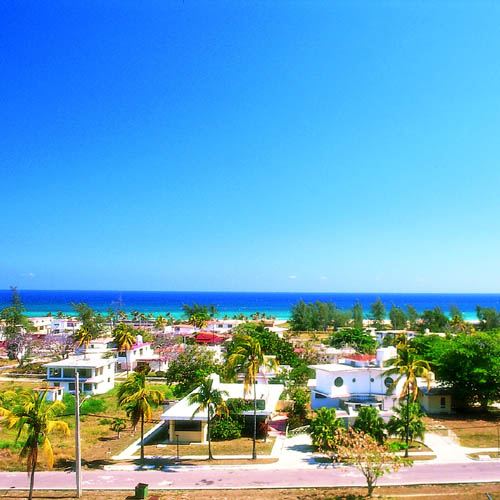
Playa Tarará

This resort community was built in the 1940s in Art Deco style on a hill facing the Atlantic Ocean. A small marina is located in an inlet west of the town. An amusement park was located across from this inlet, but now (2006) lies in ruins. While there's hardly any evidence of its past existence on the ground, the aerial view reveals a pentagram shape. The Pentagram does not belong to Playa Tarara, but to Playa Celimar. It was built after 1959 as an amusement park for "Pioneros of Cuba" organization.

== History ==
Royal Sylvester Webster was an American Chief Engineer who oversaw the building of the railroads in Mexico. He later moved to Cuba where he continued to oversee the building of the railroads and, having loved the country, decided to make it his permanent home. While living in Cuba, he met Helen Walsh, who was vacationing there. They married and had six children. Mr. Webster bought the land for Tarará. The name, Tarará, was taken from the refrain of a song the Chinese workers used to sing during the days that Mr. Webster worked at the railroads. Tarará was developed in the 1940s by Mr. Webster as a complete town, with a church, Santa Elena (after his wife), a club known as the Tarará Yacht Club, 400 residences, stores, a movie theater, a marina, a public park and beach facilities. Many considered the Tarará beach to be one of the most beautiful on the island, with its boardwalk being a popular weekend destination. Tarará was a fast and easy trip to Havana and the airport, with newly paved highways going directly to the resort. Mr. Webster lived there, as did all of his children. Helen Walsh died in 1940 and Royal Sylvester Webster died in 1956. All six of his children, born in Cuba, lived there until they were later forced to leave the island, when Castro's police confiscated their homes.

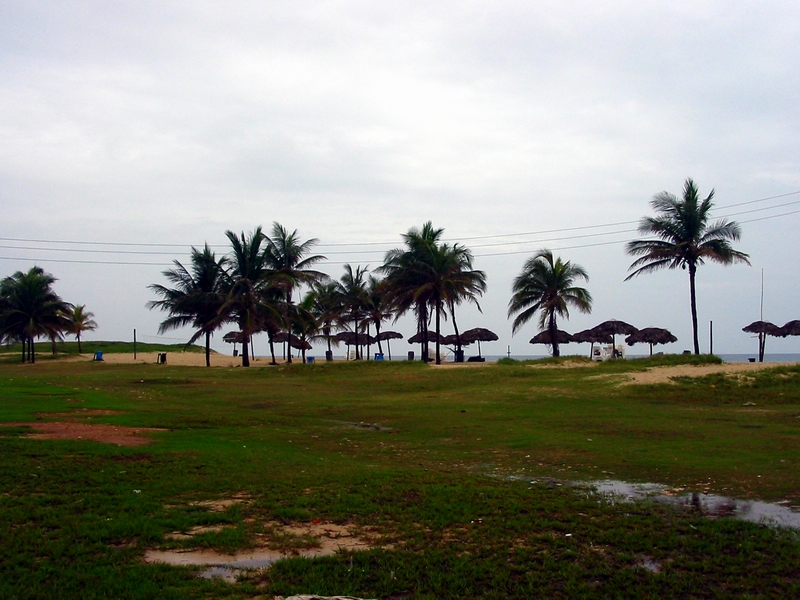
Beach in Tarara

After the Cuban Revolution, in January 1959, Che Guevara went to live at a summer villa in Tarará to recover from a violent asthma attack. While there he started the Tarará Group, a group that debated and formed the new plans for Cuba's social, political, and economic development. In addition, Che began to write his book Guerrilla Warfare while resting at Tarará. Che returned to Tarará in June 1959 for his honeymoon after his marriage to his second wife Aleida March.

At the height of tight Cuban-Soviet relations, the town housed Russian officials stationed in Cuba, and for a while (early 1990s) functioned as a recovery resort for Ukrainian children affected by the Chernobyl nuclear disaster. After 2000 (and the partial opening of Cuba to foreign investments), this was a place of choice for representatives of foreign companies that were doing business in Cuba, with the residences functioning as rental villas.

In 2007, the town began to receive Chinese students, especially high school graduates. This is under a project in which the Cuban government provides scholarships and facilities for those Chinese to learn Spanish.

The Tarará beach houses can now be leased for a minimum one year from the government for foreign and embassy employees. In previous years Canadians, Italians and Spanish visitors rented the beach houses for long stay vacations for 1–6 months, but this has not been re-established yet as of 2009. Many houses have been renovated recently again due to interior destruction from the Venezuelan people's misuse. The Cuban doctors now go to Venezuela to treat eye patients.

== Oil discovery ==
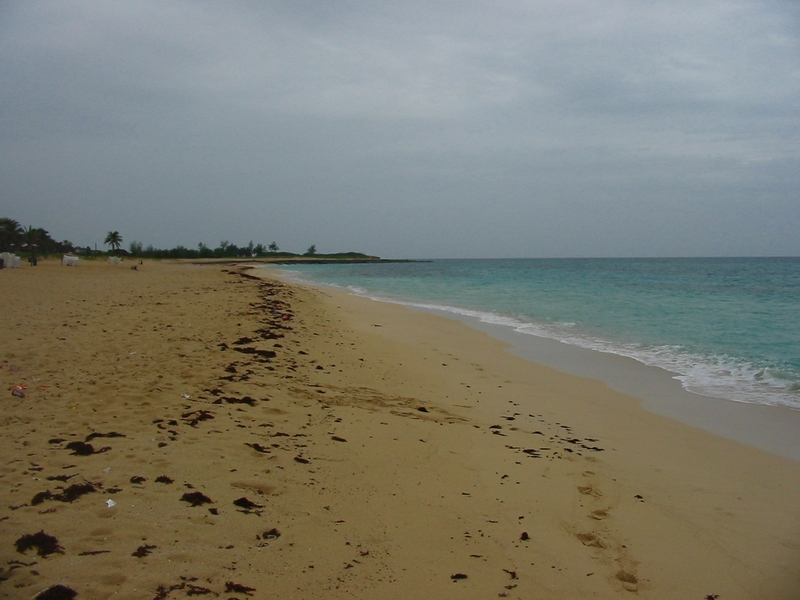
Beach in Tarará

In 2006, oil was discovered in a well near Tarará.

== Sources ==
- Castaneda, Jorge, The Life and Death of Che Guevara: Compañero, New York: Vintage Books (1998) ISBN 0-679-75940-9
