= Iglesia de Santa María del Rosario =

Church in Havana, Cuba

Coordinates: 23.06138°N 82.25765°W

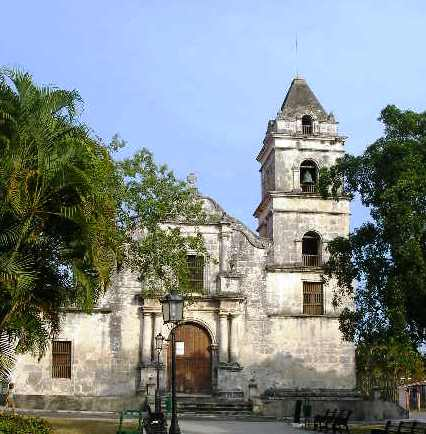
Iglesia Parroquial de Santa María del Rosario

The Iglesia Parroquial de Santa María del Rosario is a church located some 20 km southeast of downtown Havana, Cuba, in the municipality of Cotorro.

== History ==
It was built between 1760 and 1766 and is known by the title given by the Obispo Espada: “The Cathedral of the fields of Cuba”. On two occasions (1946 and 1984), it has been declared a National Monument. It has a baroque altar that still contains its Solomonic column covered in gold.

== Famous visitors ==
The first Cuban scientist graduated in medicine, the Dr. Tomás Romay and Chacón, was baptised in the Iglesia Parroquial de Santa María del Rosario in 1764. The Cuban writer Alejo Carpentier married in this church by the decade of 1940.

José María Chacón and Calvo, famous hispanist and sixth earl of House Bayona was baptised in this church. The church was visited by Queen Sofia of Spain in 1999.
