= Jamaica (disambiguation) =

Jamaica is a nation in the Caribbean Sea.

Jamaica may also refer to:

== Places ==
=== United States ===
- Jamaica, Georgia
- Jamaica, Illinois
- Jamaica, Iowa
- Jamaica, Queens, New York City
  - Jamaica Avenue, a street in Queens, New York City
  - Jamaica Bay
- Jamaica, Vermont, a New England town
  - Jamaica (CDP), Vermont, the central village in the town
- Jamaica, Virginia
- Jamaica Beach, Texas
- Jamaica Plain, Massachusetts

=== Cuba ===
- Jamaica, Cuba, Guantánamo Province
- Jamaica, Mayabeque

=== Mexico ===
- Mercado Jamaica, Mexico City (Jamaica Market)

== People ==
- Jamaica Kincaid, African American author
- Jamaica Rector, former American football player
- Jamaica Osorio, Hawaiian poet and activist

== Arts, entertainment and media ==
- Jamaica (novel), a novel by Malcolm Knox
- Giamaica or "Jamaica", recorded by several Italian artists
- "Jamaica" (song), a song by Bachman–Turner Overdrive
- "D'yer Mak'er", a song by Led Zeppelin - pronounced "Jamaica"
- Jamaica (musical), a musical by Harold Arlen and EY Harburg

== Rail transport ==
- 45612 Jamaica, a British LMS Jubilee Class locomotive
- BMT Jamaica Line, a New York City Subway line
- Jamaica Center–Parsons/Archer station, a New York City Subway station complex at Parsons Boulevard and Archer Avenue serving the J and Z trains and the E train
- Jamaica station, a station on the Long Island Rail Road and AirTrain JFK
- Jamaica–179th Street (IND Queens Boulevard Line), a New York City Subway station at Hillside Avenue and 179th Street serving the E, F, and <F> trains
- Jamaica–Van Wyck (IND Archer Avenue Line), a New York City Subway station at Jamaica Avenue and Van Wyck Expressway serving the E train
- Jamaica metro station, a station in Mexico City
- The Jamaica, a caboose owned by Sir John A. Macdonald

== Ships ==
- HMS Jamaica (C44), a cruiser of the Royal Navy
- SS Jamaica, a United Fruit Company turbo-electric liner that was commissioned into the US Navy as USS Ariel (AF-22)
- USS Jamaica (CVE-43), an escort carrier of the US Navy

== Other uses ==
- Jamaica (drink), a hibiscus tea drink popular in Mexico
- Jamaica coalition (politics), German political term
- Jamaica Station (Royal Navy), a former British naval command (1655-1830)
