= Autopista A3 (Cuba) =

Motorway in Cuba

Autopista A3
- Autopista Havana—Melena
- Havana-Melena Motorway
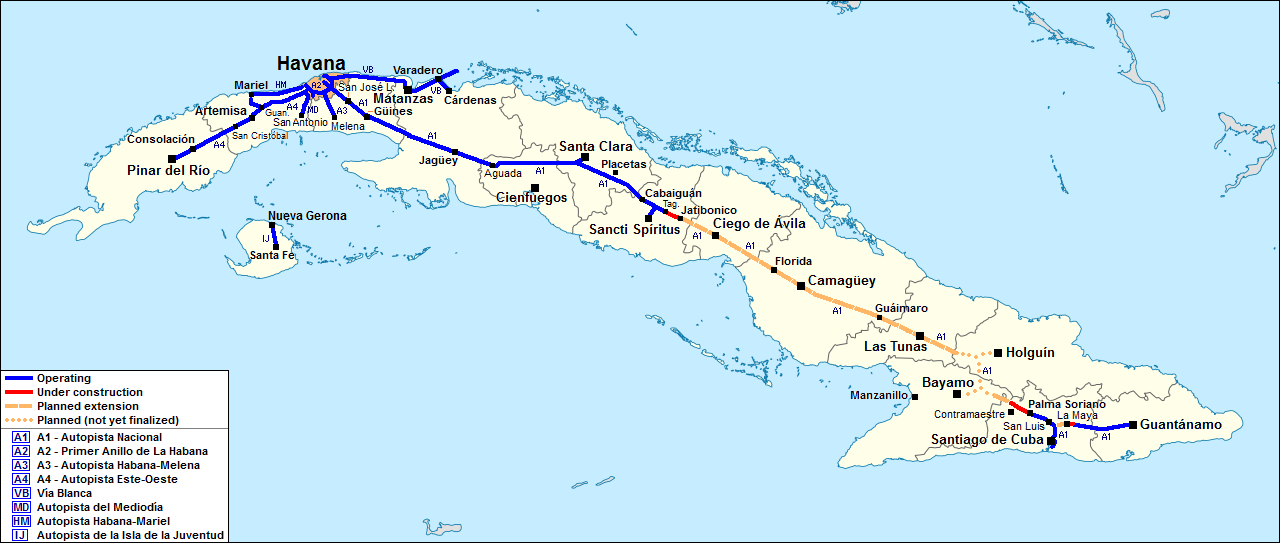
- Map of the Cuban motorway network

Route information
- Length: 32 km (20 mi)

Major junctions
- North end: Autopista A2 (Havana)
- South end: 2–740 (Melena del Sur)

Location
- Country: Cuba
- Major cities: Havana, Melena del Sur

Highway system
- Roads in Cuba

The Autopista A3, also known as Autopista Havana-Melena, is a Cuban motorway linking Havana to Melena del Sur. It is a toll-free road and has a length of 32 km (20 mi). Although it's a part of the Cuban motorway system, it only has one official interchange with the San José de las Lajas-Bejucal Road (2-376), and an unofficial unpaved interchange with the Calle 100 (2-400) of Havana, with the rest of the junctions being at-grade. It also turns into an undivided 2 lane highway after the junction with the Road of Batabano.

== Route ==
The A3 is a dual carriageway with 4 lanes and has some at-grade intersections with rural roads. It starts in Havana, from an interchange of the Havana Beltway (A2), and continues through Mayabeque Province; crossing the western side of the municipality of San José de las Lajas, and ending on a provincial highway, 2 km west of Melena del Sur.

Exit	↓km↓	Province	Note
A2 (Nacional)	0.0	Havana	At-grade intersection
Calle 100 (2-400)		Havana	Unpaved interchange
Las Guásimas	5.8	Havana	At-grade intersection
Managua	10.2	Havana	At-grade intersection
Nazareno (to San José de las Lajas and Bejucal)	16.8	Mayabeque	
San Antonio de las Vegas (to San José de las Lajas and Batabanó)	20.0	Mayabeque	At-grade intersection; End of divided section
La Ruda-San Antonio de las Vegas	26.0	Mayabeque	At-grade intersection
Guara-Marañón	27.7	Mayabeque	At-grade intersection
Melena del Sur	32.5	Mayabeque	At-grade intersection

== See also ==
- Roads in Cuba
- Transport in Cuba
- Infrastructure of Cuba
