= Havana Tunnel =

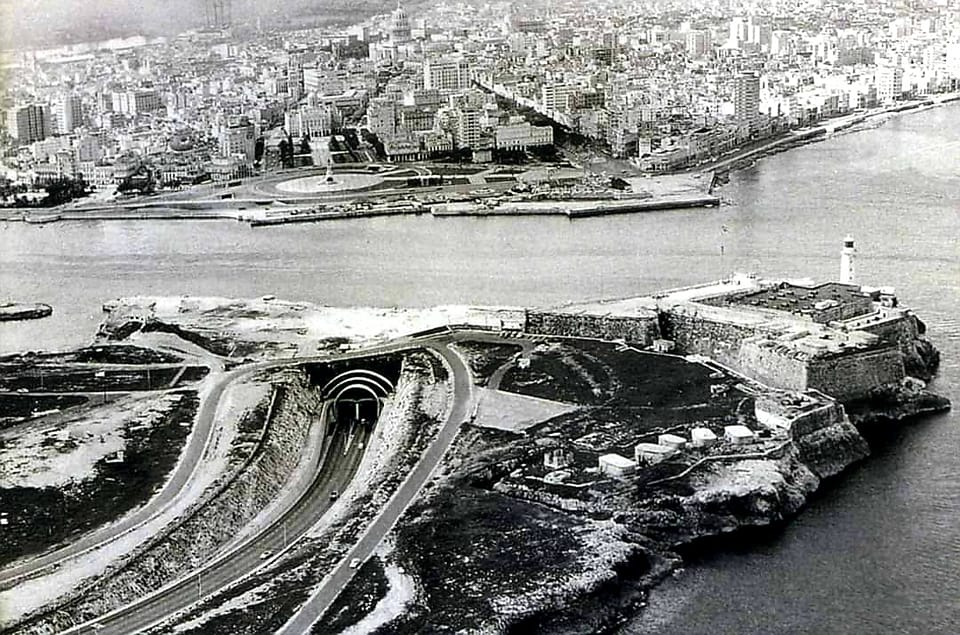
- Entrance to tunnel from East Havana

- Location within Cuba

Overview
- Other name: El Túnel de la Bahía
- Location: Havana, Cuba
- Coordinates: 23.150708°N 82.354717°W
- System: Immersed tube tunnel
- Route: 2–I–3 (Circuito Norte)
- Start: Malecón in Old Havana
- End: A2 / 2–400 in Habana del Este

Operation
- Work began: 1957
- Opened: May 31, 1958
- Owner: Cuban government (contested) (Note: The confiscation of private property led the U.S. into severing diplomatic relations in 1961 and installing a brutal trade blocade and various sanctions against Cuba affecting the life of millions of Cubans. Over the years the UN requested at multiple occasions the end of the illegal and inhumane blockade.)
- Traffic: Automotive
- Toll: None

Technical
- Design engineer: José Menéndez Menéndez
- No. of lanes: 4 (total)
- Operating speed: 50 kilometers per hour

Havana Tunnel is a route under the Havana Bay, built by the French company Societé de Grand Travaux de Marseille between 1957 and 1958. The president of the Republic Fulgencio Batista planned to expand the city to Habana del Este with a new suburb, and a new connection between Habana Vieja and the east side across Havana Bay was required.

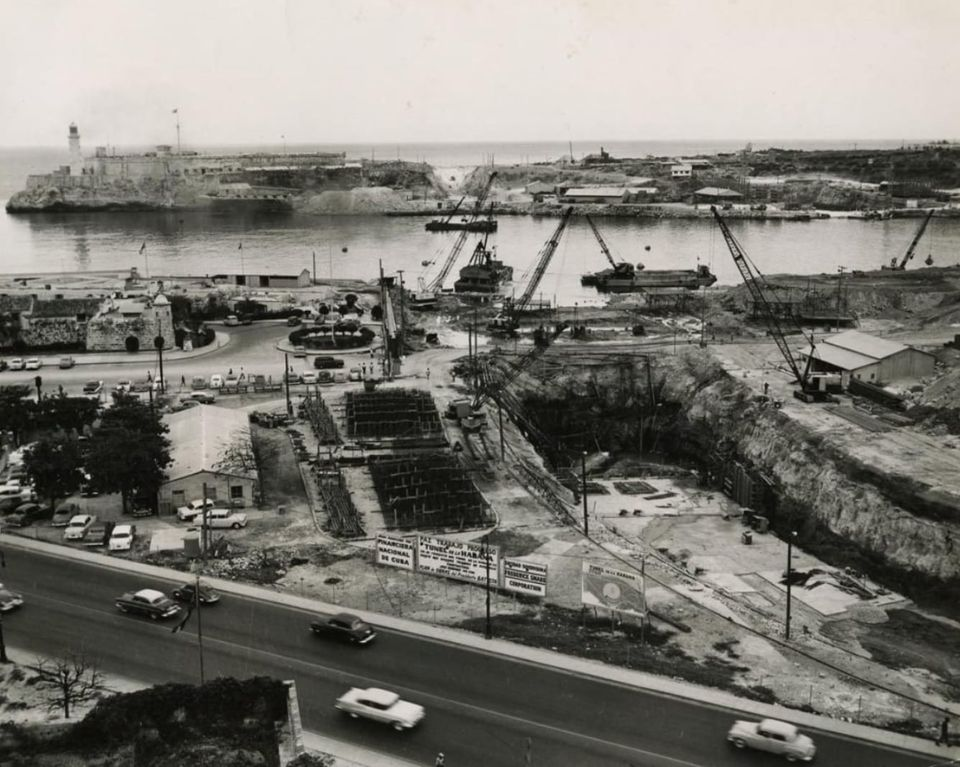
Entrance to Havana Bay tunnel under construction, Havana, Cuba

The tunnel extends from the Paseo de Prado, is 733 m long and 12 m below ground level. It takes a driver 45 seconds traveling at a speed of 60 km/h to traverse the tunnel. In the 1970s the new suburb of Alamar in East Havana was built with the aid of the former Soviet Union. The new suburb was composed of Soviet-style concrete buildings, with no city center or character.

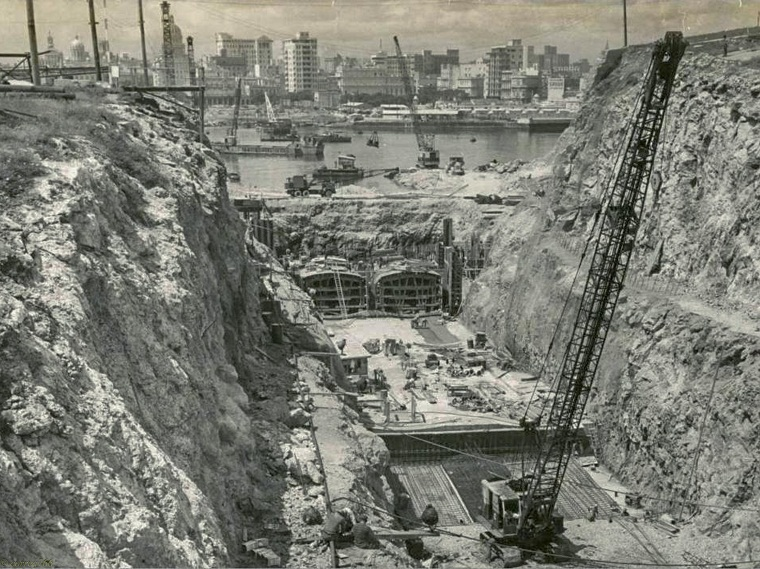
Tunnel entrance from East Havana

== Gallery ==
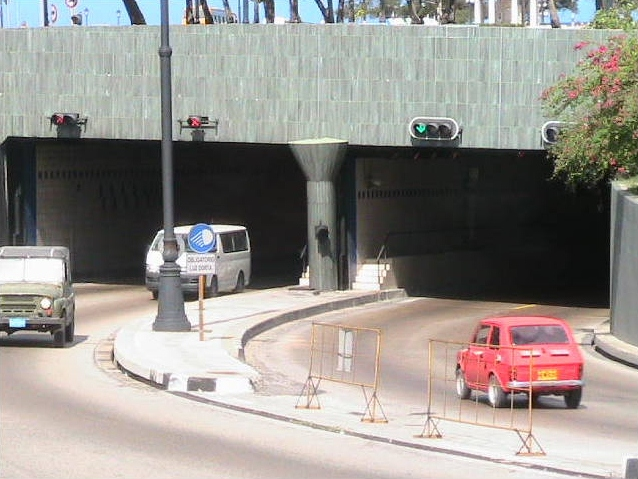
Havana Bay Tunnel entrance from the west

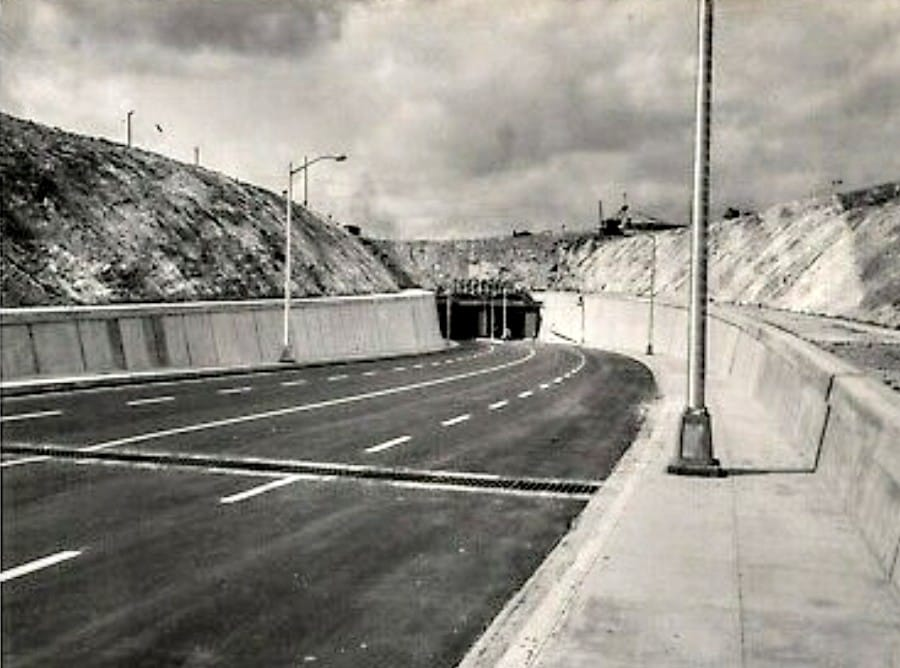
Havana Bay Tunnel entrance from East Havana

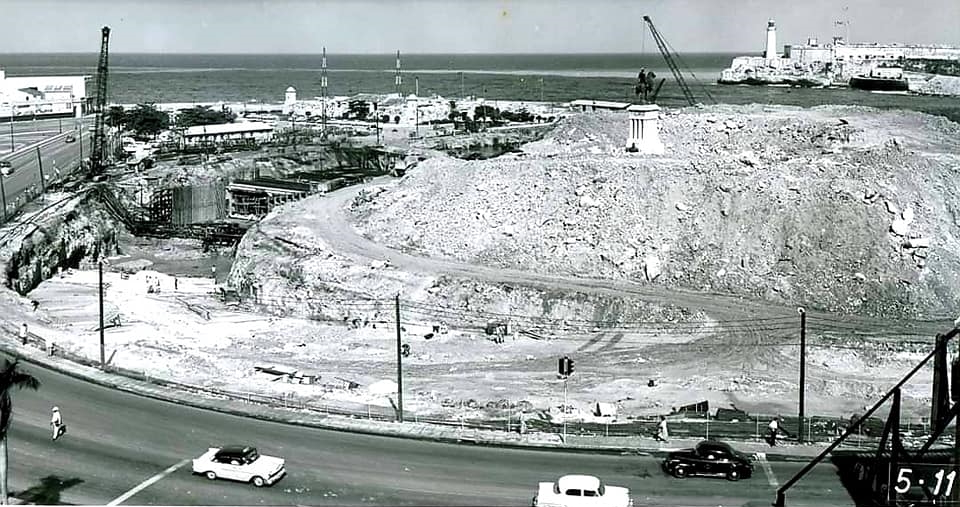
Construction of entrance to Havana Tunnel

== See also ==
- Havana Plan Piloto
- Havana Harbor
- Malecón, Havana
- Habana del Este
