= Vial Autopista–Artemisa =

Road in Cuba

- Motorway–Artemisa Road
- Vial al Autopista (Road to the Motorway)
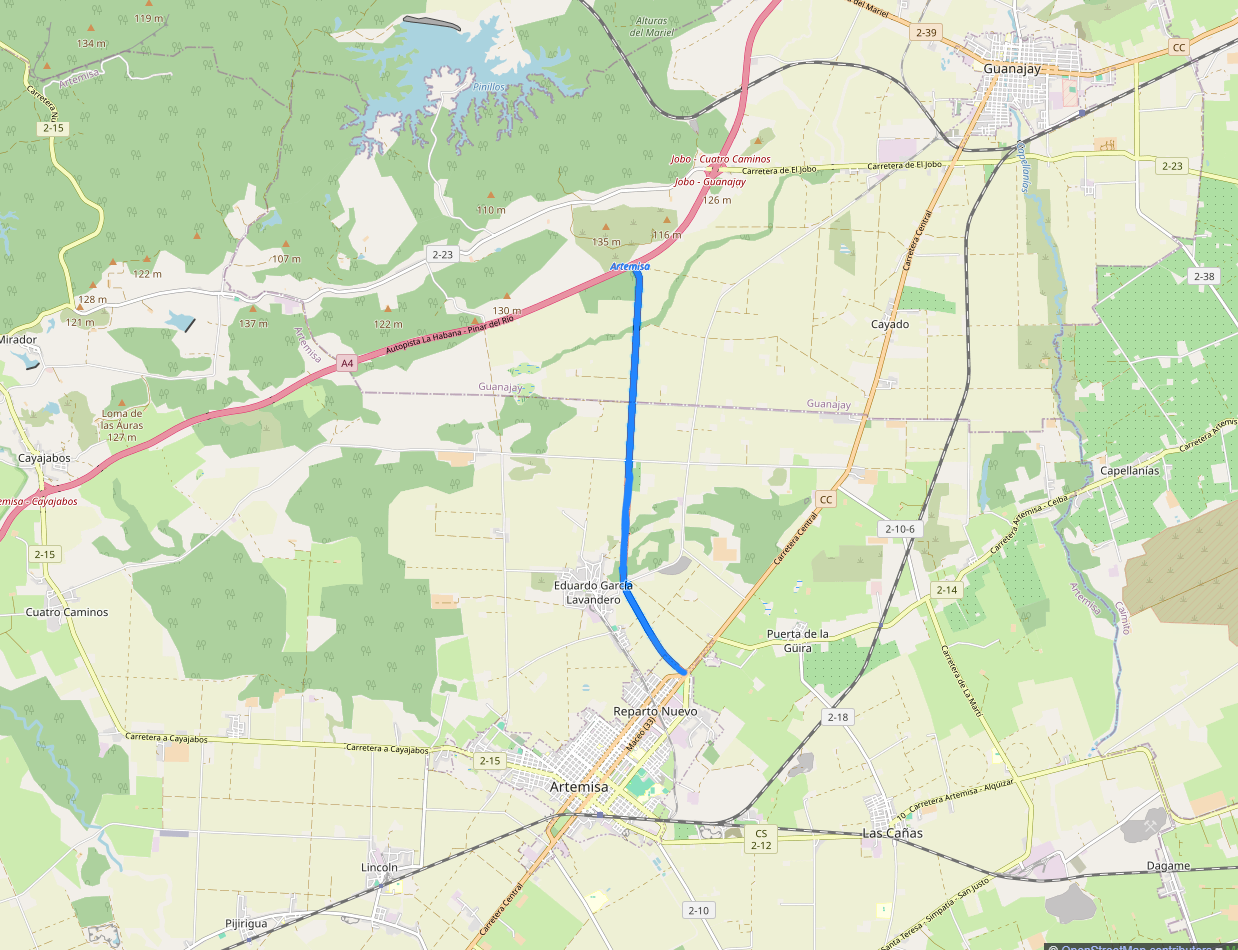
- The Vial Autopista–Artemisa and the Exit "Artemisa" on the A4 seen in blue on an OpenStreetMap map of the region

Route information
- Length: 7.53 km (4.68 mi)
- Existed: 9 January 2022–present

Major junctions
- North end: A4
- South end: 2–N–1 in Artemisa

Location
- Country: Cuba
- Provinces: Artemisa Province
- Municipalities: Guanajay, Artemisa
- Major cities: Artemisa
- Towns: Eduardo García Lavandero

Highway system
- Roads in Cuba

The Vial Autopista–Artemisa (Motorway–Artemisa Road), is a four-lane road connecting the A4 motorway to the city of Artemisa in Cuba. Locally, it is known as the Vial al Autopista (Road to the Motorway).

== History ==
The road project started in 2012 and the construction phase began in 2015. In order to make the road, the Empresa de Vialidad del Gobierno (Government Highway Company) invested 34,000,000 CUP for the project. The road was set to make travel time from Havana to Artemisa less, originally going from the A4 to the Road of El Jobo (Highway 2-23) to the Carretera Central to finally arrive at the city of Artemisa, with the new road being safer due to wider lanes and a median and faster due to a higher speed limit, with the route going from 25 minutes to just 10 minutes.

Later, the road was set to be inaugurated on the 11 year anniversary of Artemisa Province, on 9 January 2022, which was congratulated by Cuban prime minister, Manuel Marrero Cruz.

== Route ==
The road is 4 lanes in total with a median in the middle, with its only paved junctions being with the Autopista A4 and the Carretera Central, and the rest being dirt roads. The road is on Exit "Artemisa" of the A4, which is currently an at-grade junction, but there is a proposal for an interchange.

== Junction list ==
Municipality	Location	km	mi	Destination	Notes
Artemisa	Artemisa	0.00	0.00	2-N-1 (Carretera Central / Calle Cespedes / Calle Maceo) / Avenida 26 de Julio	Roundabout junction with La Pupila Insomne monument; Roundabout known as "Rotonda de La Pupila Insomne; Calle Cespedes is westbound; Calle Maceo is eastbound; Continues as Avenida 26 de Julio
Artemisa		0.47	0.29	Calle 19	Southbound only
Artemisa		1.00	0.62	—	Unnamed farm road
Artemisa		1.29	0.80	Calle 20	
Artemisa	Lavandero	1.92	1.19	Calle 11 / Camino de Dolores	
Artemisa		2.63	1.63	Calle 7	
Artemisa		4.07	2.53	Camino del Destino	
Artemisa		5.08	3.16	Camino del Frontera de Artemisa–Guanajay	
Guanajay		7.53	4.68	A4 (Autopista Nacional / Autopista Este-Oeste) – Havana, Pinar del Río	Exit "Artemisa" on the A4
