= San José de las Lajas Municipal Museum =

Museum in Cuba

- Museo Municipal de San José de las Lajas
- Established: 28 January 1979
- Location: San José de las Lajas, Cuba

San José de las Lajas Municipal Museum is a museum located in the 47th avenue in San José de las Lajas, Cuba. It was established on 28 January 1979.

The museum holds collections on history, weaponry, numismatics and archeology.

== See also ==
- List of museums in Cuba
