= Autopista del Mediodía =

Motorway in Cuba

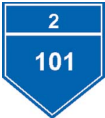
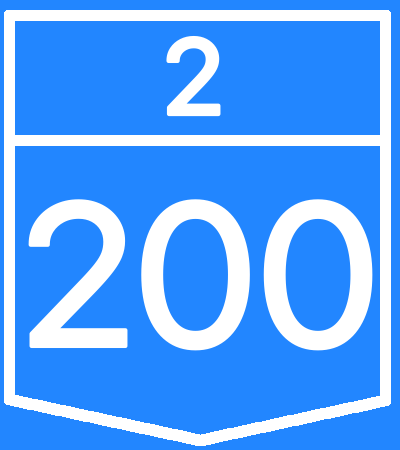
Autopista del Mediodía
- Midday Motorway
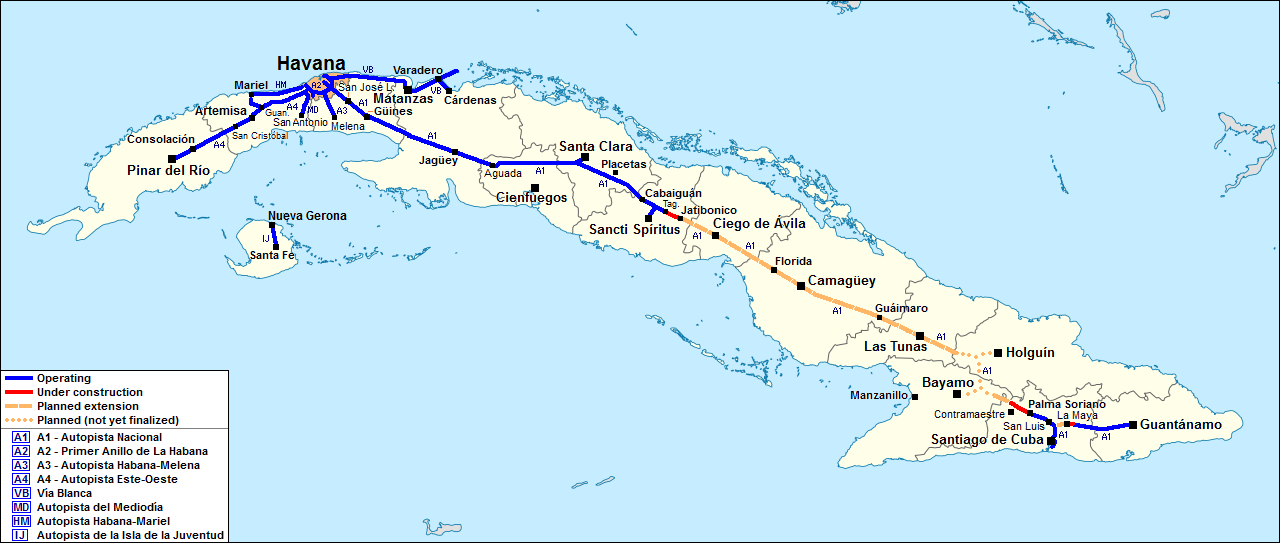
- Map of the Cuban motorway network

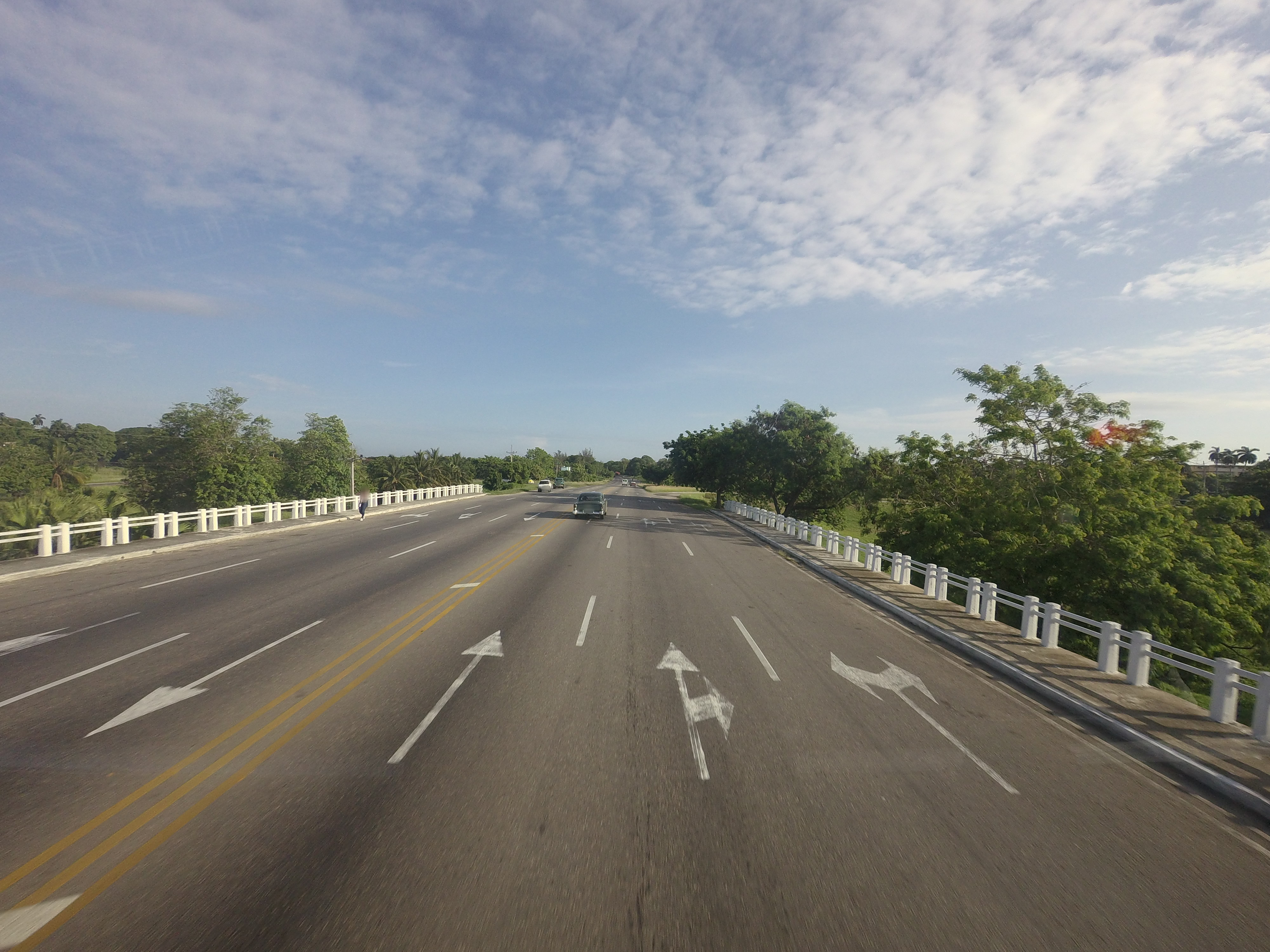
- A bridge of the Mediodía going over the A4

Route information
- Length: 18 km (11 mi)

Major junctions
- North end: Havana
- South end: San Antonio de los Baños

Location
- Country: Cuba
- Major cities: Havana, San Antonio de los Baños

Highway system
- Roads in Cuba

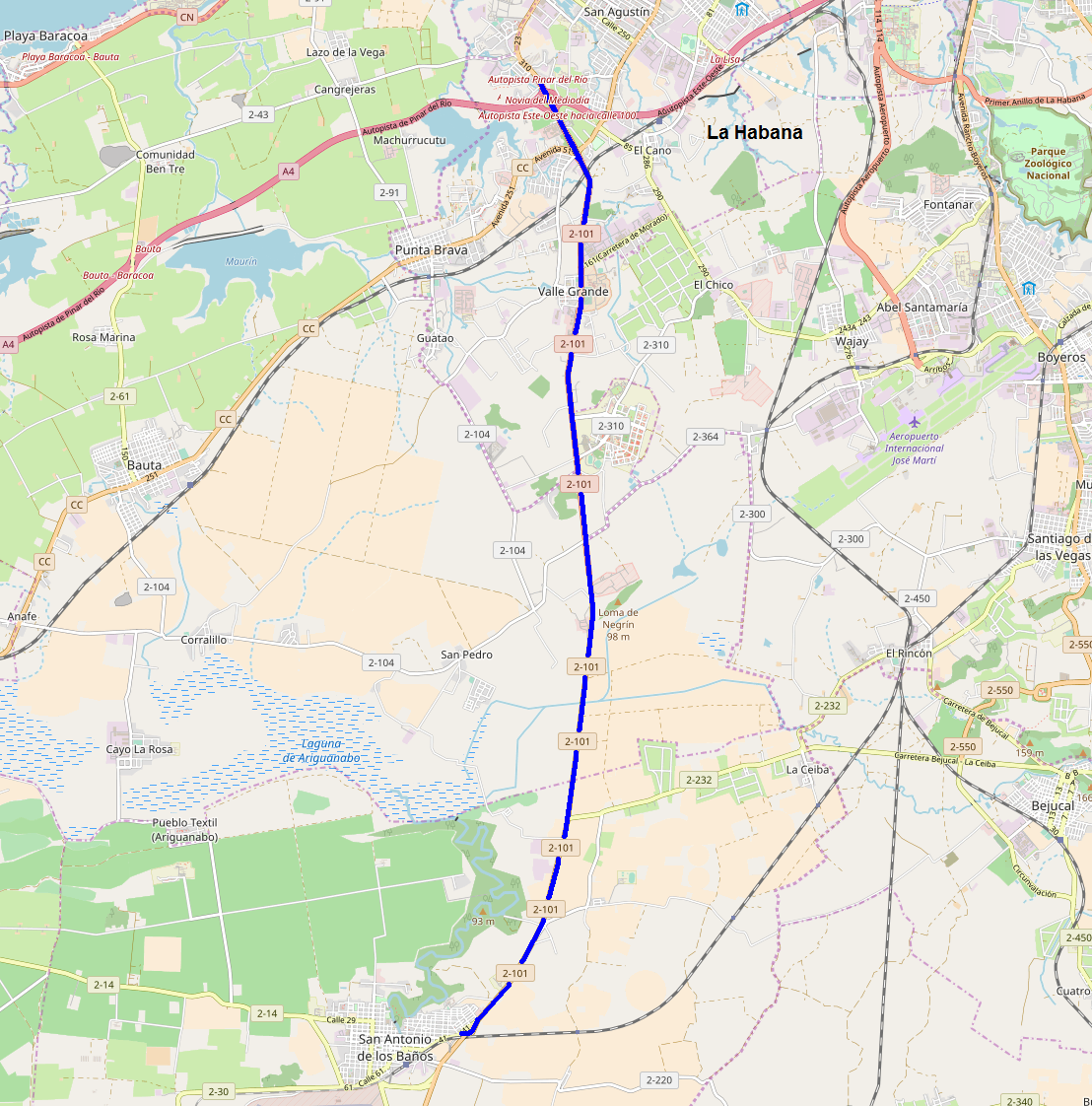
OSM map of the motorway (highlighted in blue) within the suburban area of Havana

The Autopista del Mediodía is a Cuban motorway linking Havana to San Antonio de los Baños. It is a toll-free road and has a length of 18 km (11 mi). The motorway joins the routes of 2–200 coming from the south and 2–101 from the north.

== Route ==
The motorway is a dual carriageway with 4 lanes and has some at-grade intersections with rural roads. It starts in Havana, next to an interchange of the A4 motorway, and continues through Artemisa Province; crossing the eastern side of Bauta municipality, and ending in a fork, east of San Antonio de los Baños. After the fork, the provincial road towards south reaches the nearby San Antonio de los Baños Airfield and the town of Güira de Melena (10 km far).

AUTOPISTA DEL MEDIODÍA
Exit	↓km↓	Province	Note
Habana San Agustín-Avenida 23 (road to Havana city center and Havana–Mariel Motorway)	0.0	Havana	
Havana-Pinar del Río (link to other motorways)	0.4	Havana	
Habana El Cano-Punta Brava (Carretera Central)	1.5	Havana	
Habana Valle Grande	4.3	Havana	
Habana UCI	6.5	Havana	
Bauta-Wajay (to Caimito and José Martí Airport)	8.5	Artemisa; Havana	
Bejucal-La Ceiba (to Santiago de las Vegas	13.5	Artemisa	
La Encrucijada	15.5	Artemisa	
San Antonio de los Baños-Las Yagrumas	17.1	Artemisa	
San Antonio de los Baños	18.0	Artemisa	

== See also ==
- Roads in Cuba
- Transport in Cuba
- Infrastructure of Cuba
