= San José de las Lajas =

- Municipality
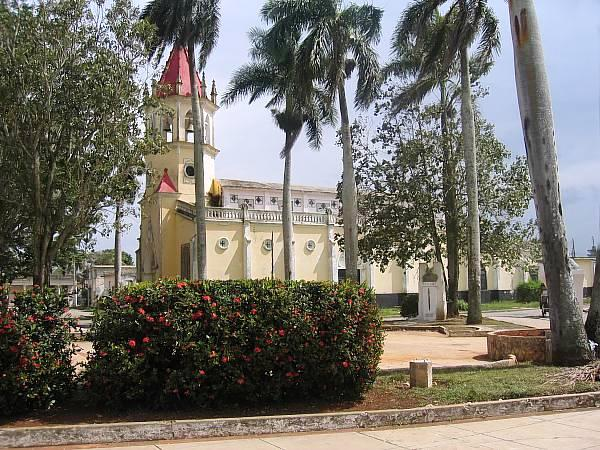
- Town's Catholic church

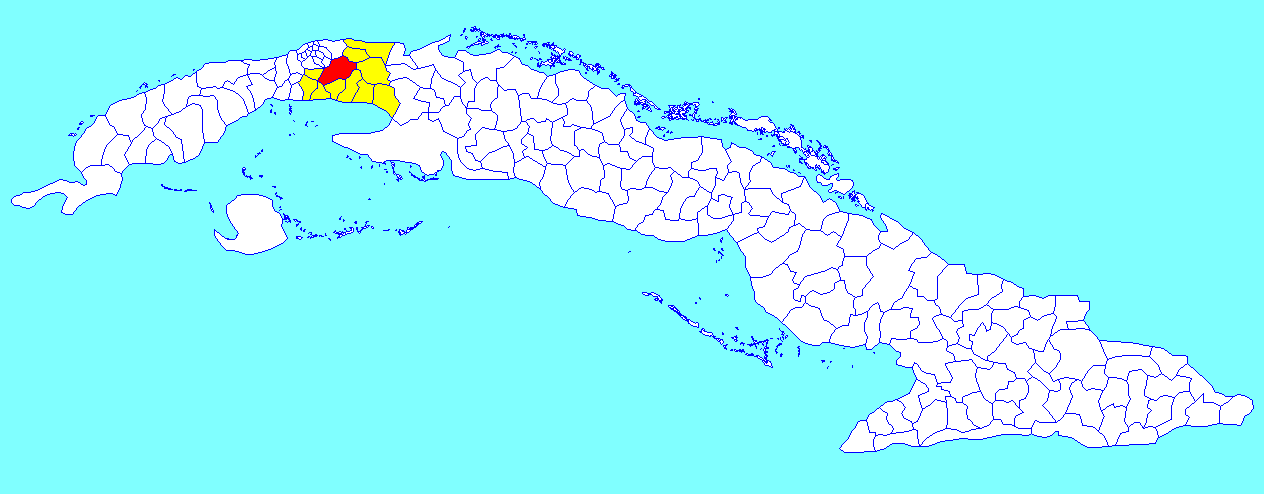
- San José municipality (red) within Mayabeque Province (yellow) and Cuba
- Coordinates: 22°58′4″N 82°09′21″W
- Country: Cuba
- Province: Mayabeque
- Founded: 1778
- Established: 1879 (Municipality)

Area
  - Total: 591 km^{2} (228 sq mi)
- Elevation: 135 m (443 ft)

Population (2022)
  - Total: 81,261
  - Density: 137/km^{2} (356/sq mi)
- Time zone: UTC-5 (EST)
- Area code: +53-47

San José de las Lajas is a municipality and the capital city of the newly formed Mayabeque Province of Cuba, after the segmentation of La Habana Province in 2011. It is located in the center north of the province, and is bisected by the Carretera Central.

It was founded in 1778.

== Geography ==
The municipality includes the villages of Jamaica, Liberación, Tapaste, Pedro Pi, El Perú, Valle del Perú, Morales, Ganuza, Zaragoza, Nazareno, Comunidad Nazareno, El Volcán, La Ruda, Managuaco and San Antonio de las Vegas.

In the municipality there are 7 consejos populares ("popular councils") which include the main town of San José de las Lajas split into Sur ("south") and Norte ("north") and San Antonio de las Vegas, Nazareno, Jamaica, Tapaste, and Zaragoza.

== Demographics ==
In 2022, the municipality of San José de las Lajas had a population of 81,261. The city proper has 37,000 inhabitants. With a total area of 591 km^{2} (228 sq mi), it has a population density of 117.4/km^{2} (304/sq mi).

== Economy ==
San José is the most important economical hub of Mayabeque Province with important industries (metallurgic, mechanical, electrical, building materials, chemical, rum) and a well-developed farming sector.

== Science and Education ==
This municipality hosts the Agrarian University of Havana as well as important country level scientific institutions of the agricultural sciences: CENSA (National Center of Animal Healthcare), ICA (Institute of Animal Science) and INCA (National Institute of Agricultural Sciences), forming together the core of the so named "Havana East Scientific Pole"

== Transport ==
San José counts a railway station, on the Havana-Güines line, served by a line of the Havana Suburban Railway. It is crossed in the middle by the Carretera Central (CC) highway and is served by 2 exits of the A1 motorway. The southwestern area of the municipality, nearby San Antonio de las Vegas, is served by the A3 motorway.

== Sports ==
The baseball stadium "Nelson Fernández" was the venue of the La Habana baseball team Vaqueros (Cowboys) which was the national champion in the 2008-2009 campaign. From 2011, it became the home of the new team Huracanes de Mayabeque.

== See also ==
- Municipalities of Cuba
- List of cities in Cuba
- San José de las Lajas Municipal Museum
