= Guanabo =

- beach town
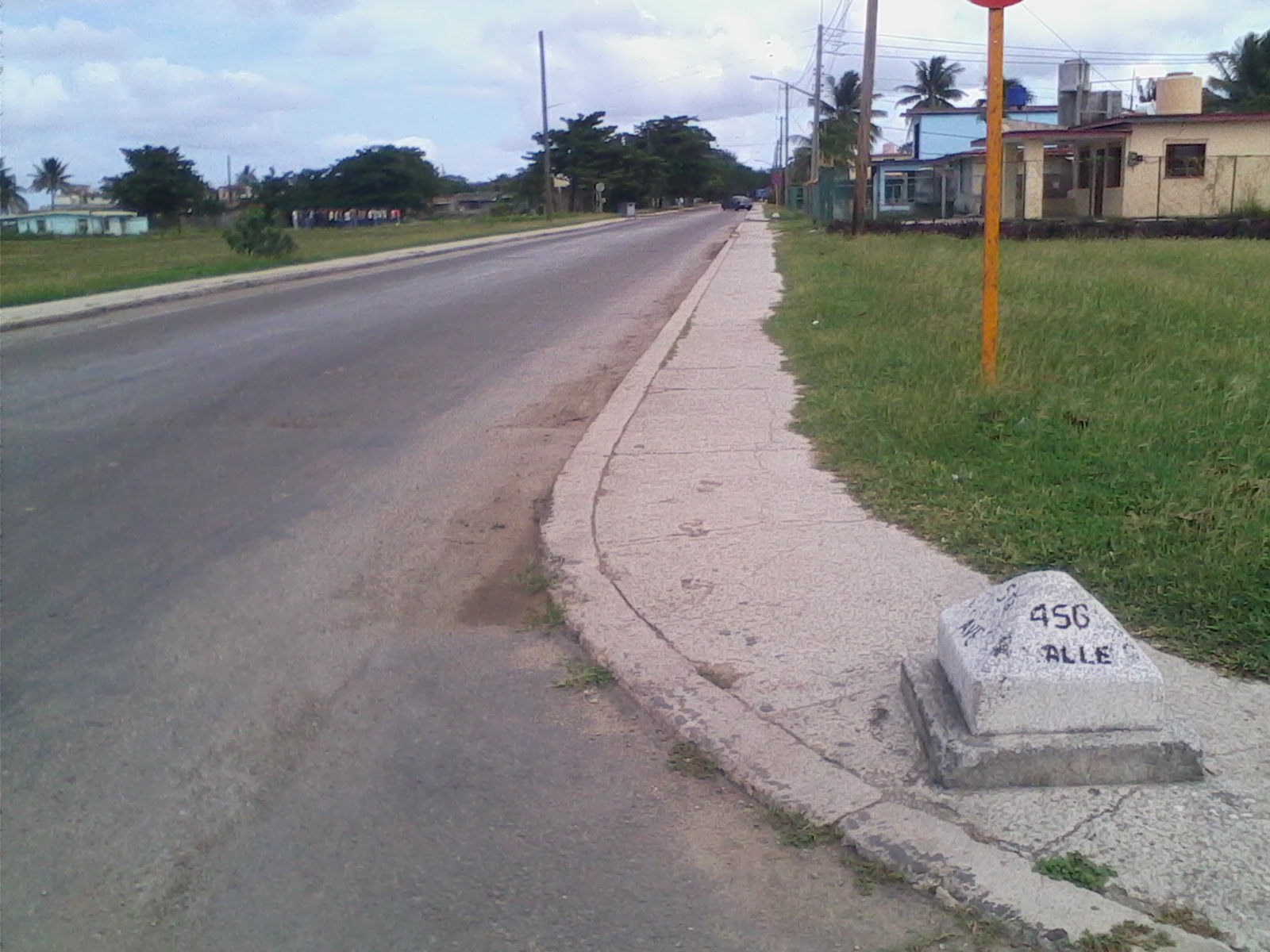
- 5ta Avienda seen in Guanabo

- Location of Guanabo in Cuba
- Coordinates: 23°09′53″N 82°08′21″W
- Country: Cuba
- Province: Ciudad de La Habana
- Municipality: Habana del Este

Guanabo is a beach town in the Ciudad de la Habana Province of Cuba. It is a ward (consejo popular) located within the municipality of Habana del Este halfway between the centre of Havana and Santa Cruz del Norte, at the mouth of the Guanabo River, between the Atlantic Ocean coast and the Sierra del Canchón (mountain range).

== Overview ==
Guanabo is a seaside touristic town, with small scale villas and a few low rise hotels.

The town was founded in 1800. In 1827 it was the place where the Peñas Altas uprising was crushed by troops from Havana (Peñas Altas is a neighbourhood east of Guanabo).

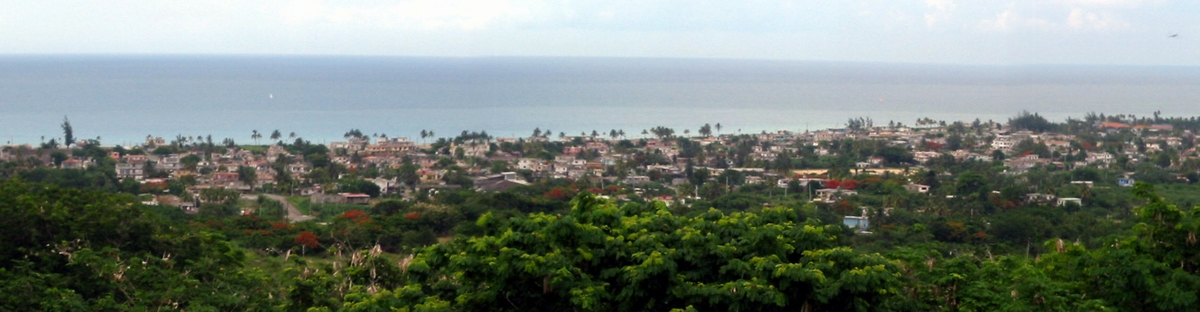
Overview of Guanabo and Atlantic Ocean
