= Reebee Garofalo =

American music educator and activist

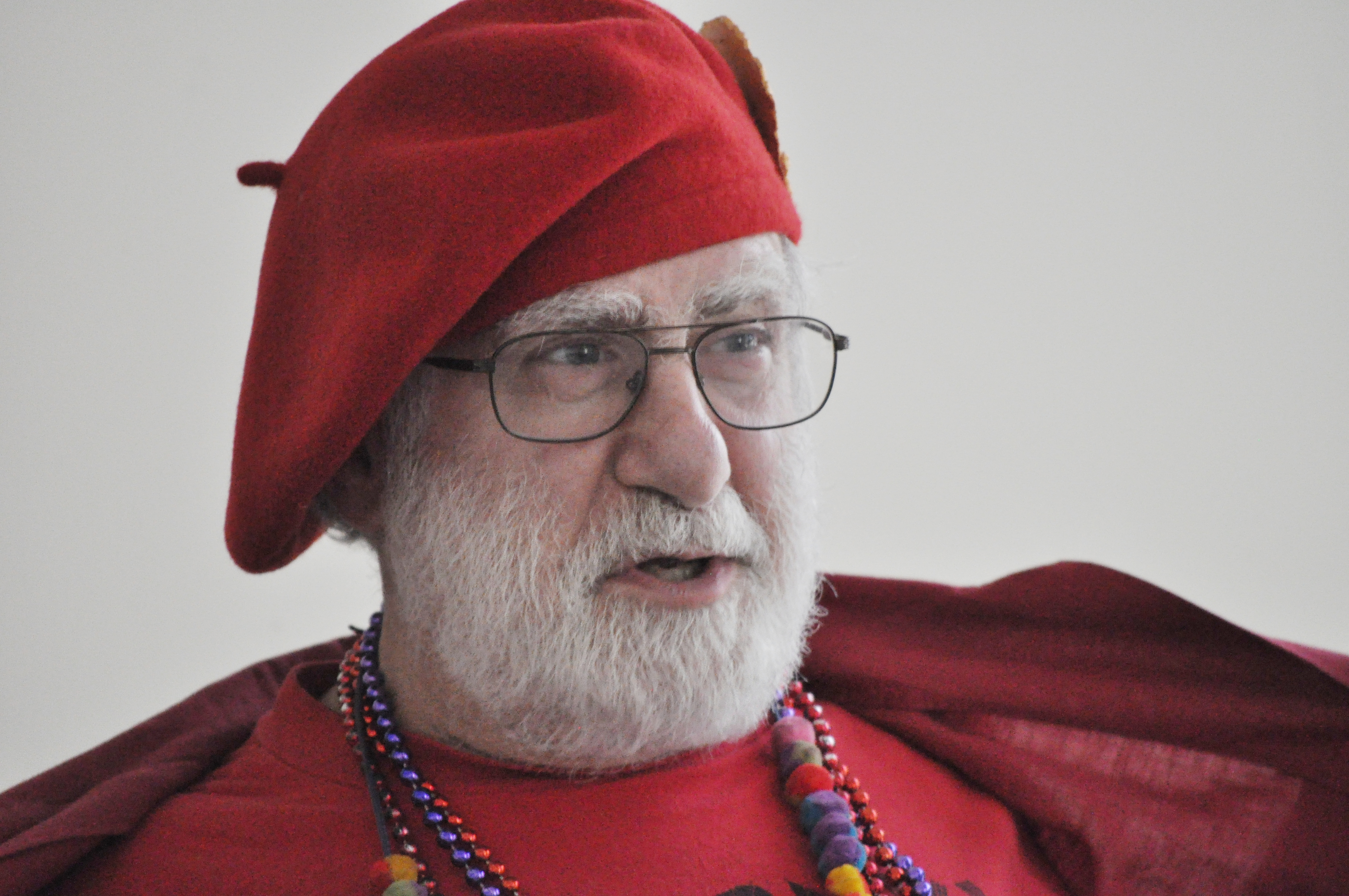
- Garofalo in 2012
- Occupations: musician, educator, activist
- Known for: HONK!
- Website: reebee.net

Reebee Garofalo is an American musician, activist and music scholar known for his work organizing street festivals such as the HONK! Fest and writing books about popular music. Garofalo created a Genealogy of Pop/Rock Music chart which was reproduced in Edward Tufte's book Visual Explanations.

Garofalo earned an EdD from Harvard University in Clinical Psychology and Public Practice in 1974. He was a founding member of Massachusetts Rock Against Racism in 1979. The group, responding to a request from students at the Cambridge Rindge and Latin School created a multimedia presentation called "Rock and Rap" using music and local DJs to highlight how music could bring people together. The group aligned with other progressive organizations and the black community in the 1980s and worked with the Boston Public Schools create video programming that was "youth-oriented anti-racist programming" which was shown in hundreds of thousands of homes in the greater Boston area.

Garofalo taught at the College of Public and Community Service at the University of Massachusetts Boston for thirty-three years and is currently professor emeritus.

== Bibliography ==
- Rock 'n Roll Is Here to Pay: The History & Politics of the Music Industry (1980, with Steve Chapple) ISBN 9780882293950
- Rockin' the Boat: Mass Music & Mass Movements (1991) ISBN 9780896084278
- Policing Pop (2002, with Martin Cloonan) ISBN 9781566399906
- HONK!: A Street Band Renaissance of Music and Activism (2019, with Erin T. Allen and Andrew Snyder) ISBN 9780429672101
- Rockin Out: Popular Music in the U.S.A. (1996) ISBN 9780132343053
- The emergence of rap Cubano: an historical perspective (2004, with Deborah Pacini Hernandez) ISBN 9781351217828
