= San Antonio de las Vegas =

San Antonio de Las Vegas
- Ward
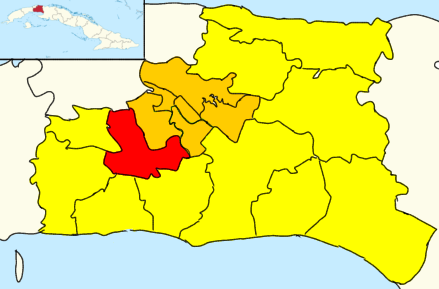
- San Antonio de las Vegas (red) in San José de las Lajas (orange) in Mayabeque (yellow)
- Country: Cuba
- Provinces: Mayabeque
- Municipality: San José de las Lajas

Area
  - Total: 0.74 km^{2} (0.29 sq mi)

Population (2012)
  - Total: 4,066
  - Density: 5,500/km^{2} (14,000/sq mi)
- Postal code: 32700

San Antonio de las Vegas is a consejo popular (ward) in San José de las Lajas, Mayabeque Province, Cuba, a village, and a former municipality.
