= Autopista A4 (Cuba) =

Motorway in Cuba

Autopista A4
- Autopista Este—Oeste
- East-West Motorway
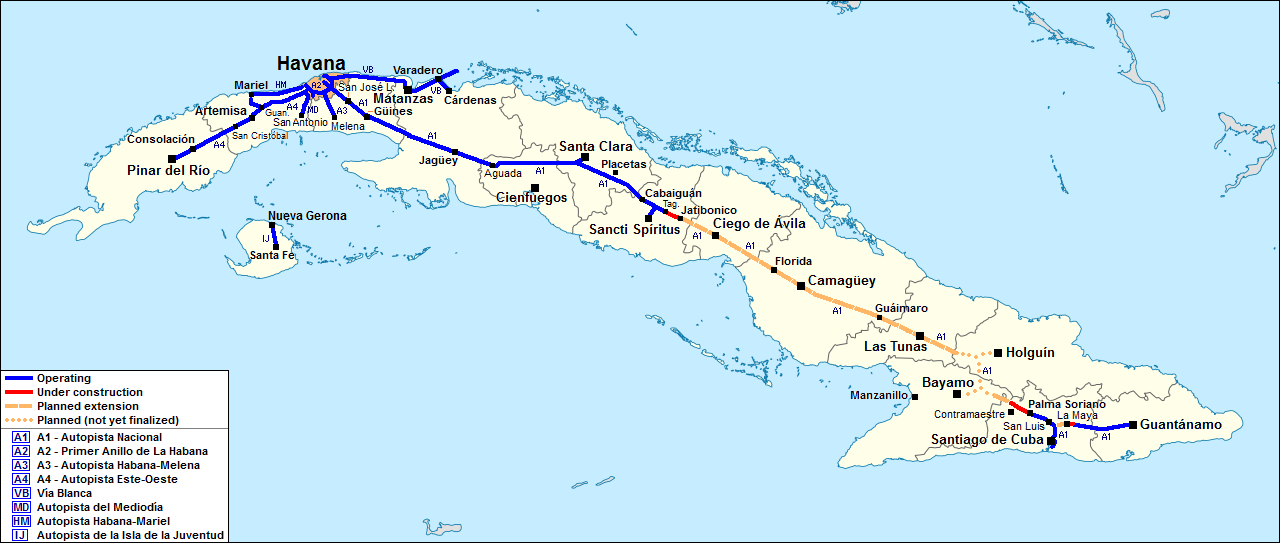
- Map of the Cuban motorway network

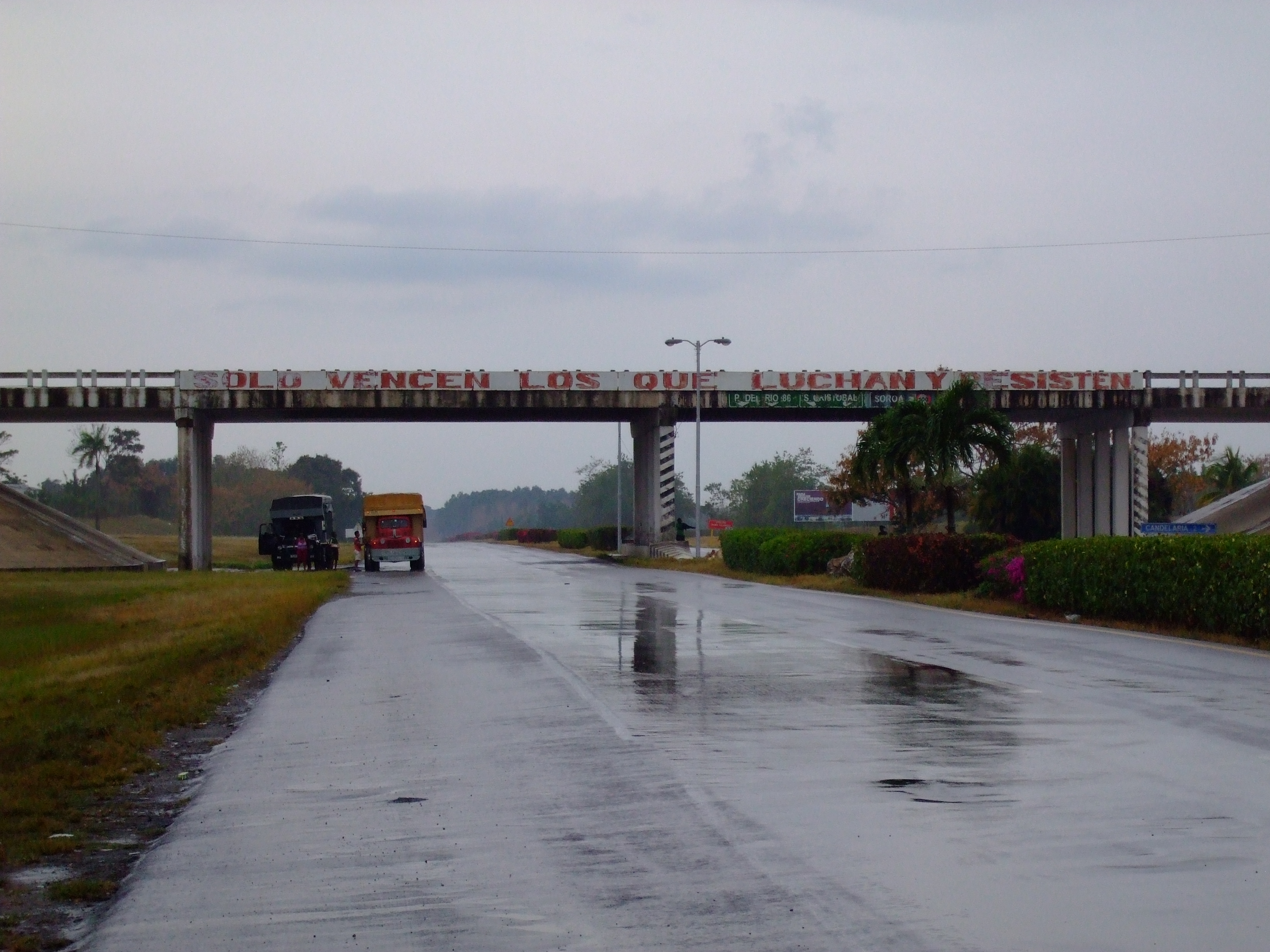
- The A4 at the exit of Candelaria

Route information
- Length: 156 km (97 mi)
- Existed: 1989–present

Major junctions
- East end: Havana
- West end: Pinar del Río

Location
- Country: Cuba
- Major cities: Havana, Guanajay, Artemisa, San Cristóbal, Consolación del Sur, Pinar del Río

Highway system
- Roads in Cuba

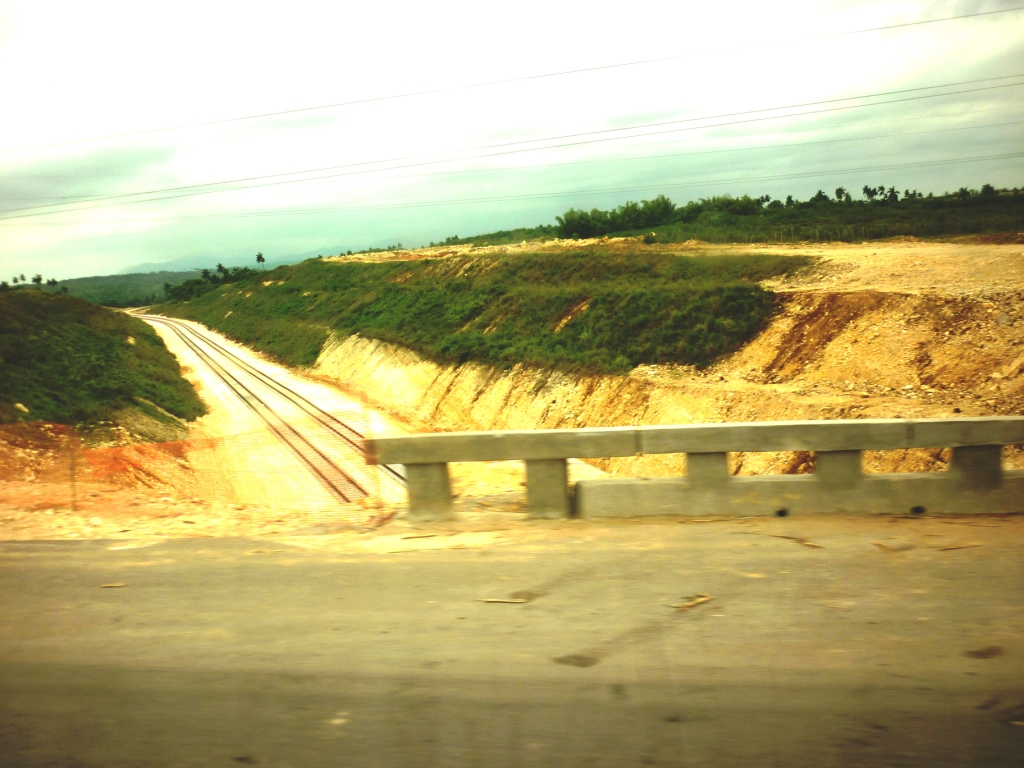
An A4 bridge in Guanajay crossing the new Havana-Mariel railway line

The Autopista A4, signed as the Via a la Vida, known as Autopista Este-Oeste or Autopista Nacional Este-Oeste, is a Cuban motorway linking Havana to Pinar del Río. It is a toll-free road and has a length of 156 km (97 mi). Along with the Autopista A1 (Autopista Nacional), partly built, that will link Havana to Guantánamo, it is classified as part of the whole Autopista Nacional route, spanning the length of the island; as the Carretera Central highway.

== History ==
The motorway, connected to the A1 via the Havana Beltway (A2), was opened on December 19, 1989.

In 2012 the plan of a creation of a more direct route from the A4 motorway to the city of Artemisa was made. They decided to make it a 4 lane highway, with construction beginning in 2015, and completed 2022. This road is commonly referred to as the Vial Autopista–Artemisa (Motorway–Artemisa Road).

== Route ==
The A4 is a dual carriageway with 6 lanes from Havana to Guanajay, 4 lanes from Guanajay to Pinar del Río, and has some at-grade intersections with rural roads. From Guanajay it is a beltway (Autopista ZEDM) linking the A4 to the Port of Mariel.

AUTOPISTA A4 (Autopista Este-Oeste)
Exit	↓km↓	Province	Note
Habana Calle 100	0.0	Havana	
Habana CUJAE–Primer Anillo (link to Havana-Guantánamo and other motorways)	1.7	Havana	
Habana La Lisa	4.9	Havana	
Habana Avenida 23–Autopista del Mediodía (to San Antonio de los Baños)	8.4	Havana	
Bauta	16.7	Artemisa	
Caimito	24.7	Artemisa	
Guanajay-Mariel ( 10-km beltway to the Port of Mariel)	37.0	Artemisa	
Guanajay Sur-El Jobo	41.0	Artemisa	
Vial Autopista–Artemisa			
Artemisa-Cayajabos	54.3	Artemisa	
Las Terrazas	60.4	Artemisa	
Candelaria-Soroa	71.6	Artemisa	
San Cristóbal (to Bahía Honda)	82.4	Artemisa	
Taco Taco-Los Pinos	90.0	Artemisa	
López Peña	95.5	Artemisa	
Los Palacios	105.0	Pinar del Río	
Paso Quemado-Paso Real	112.0	Pinar del Río	
Herradura	125.0	Pinar del Río	
Consolación del Sur	134.0	Pinar del Río	
Puerta de Golpe	141.0	Pinar del Río	
Las Ovas	146.0	Pinar del Río	
Pinar del Río-Viñales	153.0	Pinar del Río	
Pinar del Río	156.0	Pinar del Río	
A4 – Port of Mariel Beltway (Autopista ZEDM)
Exit	↓km↓	Province	Note
Guanajay–A4 (main route)	0.0	Artemisa	
Zayas-Cabañas	1.5	Artemisa	
Mariel-Nodarse (Circuito Norte)	4.1	Artemisa	
Mariel Puerto	10.0	Artemisa	

== See also ==
- Roads in Cuba
- Transport in Cuba
- Infrastructure of Cuba
