= Jamaica, Mayabeque =

Jamaica
- Town
- Coat of arms

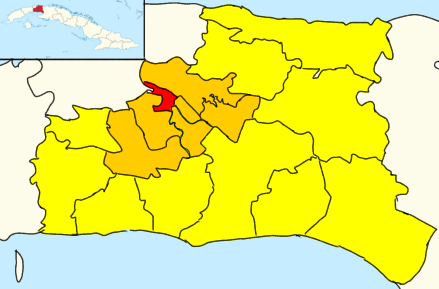
- Jamaica (red) in Las Lajas (orange) in Mayabeque (yellow)

- Location within Cuba
- Coordinates: 22°58′39″N 82°10′11″W
- Country: Cuba
- Province: Mayabeque Province
- Municipality: San José de las Lajas

Population (2015)
  - Total: 15,000

Jamaica is a suburb and ward of San José de las Lajas, Cuba. It’s located on the junction of the Carretera Central and the Jamaica–Tapaste Road (2–381).

== Transportation ==
Jamaica in located on the Ramal Güines Railway line, with the Havana–Palos route having a stop at Jamaica.

Jamaica is located on the Carretera Central (Avenida 47 in San José de las Lajas), where it has a bus stop on the Local Route 1 bus from Micro I to Tapaste.
