= Guiteras =

Guiteras is a surname. Notable people with the surname include:

- Antonio Guiteras (1906–1935), Cuban politician
- Juan Guiteras (1852–1925), Cuban physician and pathologist
- Ramon Guiteras (1858–1917), American urologist, cousin of Juan
