= Santa María del Mar, Havana =

Beach in Havana, Cuba

Santa María del Mar
- Beach
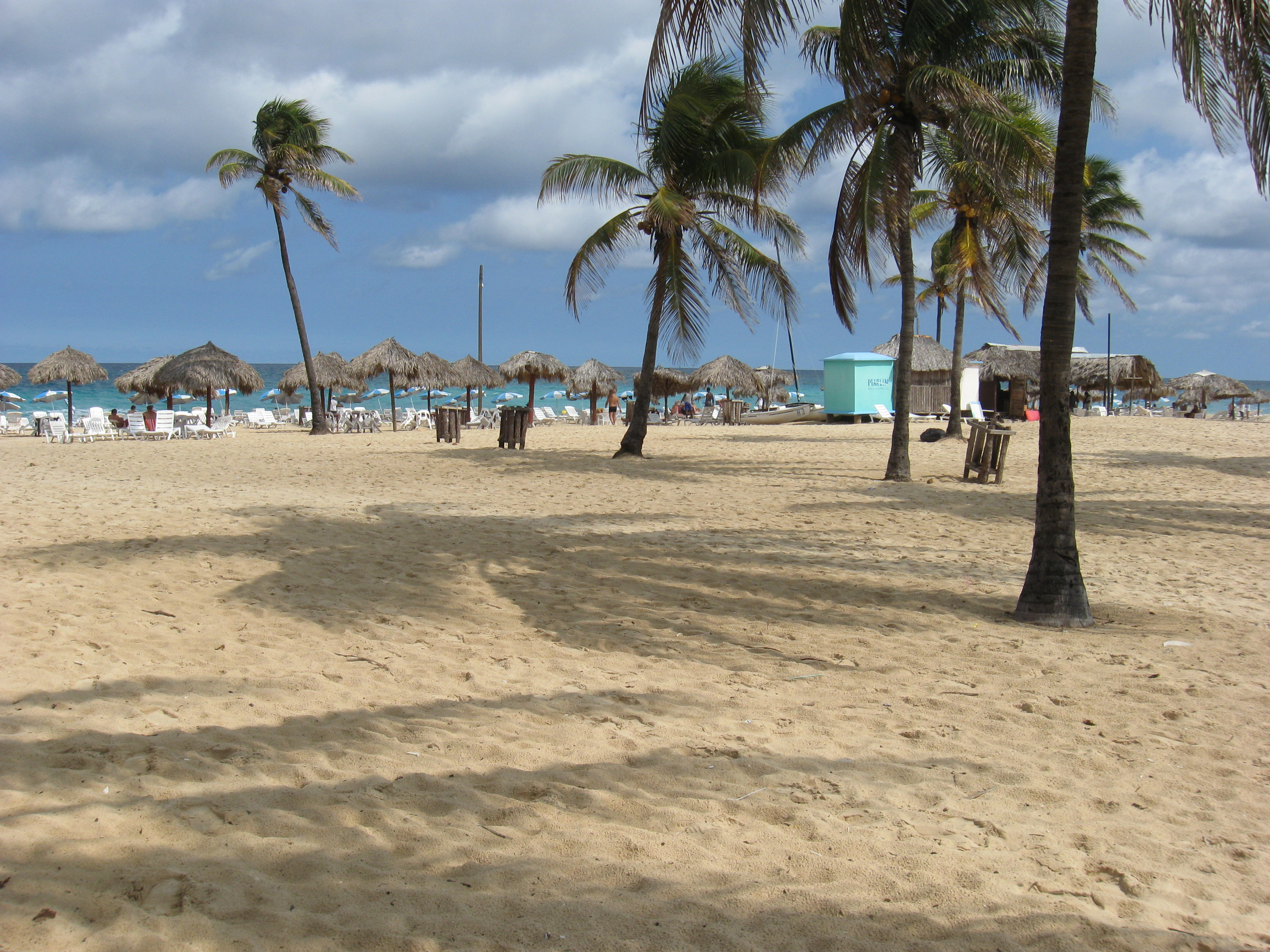
- Santa María del Mar (2012)

- Location within Cuba
- Coordinates: 23°10′21″N 82°11′30″W
- Location: Havana, Cuba
- Water bodies: Straits of Florida

Santa María del Mar is a sandy beach located 20 km (12 mi) east of Havana, Cuba along the Via Blanca highway.

== Overview ==
It is a segment of a chain of beaches called the Eastern Beaches (Spanish: Playas del Este) which extend for 24 km (15 mi) along the north coast of Havana province in the municipality of Habana del Este.
