= Habana del Este =

- Municipality of Havana
- Guanabo Beach

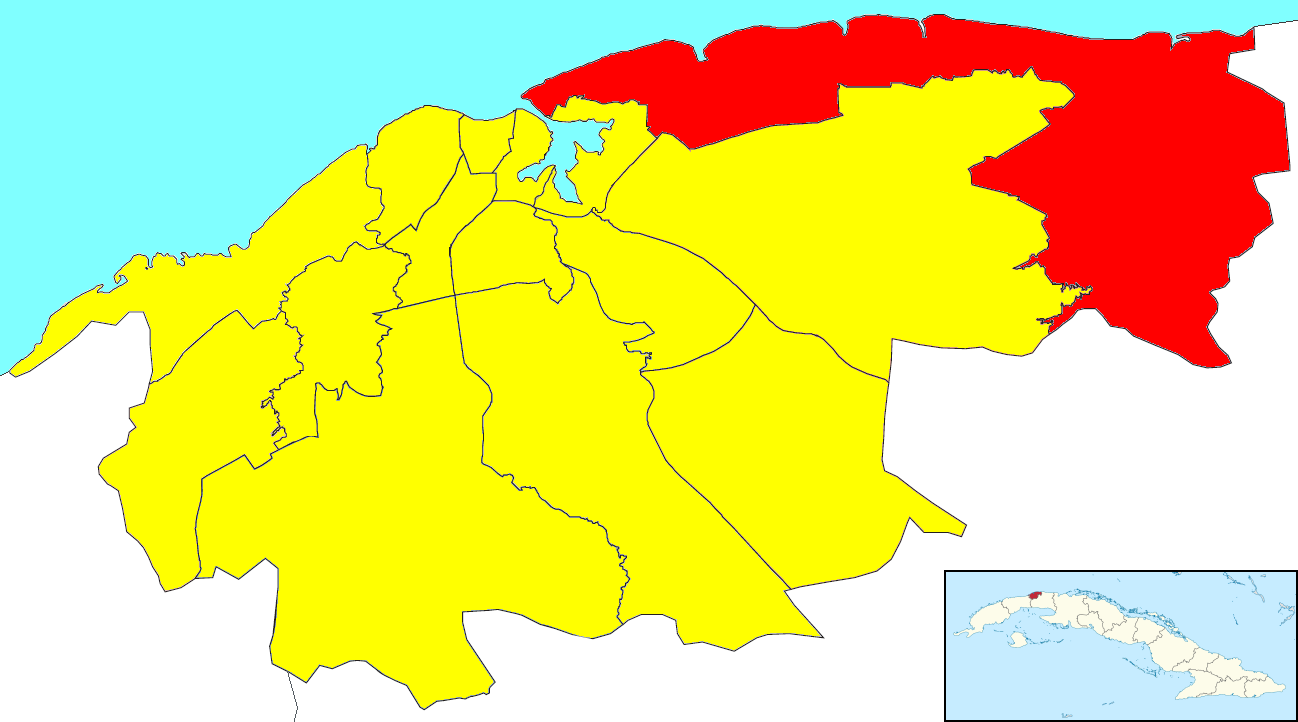
- Location of Habana del Este in Havana
- Coordinates: 23°09′33.0″N 82°16′15.8″W
- Country: Cuba
- Province: Ciudad de La Habana
- Wards (Consejos Populares): Alamar Este, Alamar-Playa, Alturas de Alamar, Camilo Cienfuegos, Campo Florido, Cojímar, Guanabo, Guiteras

Area
  - Total: 145 km^{2} (56 sq mi)

Population (2022)
  - Total: 173,457
  - Density: 1,200/km^{2} (3,100/sq mi)
- Time zone: UTC-5 (EST)
- Area code: +53-7

Habana del Este (Spanish for "East Havana"), also spelled La Habana del Este, is one of the 15 municipalities or boroughs (municipios in Spanish) forming the city of Havana, Cuba.

== Geography ==
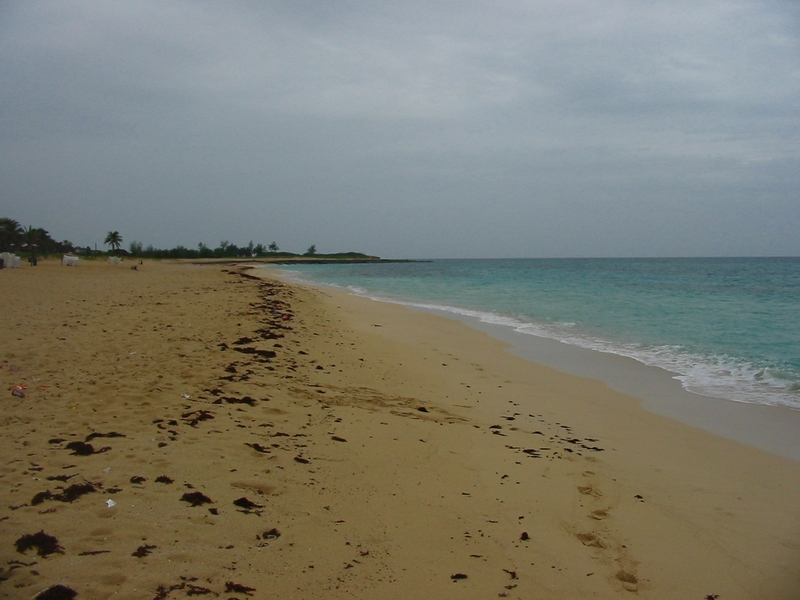
Tarará Beach

As its name indicates it is on the eastern side of the city, and includes the overspill towns of Camilo Cienfuegos and Alamar as well as the beach towns of Boca Ciega, Tarará, Santa María del Mar and Guanabo.

=== Beaches ===
The chain of beaches called the Eastern Beaches (Spanish: Playas del Este) extend for 15 miles (24 km) along the north coast of Havana City province. The beaches are (named from West to East): Tarará; El Mégano; Bacuranao (has a bay shape, thick sand and a small Spanish fortress on its western side); Santa María del Mar; Boca Ciega; Guanabo; La Veneciana and Brisas del Mar. The Eastern Beaches are a popular tourist spot with excellent natural conditions, though tourist facilities are scarce and have yet to be expanded.

== See also ==
- Havana Tunnel
