= Cojímar =

Small fishing village east of Havana, Cuba

- Fishing village
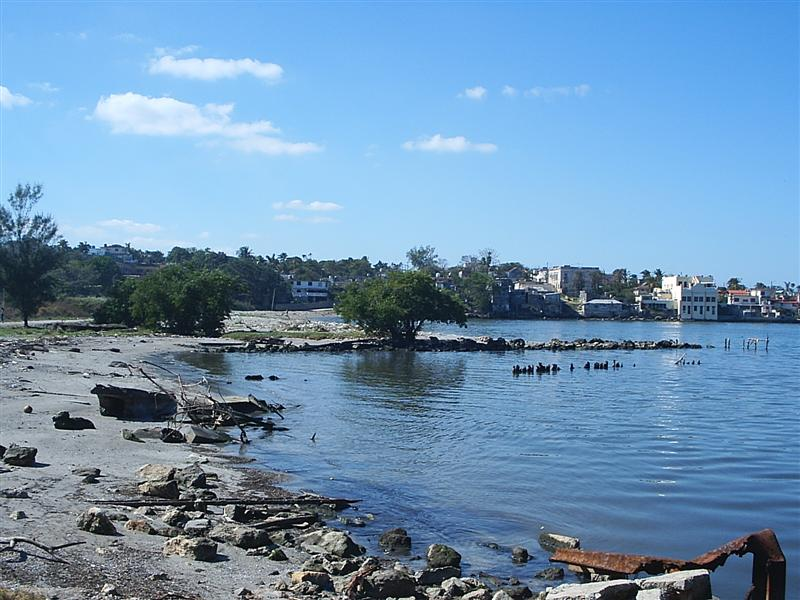

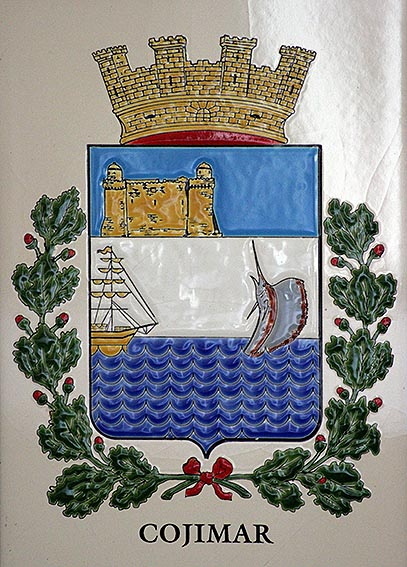
- Coat of arms
- Etymology: Derived from the Taíno language, meaning "entrance of water into fertile land"
- Motto: "Cojímar, where the sea meets history"
- Interactive map of Cojímar
- Coordinates: 23.135°N 82.394°W
- Country: Cuba
- Province: La Habana
- Municipality: Havana del Este

Government
  - Type: Local government

Area
  - Total: 4.2 km^{2} (1.6 sq mi)
- Elevation: 10 m (33 ft)

Population (est. 2006)
  - Total: 20,390
  - Density: 4,900/km^{2} (13,000/sq mi)
- Demonym: Cojimareño/a
- Time zone: UTC-5 (CST)
  - Summer (DST): UTC-4 (CDT)

Cojímar is a historic fishing village located in the municipality of Havana del Este, Cuba. Situated on the northern coast of the island, approximately 7 kilometers east of Havana, Cojímar is known for its cultural significance, history, and natural environment. The town was the residence of the American author Ernest Hemingway, who lived there for a time and kept his fishing boat, the Pilar, in the town. Cojímar's historical roots date back to Cuba's colonial period, and has played an important role in the maritime and cultural history of Havana.

== Etymology ==
The name Cojímar is derived from the Taíno language, the language of the indigenous people of Cuba. The name is believed to mean "entrance of water into fertile land," reflecting the town's geographical connection to the Cojímar River and the surrounding fertile land areas that have supported agricultural activity for centuries.

== Geography ==
Cojímar is located on the northern coast of Cuba, along the Gulf of Mexico, approximately 7 kilometers east of the Cuban capital, Havana. It lies within the municipality of Havana del Este and is bordered by the Cojímar River to the south and the coastline to the north. The region is characterized by a flat, coastal plain and features rocky, eroded limestone formations, with a number of dientes de perro (dog's teeth) rock formations created by the marine erosion process.

The Cojímar River, which flows from the Havana to Matanzas plain, is a notable feature of the region. The river provides freshwater to the surrounding areas and has historically supported agriculture. The highest point in the area is Loma Urnía, located near educational institutions in the region.

The town's coastline is dotted with small coves, sandy beaches, and rocky outcroppings, which makes it a popular site for both locals and tourists. Its proximity to Havana has made it a key part of the capital's extended urban area.

== Climate ==
Cojímar experiences a tropical climate, with hot, humid conditions year-round. Temperatures rarely dip below 20 °C (68 °F) and can reach up to 30 °C (86 °F) during the summer months. Rainfall is most frequent from May to October, with September being the wettest month. The area receives around 1,400 mm (55 inches) of rainfall annually. The high humidity levels, which average around 80%, are influenced by its coastal location.

Hurricanes and tropical storms are a significant concern in Cojímar, especially during the hurricane season from June to November. These events occasionally lead to flooding and damage along the coastline.

== History ==
=== Colonial foundations ===
The settlement of Cojímar dates back to the mid-16th century. In 1554, the Spanish colonial authorities established a permanent settlement in the area, which initially consisted of fishermen, sailors, and enslaved Africans. Due to its strategic location along the coast, the settlement soon became an important site for maritime activities.

In 1649, the construction of the Cojímar Fortress was completed as part of a defensive effort against pirate attacks, which were a frequent occurrence along the Cuban coastline during the period. The fortress is often considered the formal founding point of the town, and it remains a historical landmark today. The completion of the fortress also marked the establishment of Cojímar as a more recognized and fortified settlement.

=== 19th century ===
The 19th century saw Cojímar grow in prominence as a seaside resort for the upper classes of Havana. The discovery of mineral springs in the area led to the establishment of therapeutic baths, and the town became a popular destination for those seeking relaxation and medical treatments. The town also built key infrastructure, such as public baths and a chapel dedicated to Our Lady of Mount Carmel, the patron saint of seafarers.

In 1879, Cojímar began its annual celebration in honor of Our Lady of Mount Carmel, a tradition that continues today. The town's population grew steadily during this period, with more visitors coming from Havana to enjoy the town's peaceful coastal environment.

=== Early 20th century ===
The early 20th century brought new developments to Cojímar, including the opening of the Hotel Campoamor in 1907, which became a popular venue for Havana's elite. Cojímar also saw the establishment of other resort-like properties, such as the Residencial Loma and the Quinta Pedralves.

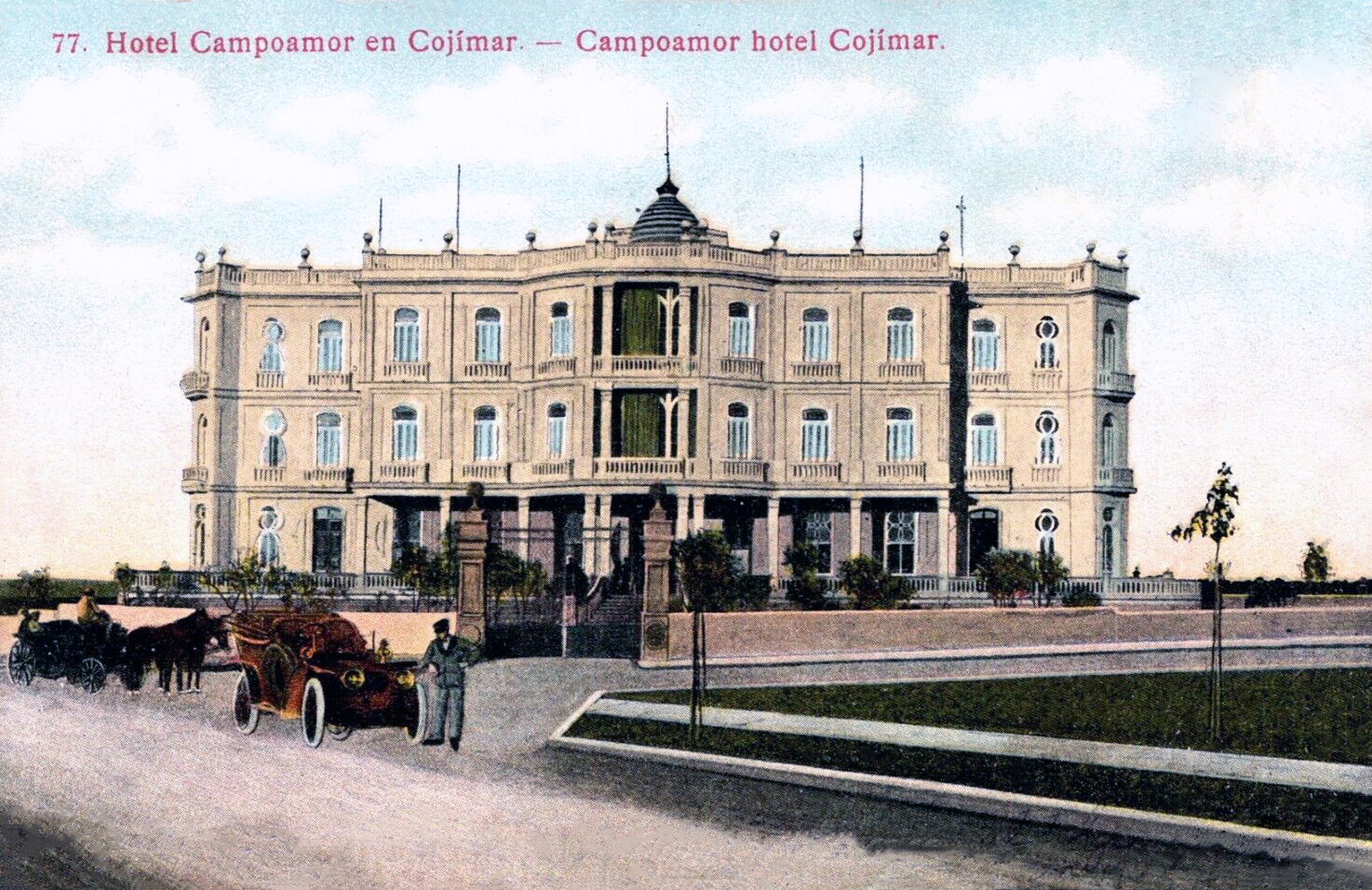
Hotel Campoamor

However, by the mid-20th century, tourism to Cojímar declined as larger and more modern resorts, particularly in Varadero, became more popular. Despite this, Cojímar continued to attract visitors interested in its historical and cultural connections, particularly those related to its association with Hemingway.

=== Post-revolutionary era ===
After the Cuban Revolution in 1959, Cojímar's role as a tourist destination faded, and the town became more integrated into the greater Havana metropolitan area. The construction of the Vía Blanca highway in the 1940s provided easier access to other parts of Havana, which shifted some of the traffic away from Cojímar. Despite these changes, the town remained a cultural hub, especially due to its connection to Ernest Hemingway.

Hemingway lived in Cojímar for several years, and the town's La Terraza restaurant became a famous haunt for the writer. Hemingway's boat, the Pilar, was docked at Cojímar’s marina, and he often sailed from the town for fishing expeditions. Today, Hemingway's legacy continues to attract visitors to Cojímar, with many coming to learn about his time in the town and visit the locations that were significant in his life.

== Population statistics ==
The population of Cojímar has grown significantly over the years. The first documented census in 1879 recorded a population of 1,613 people. By the early 20th century, the population had grown considerably, with the 1943 census recording a population of 7,051. The most recent census in 2016 recorded a population of 21,102 residents, reflecting the continued urbanization and residential development in the area.

== Local politics ==
Cojímar is part of the larger Havana del Este municipality and shares in the governance structure of the city of Havana. Local political activities focus on maintaining the town's historical and cultural heritage, as well as addressing issues such as coastal erosion, flooding, and urban development.

== Transportation ==
Transportation to and from Cojímar has evolved over the years. The early 20th century saw the introduction of an electric train service that connected Cojímar to the rest of Havana, facilitating tourism and commerce. This rail line was particularly important in the period when Cojímar was a popular resort.

Today, Cojímar is accessible by road, with the Vía Blanca highway providing easy access to the rest of the city. The town is served by local buses and taxis.

The closest major airport is José Martí International Airport, located about 20 minutes away by car. Cojímar is also accessible by ferry from nearby coastal areas.

== Notable residents ==
- Camila Cabello - pop singer and songwriter
- Ernest Hemingway - American writer and Nobel Prize laureate, who lived in Cojímar during the 1940s and frequently visited La Terraza
- William Levy - actor known for his roles in telenovelas and Hollywood films
- René Touzet - Cuban composer and pianist
