= Infrastructure of Cuba =

Cuban infrastructure is significant and includes: massive Spanish fortifications built in principal ports (e.g. El Morro castles in Havana (1589) and Santiago; Castillo San Salvador de la Punta; (finished by 1630); La Fuerza(finished 1577); San Carlos de La Cabaña the largest in the Americas; El Principe; Atares around Havana Bay).

== Overview ==
Railroads were first built in the late colonial period and finished in the first part of the 20th century. Vital sanitation facilities were constructed in the US period. The Presidential Palace was built between 1913 and 1919 under presidents Gómez y de Menocal, and designed by a group that included architect Rodolfo Maruri.

The Cuban Capitol was built on older foundations in 1926 during Gerardo Machado's presidency, the building contains the third largest indoor statue in the world; this is the statue of the Cuban Republic, which represents La Patria the motherland, which in the Latin American tradition is female. This statue was sculpted Angelo Zanelli, and the model was "habanera "Lily Válty'.

The central highway (Carretera Central), which starts in Pinar del Rio and ends in the former province of Oriente, was also constructed during the Gerardo Machado administration. There are tunnels in Havana under the bay and under the Almendares River, and some highways in the old Oriente Province, Via Azul and Via Mulata, and Havana-Matanzas Via Blanca, all of which were completed in the second Fulgencio Batista period. The main road into Baracoa was completed in the 1960s, whilst in the since the late 1980s, causeways have been built out to neighbouring cays in order to open them up for tourist development. However, these causeways do not allow seawater to circulate freely and in consequence this has caused significant ecological damage. A complex network of massive dams and complex semi-secret underground fortifications were built in the present Fidel Castro period.

In addition there are significant numbers of historic buildings and reinforced concrete high rises built in the Republican period. Statues and other monuments dot the island. Each construction has its own particular story that often relates to important events in the history of the island. For instance, some of the cobblestones that surround the Havana docks were brought in from Sweden, on the return trips of ships smuggling sugar into Britain during World War I.
