= Cotorro =

- Municipality of Havana
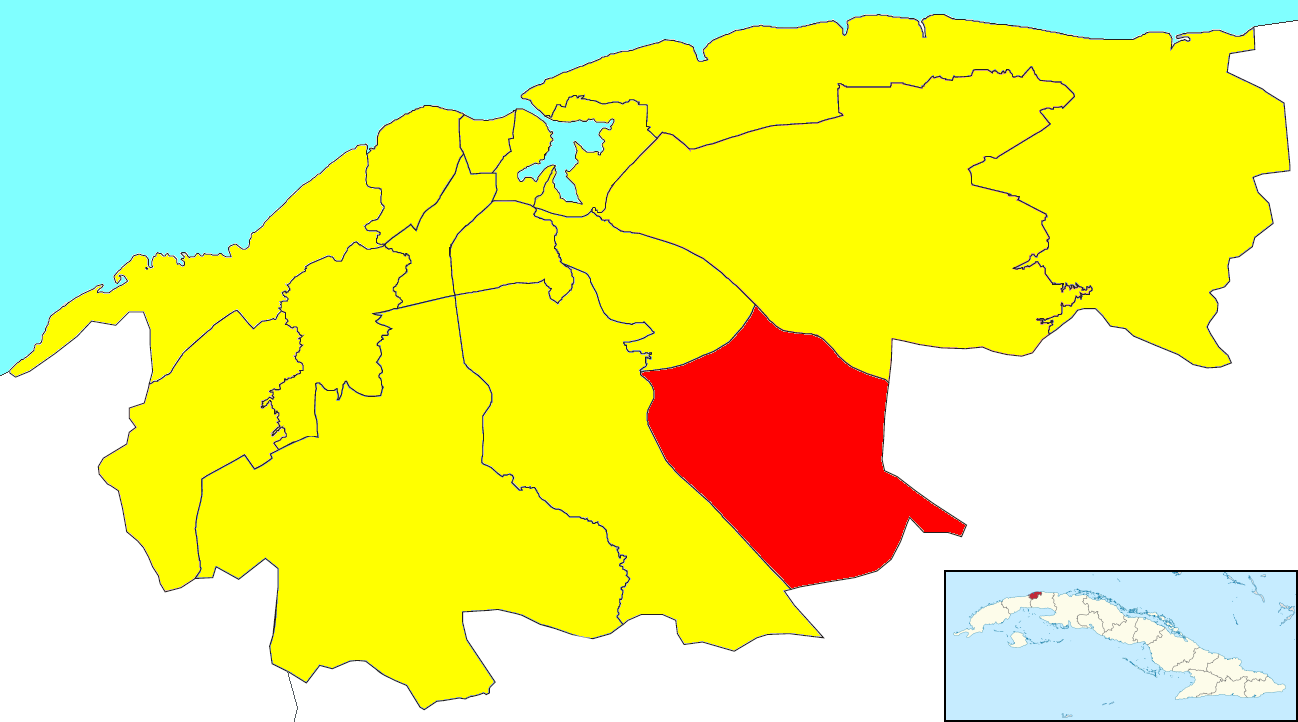
- Location of Cotorro in Havana
- Coordinates: 23°01′34″N 82°14′51″W
- Country: Cuba
- Province: Havana
- Wards (Consejos Populares): Alberro, Cuatro Caminos, Lotería, San Pedro-Centro Cotorro, Santa Maria del Rosario, Magdalena-Torriente

Government
  - President: Yaima Valle Barrios

Area
  - Total: 66 km^{2} (25 sq mi)

Population (2004)
  - Total: 74,650
  - Density: 1,131/km^{2} (2,930/sq mi)
- Time zone: UTC-5 (EST)
- Area code: +53-7

Cotorro, or San Pedro del Cotorro, is one of the 15 municipalities (municipios in Spanish) in the city of Havana, Cuba.

== Overview ==
The municipality is situated by the Carretera Central (Central Highway), and main autopista (motorway). Cotorro is 16 km from Old Havana. Its foundation dates to 1822. By the end of the 1950s, Cotorro had grown in such a way that it was exceeding in extension and population to the head of the municipality.

== Twin towns – sister cities ==
- Campinas, Brazil
