= Havana Suburban Railway =

Cuban rail network

Havana Suburban Railway Red del ferrocarril suburbano de La Habana
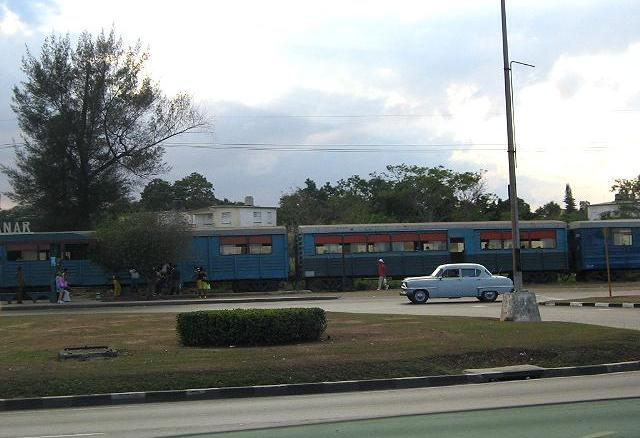
- A suburban train at Havana Fontanar station

Overview
- Owner: Ferrocarriles de Cuba
- Locale: Havana
- Transit type: Suburban rail
- Number of lines: 8

Operation
- Operator: Ferrocarriles de Cuba

Technical
- Track gauge: 1,435 mm (4 ft 8 1/2 in) standard gauge
- Electrification: 600 V DC (Limited to Hershey Railway)
System map
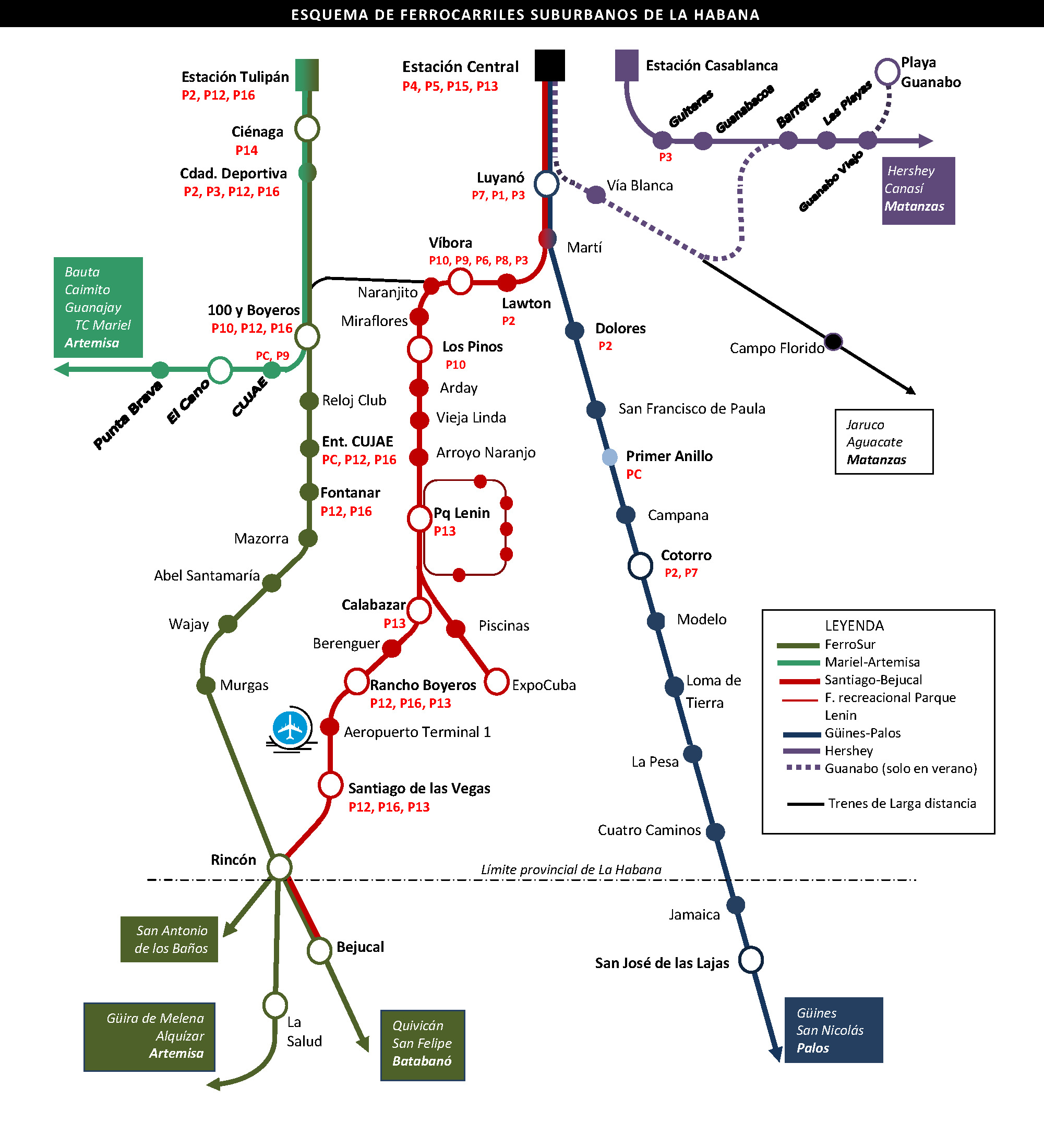

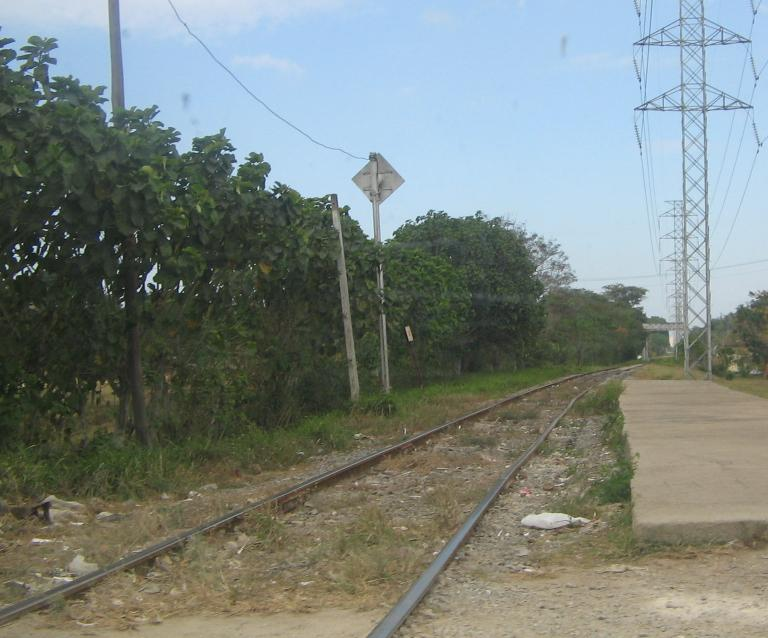
Havana Entronque Cujae station

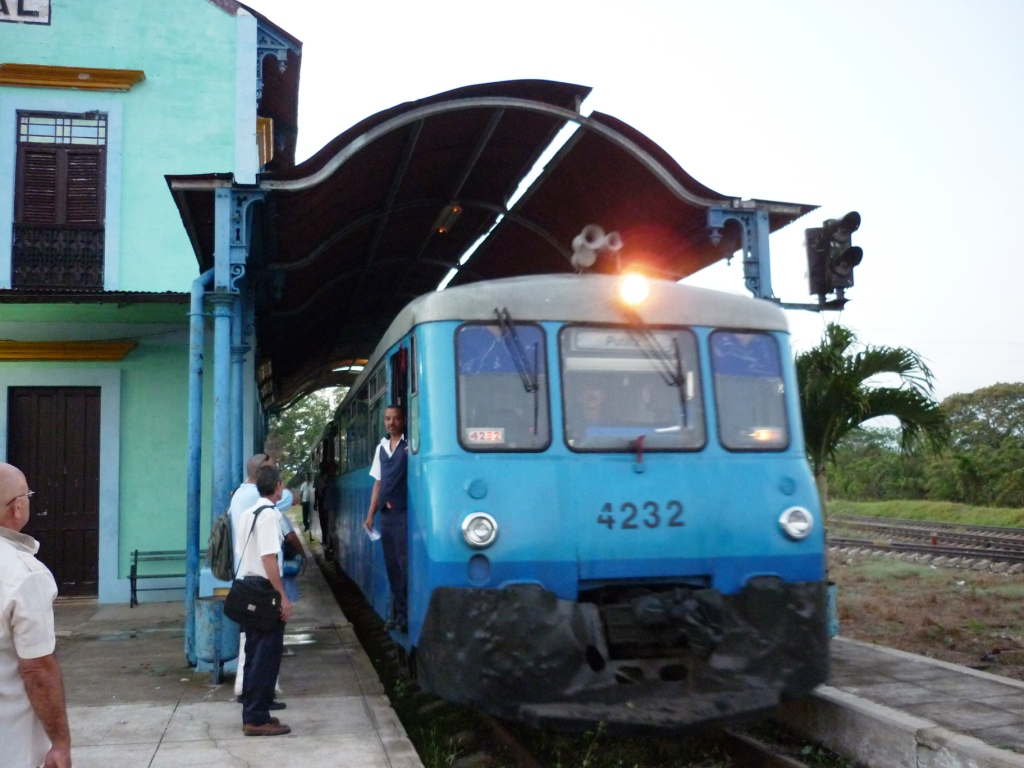
A suburban train at Bejucal station

The Havana Suburban Railway (Spanish: Red del ferrocarril suburbano de La Habana) is a passenger suburban rail network serving the city of Havana, capital of Cuba, and its suburbs. Owned by the national company Ferrocarriles de Cuba, it represents the only suburban rail system of the Caribbean island.

== Overview ==
Outside Havana, the network serves some towns of its metropolitan area in Artemisa and Mayabeque provinces. A little part of Matanzas Province is served by the only electrified line of Cuba, the Hershey Electric Railway from Havana Casablanca station to Matanzas.

=== Havana subway plans ===
Plans for the construction of a rapid transit network in Havana was studied in 1921. Other plans for a subway, based on Russian networks, were studied in the late 1970s and 1980s, due to the relationship between Cuba and the USSR. After the 1991 dissolution of the Soviet Union and the consequent lack of funds of the Cuban government, the proposal for a Havana Metro was abandoned.

== Routes ==
The network consists of 8 lines, departing from the 3 terminal stations of Havana: Central (4 lines), Tulipán (or 19 de Noviembre, 3 lines) and Casablanca (1 line).

1	Havana Central ↔ Hv Cotorro ↔ San José de las Lajas ↔ Güines ↔ Palos
2	~~Havana Central ↔ Hv Calabazar ↔ Hv Aeropuerto T1 ↔ Hv Santiago de Las Vegas ↔ Bejucal~~ Not operational as of 2021
3	~~Havana Central ↔ Hv Parque Lenin ↔ Hv ExpoCuba~~ Not operational as of 2021
4	Havana Central ↔ Hv Guanabo Viejo ↔ Hv Playa de Guanabo
5	Havana Tulipán ↔ Hv Rincón ↔ San Antonio de los Baños
6	Havana Tulipán ↔ Hv Rincón ↔ Güira de Melena ↔ Alquízar ↔ Artemisa (West Line)
7	Havana Tulipán ↔ Hv Rincón ↔ Bejucal ↔ Batabanó ↔ Surgidero (South Line)
8	Havana Casablanca ↔ Hv Guanabo Viejo ↔ Santa Cruz del Norte ↔ Matanzas (Hershey Line)

- Note: the stations marked with "Hv" are located in the city of Havana.

== Services ==
The network has limited use as urban transport and is primarily conceived to serve the suburbs and towns surrounding the capital. The price is very cheap and is subsidized by the state. Train frequency is low and varies between two and five daily departures per route and convoys are composed of two or three cars and diesel locomotives on some routes. Several stations are linked to the MetroBus, a bus network and the principal public urban transport of Havana. As of 2012, the Cuban government was making efforts to revitalize the rail network and expand the service.

== See also ==
- Havana MetroBus
