= Havana MetroBus =

Public bus network in Cuba

Havana MetroBus MetroBus de La Habana
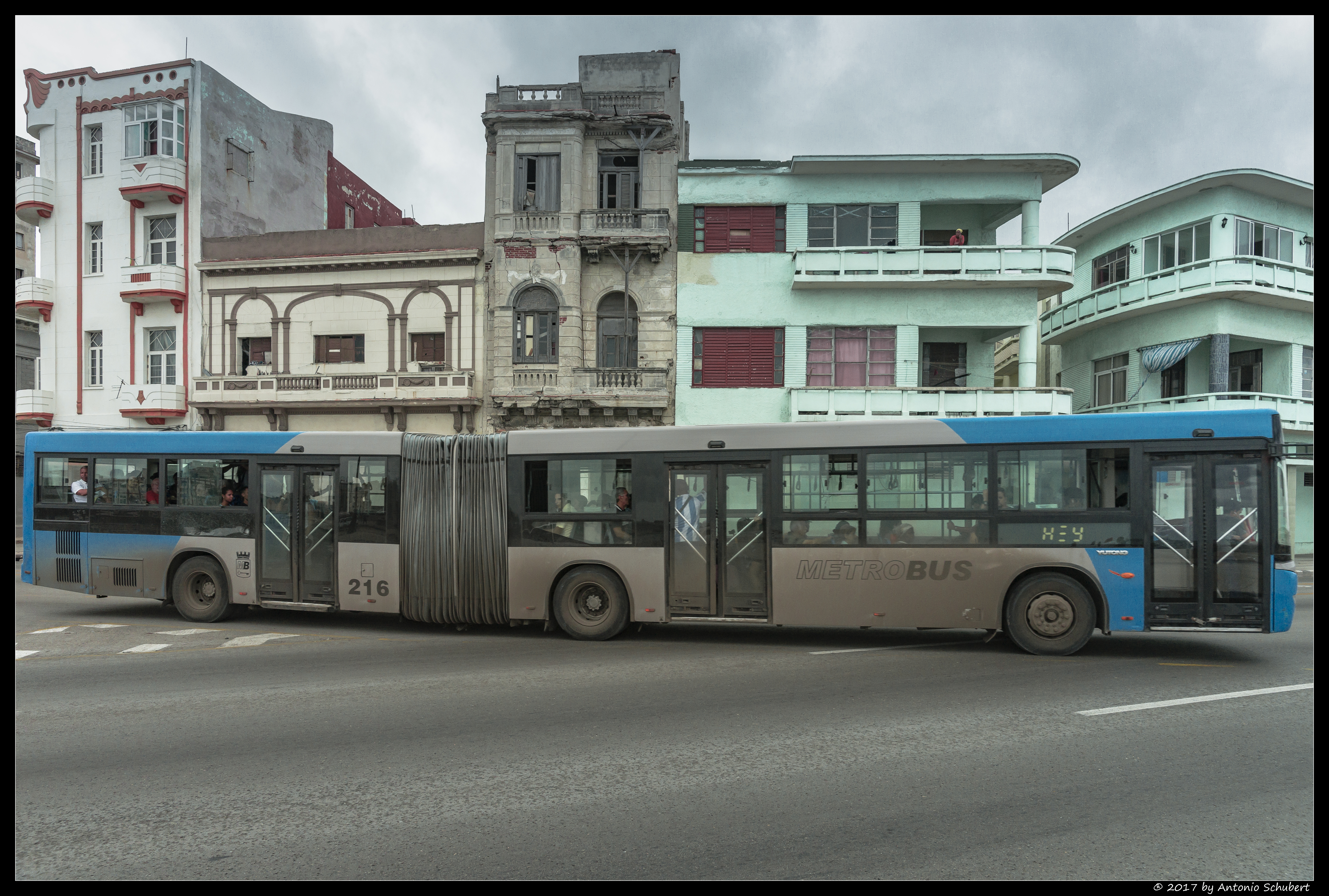
- A Havana MetroBus Yutong articulated bus in 2017

Overview
- Locale: Havana, Cuba
- Transit type: Public bus transport
- Number of lines: 17

Operation
- Operator: MetroBus de La Habana
System map
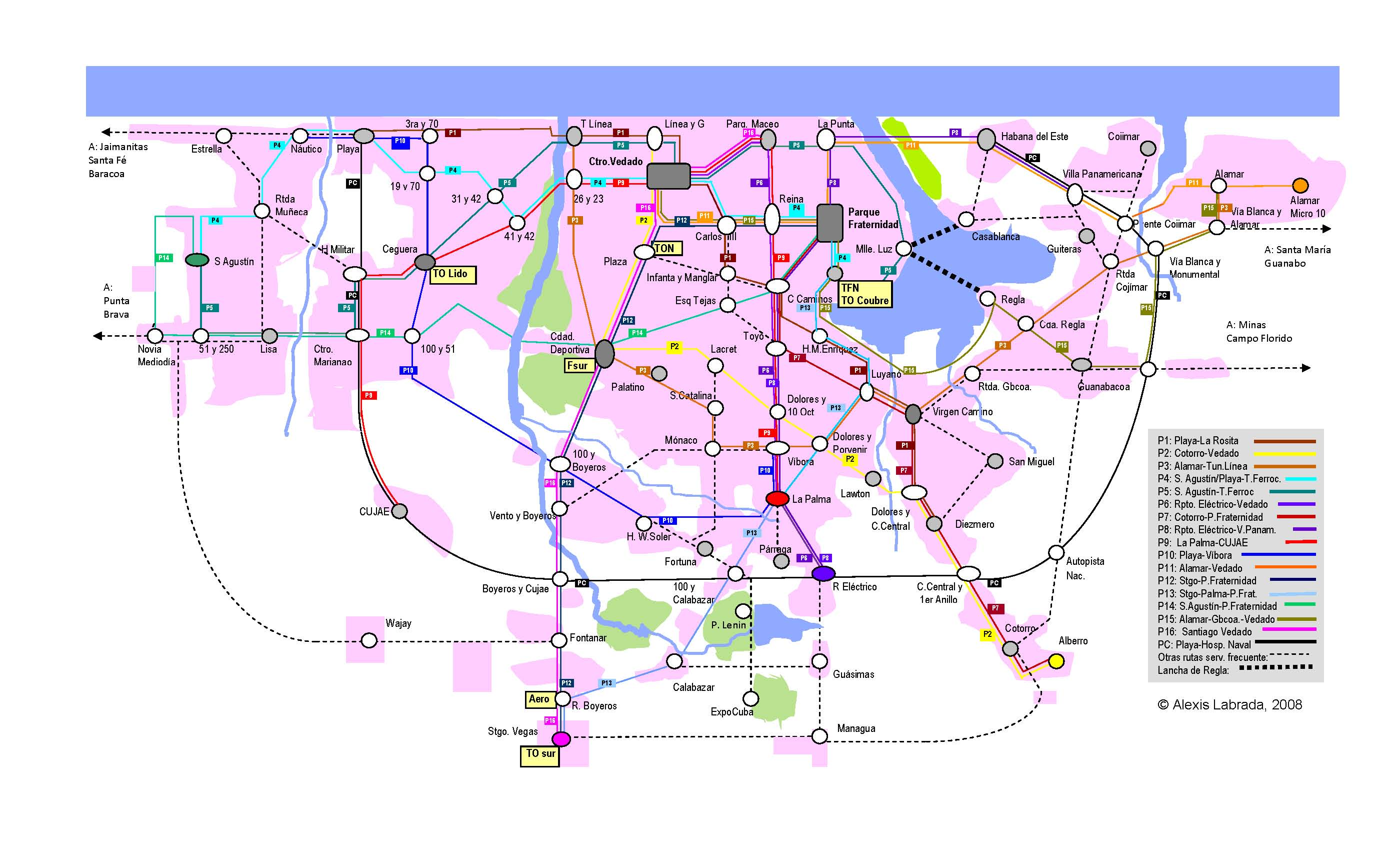

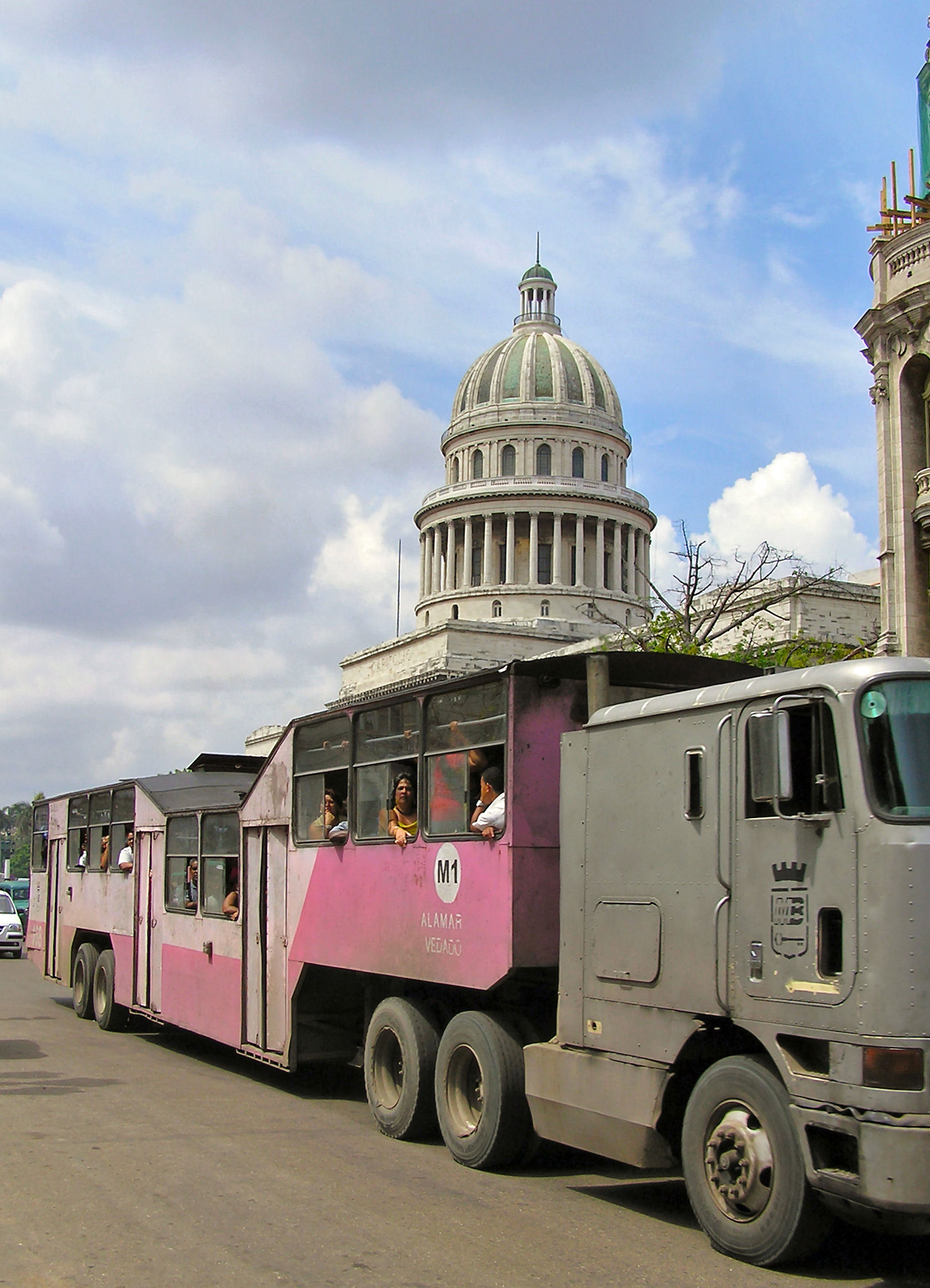
A Camelito bus near El Capitolio building. The MB logo is pictured on the driver's door.

The Havana MetroBus (Spanish: MetroBus de La Habana), shortened as MB, is a public bus network serving the city of Havana, Cuba. It is the principal public transport network of the Cuban capital.

== Overview ==
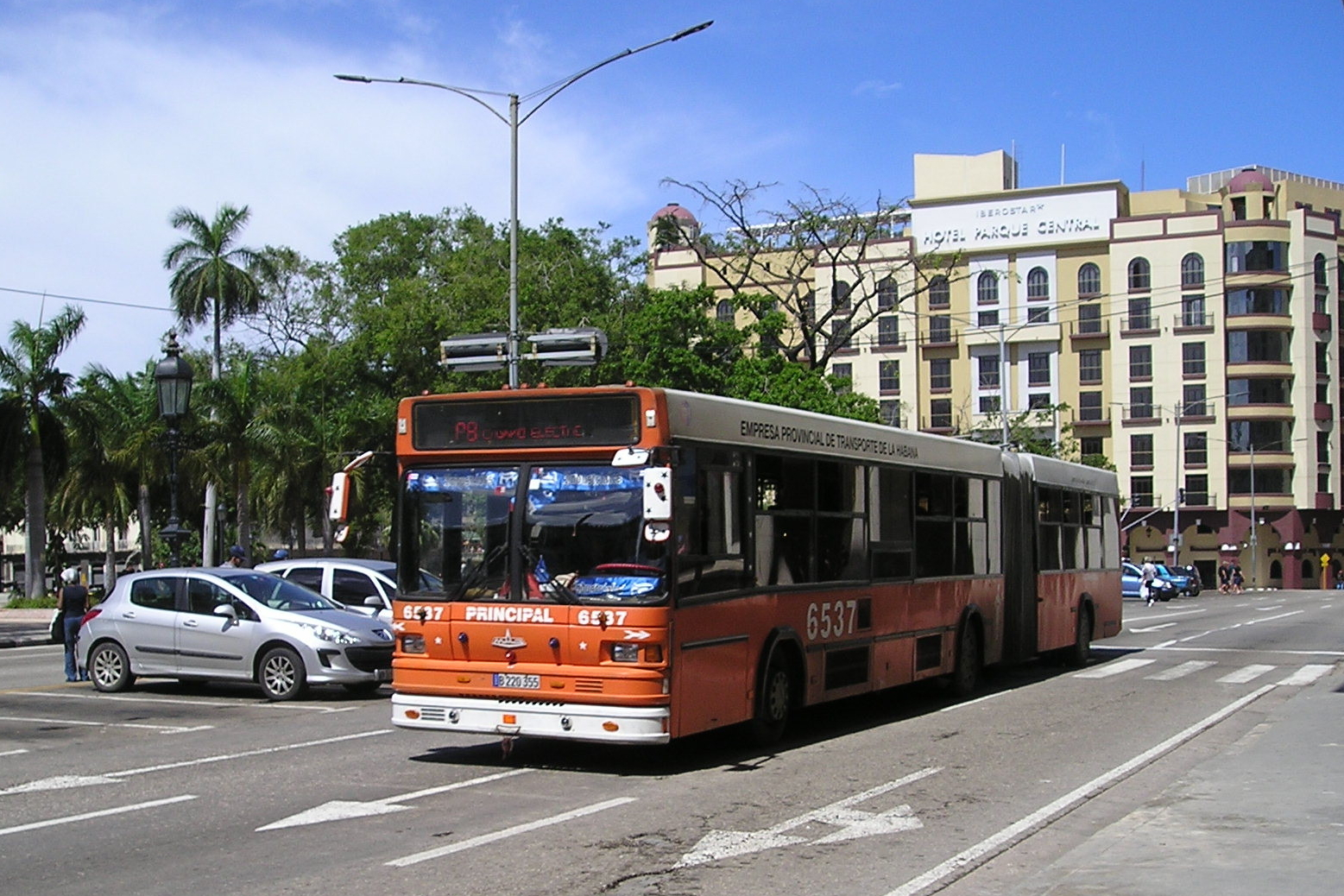
MAZ-105 bus

Formerly known as camellos or camelitos (Spanish for camels and little camels) for their two humps, the fleet of MetroBus, has been modernized, and now uses large modern articulated buses, such as the Chinese-made Yutong, Russian-made LiAZ, or MAZ of Belarus. The stops are usually 800–1,000 metres (2,600–3,300 ft) apart, with frequent buses in peak hours, about every 10 minutes. The network is linked to several suburban rail stations.

== Routes ==
The network consists of 17 main lines, all identified with the letter "P" preceding the number:

- P-1: La Rosita - Playa
- P-2: Alberro - Vedado
- P-3: Alamar - Túnel de Línea
- P-4: San Agustín - Playa - Terminal de Trenes
- P-5: San Agustín - Centro Habana - Terminal de Trenes
- P-6: Reparto Eléctrico - Vedado
- P-7: Alberro - Parque de la Fraternidad
- P-8: Reparto Eléctrico - Villa Panamericana
- P-9: La Palma - CUJAE
- P-10: Víbora - Playa
- P-11: Alamar - El Capitolio - Vedado
- P-12: Santiago de Las Vegas - Aeropuerto - Parque de la Fraternidad
- P-13: Santiago de Las Vegas - La Palma - Parque de la Fraternidad
- P-14: San Agustín - Parque de la Fraternidad
- P-15: Alamar - Guanabacoa - Vedado
- P-16: Santiago de Las Vegas - Vedado - Hospital Ameijeiras
- P-C: Hospital Naval - Playa (semi-circular coast-to-coast line)

== See also ==
- Havana Suburban Railway
