= National Railway Company of Cuba =

State railway operator in Cuba

Ferrocarriles de Cuba
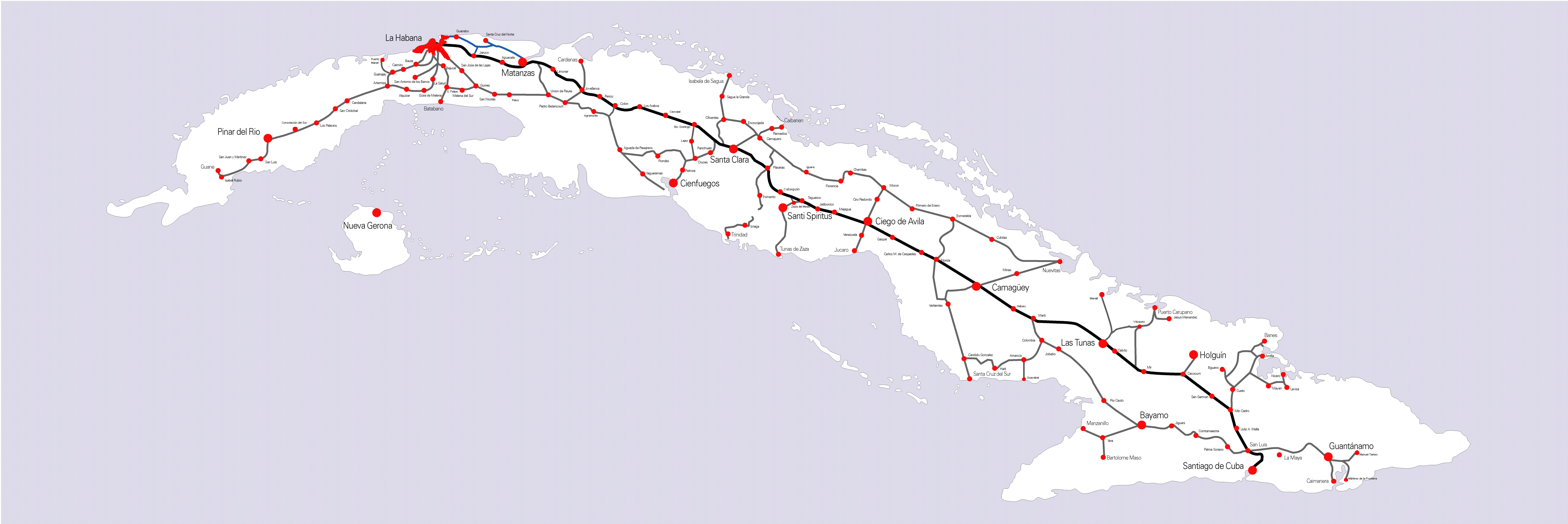
- Railway map of Cuba

Overview
- Headquarters: Havana
- Reporting mark: FFC (also: FC, FFCC)
- Locale: Cuba
- Dates of operation: 1924–

Technical
- Track gauge: 1,435 mm (4 ft 8 1/2 in) standard gauge
- Length: 1,055 km (656 mi)
- Track length: 4,556.25 km (2,831.12 mi)

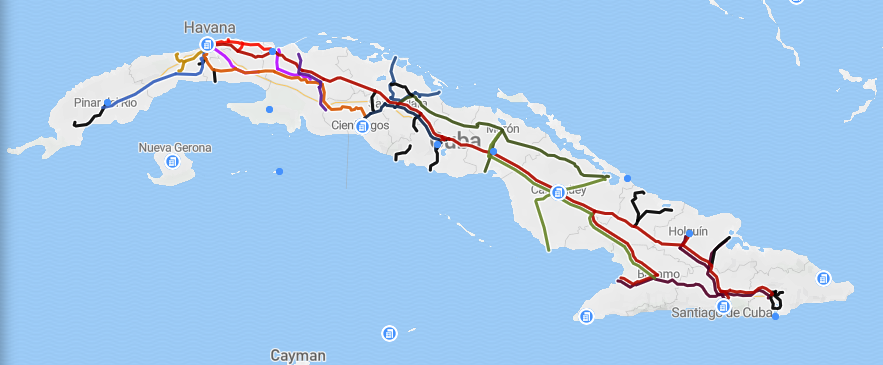
Passenger trains in Cuba

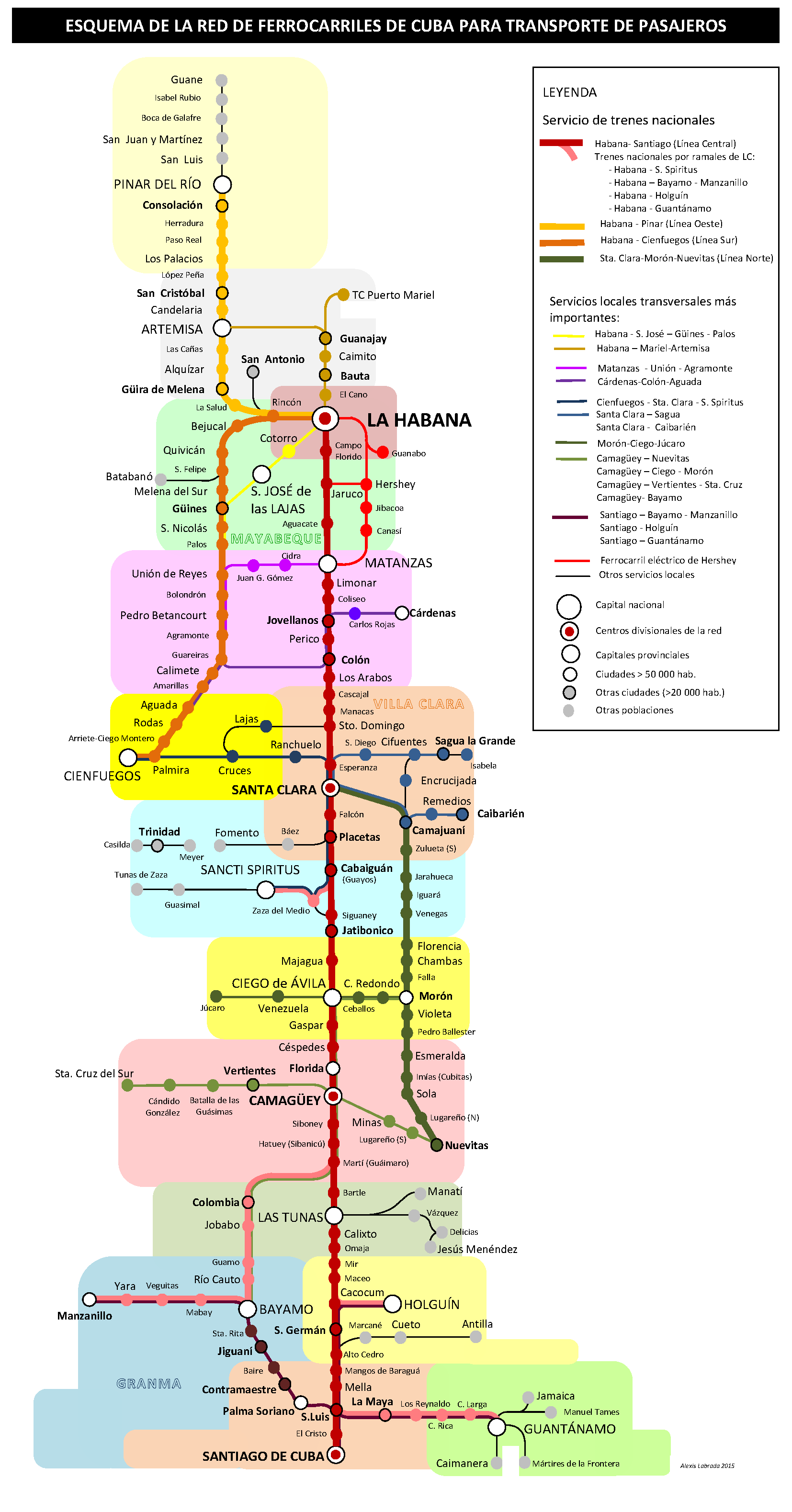
Cuban rail network for passenger transportation

Ferrocarriles de Cuba (FCC) or Ferrocarriles Nacionales de Cuba (English: National Railway Company of Cuba), provides passenger and freight services for Cuba. The National Railway Company of Cuba was formed in 1924 and expanded during Cuban nationalization, having since grown to span 4,556 kilometres (2,831.12 miles) of standard-gauge rail.

== Route network ==
Ferrocarriles de Cuba uses 1,435 mm (4 ft 8 1/2 in) standard gauge that extends from Guane, Pinar del Río province, in the westernmost part of the island up to Guantánamo bay in the eastern part. The 1,024 kilometers (636 mi) Central railway runs from Havana to Santiago de Cuba in the eastern region. Most of the 4,556.25 kilometers (2,831.12 mi) system is diesel-powered with 1,055 kilometers (656 mi) electrified. The flagship Train Number 1 travels between Havana and Baracoa. Other long-distance passenger services link Havana to Pinar del Río (western railway), Cienfuegos (South branch), Sancti Spíritus, Bayamo-Manzanillo and Guantánamo. The network connects the six first-level ports in Cuba: Havana, Mariel, Matanzas, Cienfuegos, Nuevitas and Santiago de Cuba, as well as all provincial capital cities.

The Hershey Electric Railway is an electrified railway from Havana to Matanzas that was built by the Hershey Company in order to transport workers and products after it had bought sugar plantations in 1916. It is a commuter service running in northern Havana and Matanzas provinces using some original equipment.

== History ==
=== Colonial Cuba ===
In 1836 Gaspar Betancourt Cisneros established a horse-drawn railway service called Ferrocarril de Camagüey a Nuevitas in Camagüey (Puerto Príncipe).

Cuba's railway history began on October 12, 1834, when the Queen Regent of Spain, Maria Christina of the Two Sicilies, approved the building of the first line. When the Compañía de Caminos de Hierro de la Habana opened the 27.5 kilometers (17.1 mi) line from Havana to Bejucal on November 19, 1837, the first steam railway line in Latin America. At that date Spain itself did not possess any railway lines.

The line from Havana was extended by 17 kilometers (11 mi) to reach Güines on November 19, 1839. By December 1843 the cities San Felipe and Batabanó were added to the rail network. Further extensions were opened in 1847, adding another 17 kilometers (11 mi), followed by 21 kilometers (13 mi) the next year and then 21 kilometers (13 mi) in 1849.

Havana had its first streetcar (Ferrocarril Urbano de la Habana) when its service commenced on February 3, 1859.

=== Pre-Revolutionary Cuba ===
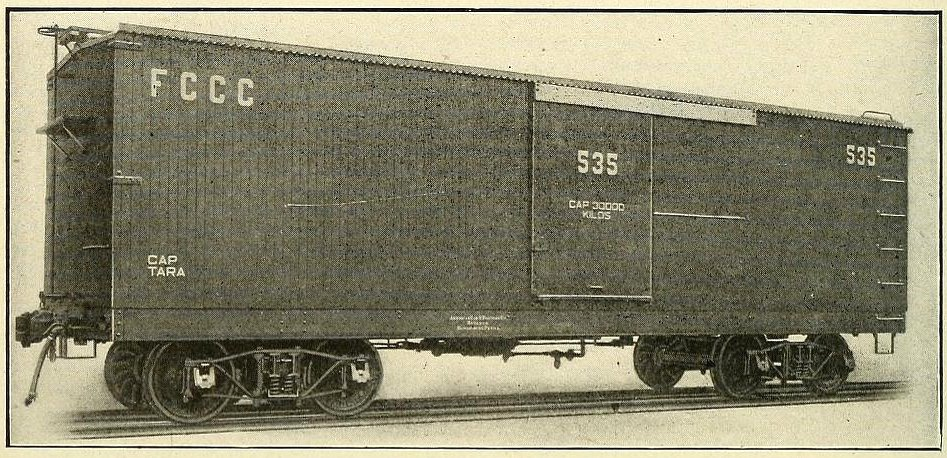
Boxcar used on Cuban Central Railway to transport sugar cane. ca 1913

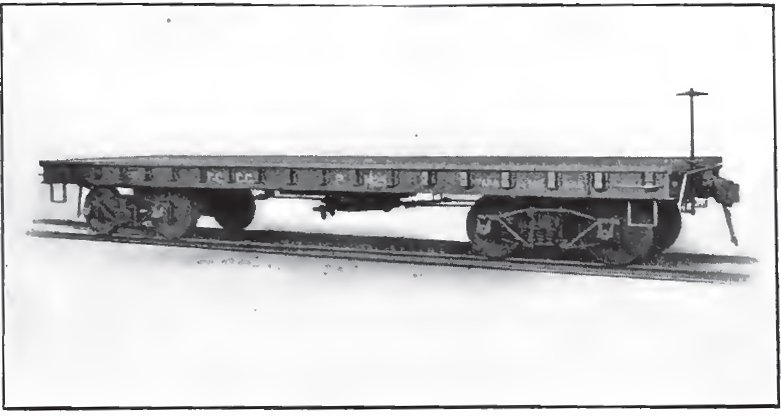
Flatcar used by the Cuban Central Railway for transportation of sugar plantations, circa 1913

American-born Canadian railway builder Sir William Cornelius Van Horne helped expand Cuba's railway network in the early 20th century. He was an investor in the Cuba Railroad Company (founded 1900).

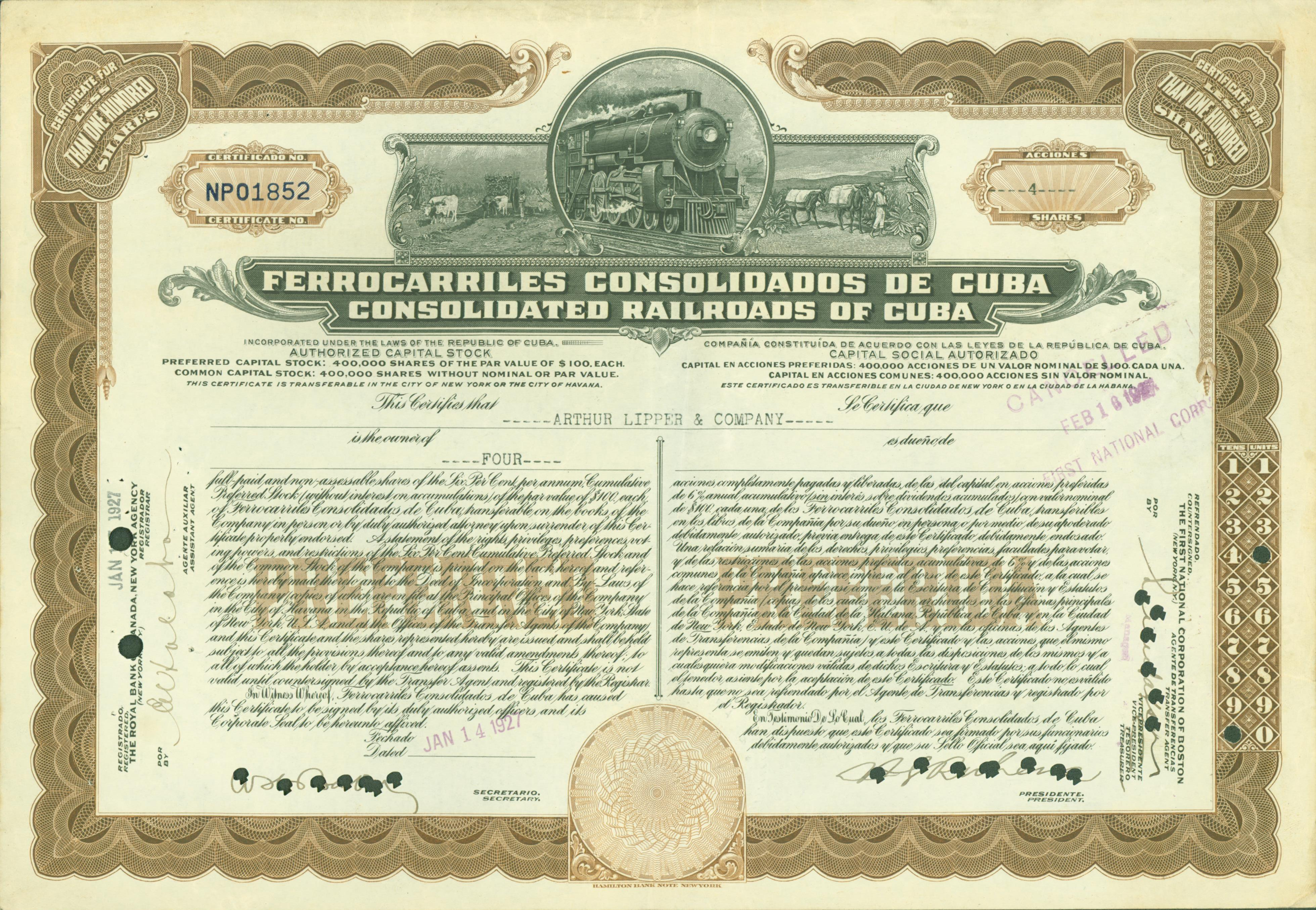
Share of the Ferrocarriles Consolidados de Cuba, issued 14 January 1927

In 1924 Ferrocarriles Consolidados de Cuba was created from a dispute between Ferrocarriles Consolidados de Cuba and Ferrocarriles de Cuba.

Other railway companies formed and merged in the 1920s:

- Ferrocarriles del Norte de Cuba 1916
- Ferrocarril Espirituano Tunas de Zaza
- Ferrocarril Guantánamo y Occidente

From 1940 to 1959, Cuba's railway system was modernized by the acquisition of train stock from Budd and Fiat. These trains provided medium-speed self-propelled (diesel) four-car service on the main line between Havana and Santiago de Cuba. Also after World War II, a large network of diesel intercity buses was created with four or five major carriers competing in the east–west corridor between Havana and the provinces to the east.

A few sugar factories switched over to diesel-electric locomotives to haul freight. In 1958, Cuba had more railway trackage per square mile than any other country.

=== Train ferry ===
- Prior to the revolution there was a train ferry between Miami and Havana.
- The West India Fruit and Steamship Company was one of a number of companies to provide such service.

=== Post-revolutionary Cuba ===
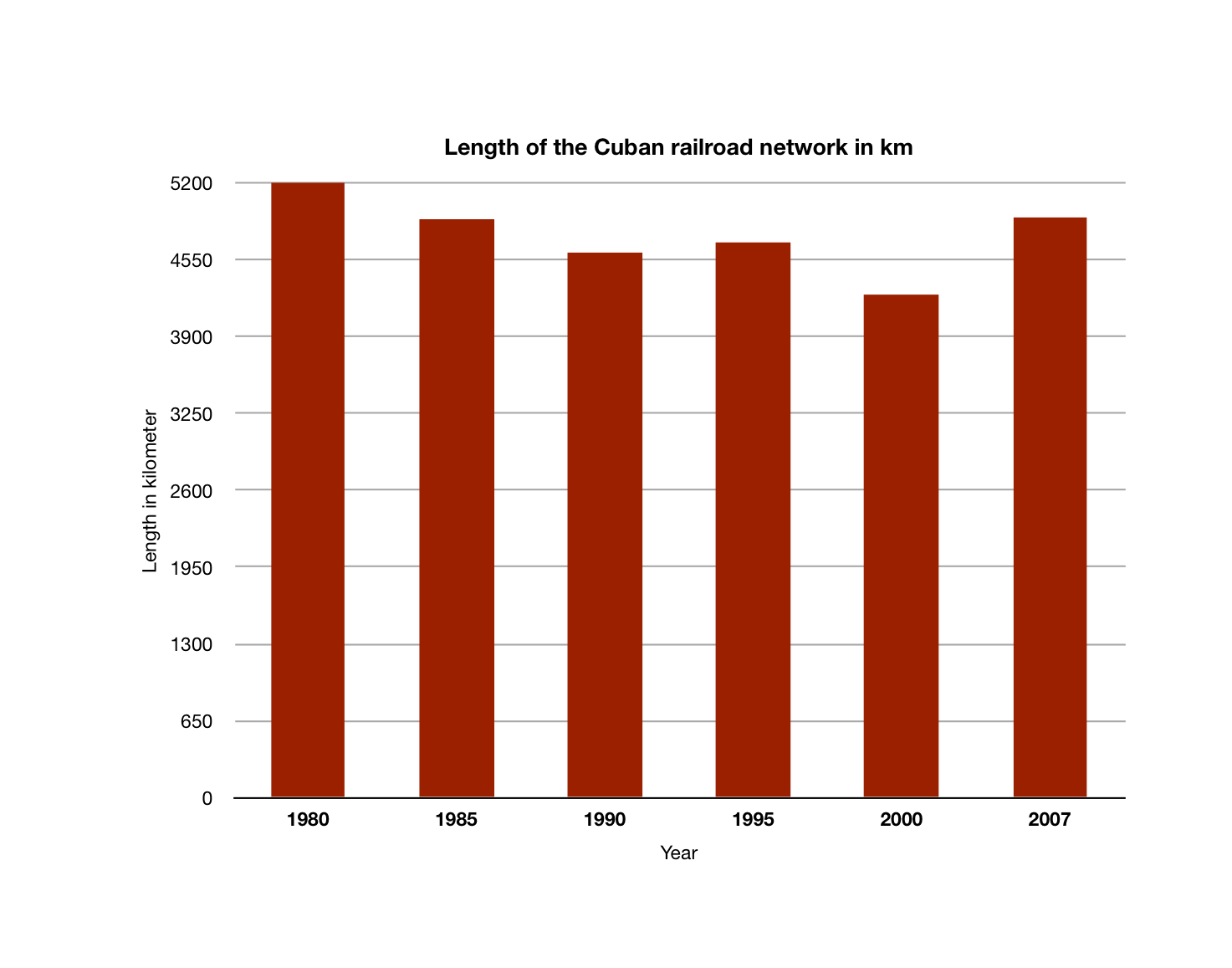
Diagram of Cuban rail network length in km (1980-2007)

The destruction of President Fulgencio Batista's so-called armoured train (it seems to have been an ordinary train carrying soldiers and weapons) by the revolutionaries in the Battle of Santa Clara in December 1958 was an important stepping stone in the Cuban Revolution.

After the revolution in 1959, the Ferrocarriles Nacionales de Cuba was created by nationalizing the private and public railway systems. MINAZ continued to operate a separate railway system, mainly to transport sugar products.

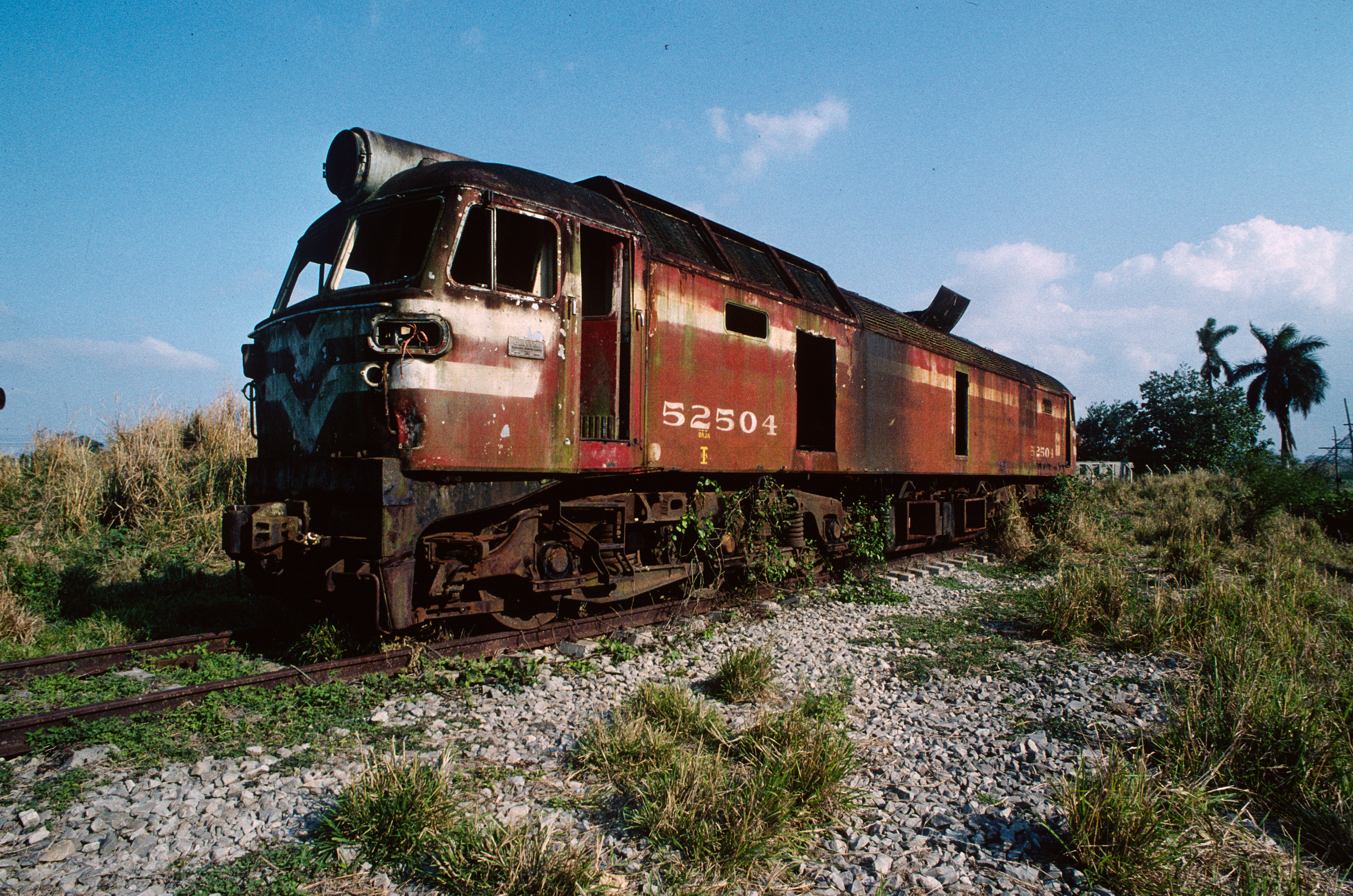
A Cuban Brush Type 4 locomotives in 1996

From 1963 to 1966, British Rail helped the national railway obtain newer locomotives which were based on the Class 47 at the time being built at Brush Traction in Loughborough, but the final assembly of the Cuban locomotives was performed in the Clayton assembly shop at International Combustion Derby operated by Clayton Equipment Company Hatton, Derbyshire. After the Cuban Missile Crisis, it became harder for Cuba to buy new railway equipment because of the United States embargo against Cuba. Some trains were shipped from third countries, British locomotives were shipped from Hull using Yugoslavian ships.

Cuba's purchase of new trains and parts from the Western Bloc, stopped from the late 1960s, was replaced through trade with the Eastern Bloc. The Soviet Union delivered 107 TE-114K locomotives between 1978 and 1984 but this trade link collapsed with the fall of the Soviet Union.

Cuba was able to obtain used trains and new locomotives, from friendly nations not affected by the embargo:

- 5 RSC18 locomotives were shipped from Canada
- 9 electrical motor coaches were shipped from Ferrocarrils de la Generalitat de Catalunya of Spain

Many of Cuba's trains are diesel and only a handful of steam locomotives remain for the sugar industry and tourism.

=== Recent developments ===
Starting in 2000, the Cuban railway network was improved by more second-hand equipment. Used vehicles came from Canada, China, Mexico, and Europe.

In 2002 used light rail-cars (BR771) were acquired from Deutsche Bahn in Germany.

In 2006 China became Cuba's major supplier of railway equipment. China Northern's February 7 Locomotive Works in Beijing began delivering 12 DF7G-C diesel locomotives. Follow-up orders for 40 and 60 more meant 112 locomotives were delivered between 2006 and 2010. China Railway also sold some of its retired cars.

On September 25, 2007, investors from the Venezuelan Bank for Socio-Economic Development (BANDES) reached an agreement with transportation officials in Cuba to invest US$100 million for infrastructure improvements and repairs to Cuba's rail network. The work was expected to help increase the average speed of trains on Cuba's railways from 40 to 100 kilometers per hour (25 to 62 mph). As part of the agreement, Cuban engineers will also work on similar projects on Venezuela's rail network.

In October 2007, the Cuban railways ordered 200 passenger and 550 freight cars from Iranian manufacturer Wagon Pars. They were never delivered because of UN sanctions against Iran, Cuba purchased coaches from China instead.

In May 2010 the Cuban government announced wide-ranging plans to repair the railway network, buy new rolling stock, and open four centers to train railway workers.

Improved Relations between Cuba and the United States has increased interest in Cuban rail travel. However, in 2017 a new US administration imposed more sanctions.

In 2016 Russian manufacturer Sinara Transport Machines signed a contract for 60 TGM8 km (ТГМ8КМ) and fifteen TGM4 km (ТГМ4КМ) diesel locomotives to be delivered in small lots by the end of 2021. The TGM8 km has been designed especially to work in the humid tropical climate conditions of Cuba. New spare parts for older Russian locomotives will be part of the order. Sinara will also begin rebuilding older locomotives.

In March 2017 Russian manufacturer RM Rail, who had just delivered 363 freight cars, signed a contract to deliver an additional 225. They also contracted for twenty-eight four-car passenger train-sets. In September Russian Railways subsidiary RZD International signed a contract for modernizing the system.

In March 2018 France's SNCF entered into an agreement to supply equipment, upgrade two shops to modern standards, and train people in both Cuba and France. Training will include repairing and renovating older equipment.

In August 2018 a decree-law updated and organized the railroad laws and regulation. From September 2018 foreign corporations can operate rail lines. A Safety Commission and other administration changes were made. Part of long-term infrastructure improvements include every track having a right-of-way of at least 15 meters for railroad use only. Any land that borders it must keep a fence in good condition.

As of January 2019, Sinara Transport Machines had delivered 43 diesel locomotives to Cuba as part of a contract to supply 75 locomotives by the end of 2021. A new contract for 23 LDE-2500 diesel locomotives was signed in January 2019. Prototype four-unit DMU rail-cars are being received.

In 2019, the Cuban railways received the first delivery of new Chinese-built coaches, and new services with these began in July 2019. Their delivery also coincided with the separation of passenger services to become a separate division of Cuban Railways: National Routes LLC (Rutas Nacionales), which operates the nationwide express and intercity passenger services on the network.

NRC's Mariel Division was split into a subsidiary company, Ferromar, in 2021.

== Rolling Stock ==
Model	Manufacturer	Country	Total	Notes	Image
G8	General Motors Electro-Motive Division	USA	51	Delivered 1954–1955. Similar to Indonesia BB 200 05 shown 1,100 kW (1,500 hp) B-B	
TEM2/4/15	Bryansk; Engineering Works	USSR	144	Delivered from 1964, seven locomotives of the last order for 25 Tem15 never arrived because they were still under construction at Bryansk's when the Soviet Union collapsed in 1991. Similar to #3157 shown 883 kW (1,200 hp) C-C	
DVM-9	Ganz–MÁVAG	Hungary	70	Delivered in 1969; Similar to DVM9 #VME 1-116 shown 750 kW (1,000 hp) 1A-A1	
M62K	Voroshilovgrad; Locomotive Factory	USSR	20	Imported in 1975; Similar to Soviet #0093 shown 1,260 kW (1,690 hp) C-C	
MX624	Montreal Locomotive Works	Canada	50	Imported in 1976; 1,800 kW (2,400 hp) C-C	
TE114K	Voroshilovgrad; Locomotive Factory	USSR	108	Delivered 1978-1984; 1,910 kW (2,600 hp) C-C	
GMD1	General Motors Electro-Motive Division	Canada	20	From Canadian National in 1999; 890 kW (1,200 hp) B-B	
C30-7	GE Transportation	USA	19	From Mexico; Similar to A.L.L. #9220 shown 2,200 kW (3,000 hp) C-C	
040-DE	Brissonneau et Lotz	France	42	Similar to SNCF BB #63123 shown 450 kW (600 hp) B-B	
DF7K-C	China Railway Beijing Group	China	5	Delivered in 2008; 1,000 kW (1,400 hp) B-B	
DF7G-C	CNR Beijing; Locomotive Works	China	152	Delivered 2005–2010; Similar to CR #5036 shown 1,840 kW (2,470 hp) C-C	
TGM4	Lyudinovsky; Locomotive Plant	Russia	15	Delivered from 2017. Similar to Russian #0957 shown 599 kW (814 hp) B-B	
TGM8	Lyudinovsky; Locomotive Plant	Russia	60	Delivered from 2017. 882 kW (1,200 hp) C-C	
RDC-1 DMU	Budd Company	USA	31	Delivered: CONSOLIDADOS-1951(11-RDC-1's & 5-RDC-2'S) OCCIDENTALES-1957(4-RDC-1'S & 6-RDC-3'S); Similar to LVRR #40 shown Passengers (RDC-1): 90 5 are ex Via Rail 6109 and 6120 (both formerly Canadian National with 6109 purchased from Chicago & Eastern Illinois Railroad) also Canadian Pacific 9049, 9055 and 9307 acquired from Canadian scrap dealer in 1998.	
DR VT 2.09 railbuses	Waggonbau Bautzen	GDR/Germany	57	771-772-791-792 series Passengers: 40-54. Purchased and delivered in the early 2000s.	
Tempo; Coaches	Hawker Siddeley Canada	Canada		From Mexico; Similar to Rio Grande car shown Passengers (coach): 80	
Mistral 69; Coaches		France		From SNCF	
NSB Y1 railcar	Fiat, Kalmar Verkstad	Norway		From Norwegian State Railways; Similar to NSB #1350 shown Passengers: 68-76	
VR Dm11 DMU	GEC-Alsthom	Spain	6	From Finnish State Railways; Passengers: 145	
Coaches	Wagon Pars	Iran	200	Delivered 2007-2009	
SV-10 DMU	Muromteplovoz.	Russia	300	Prototypes delivered from 2013; Passengers: 45-48	

Freight cars were mainly acquired from Eastern Bloc countries and the USSR, whereas passenger cars are from other countries that have diplomatic relations with Cuba (Mexico, Norway, Canada and France).

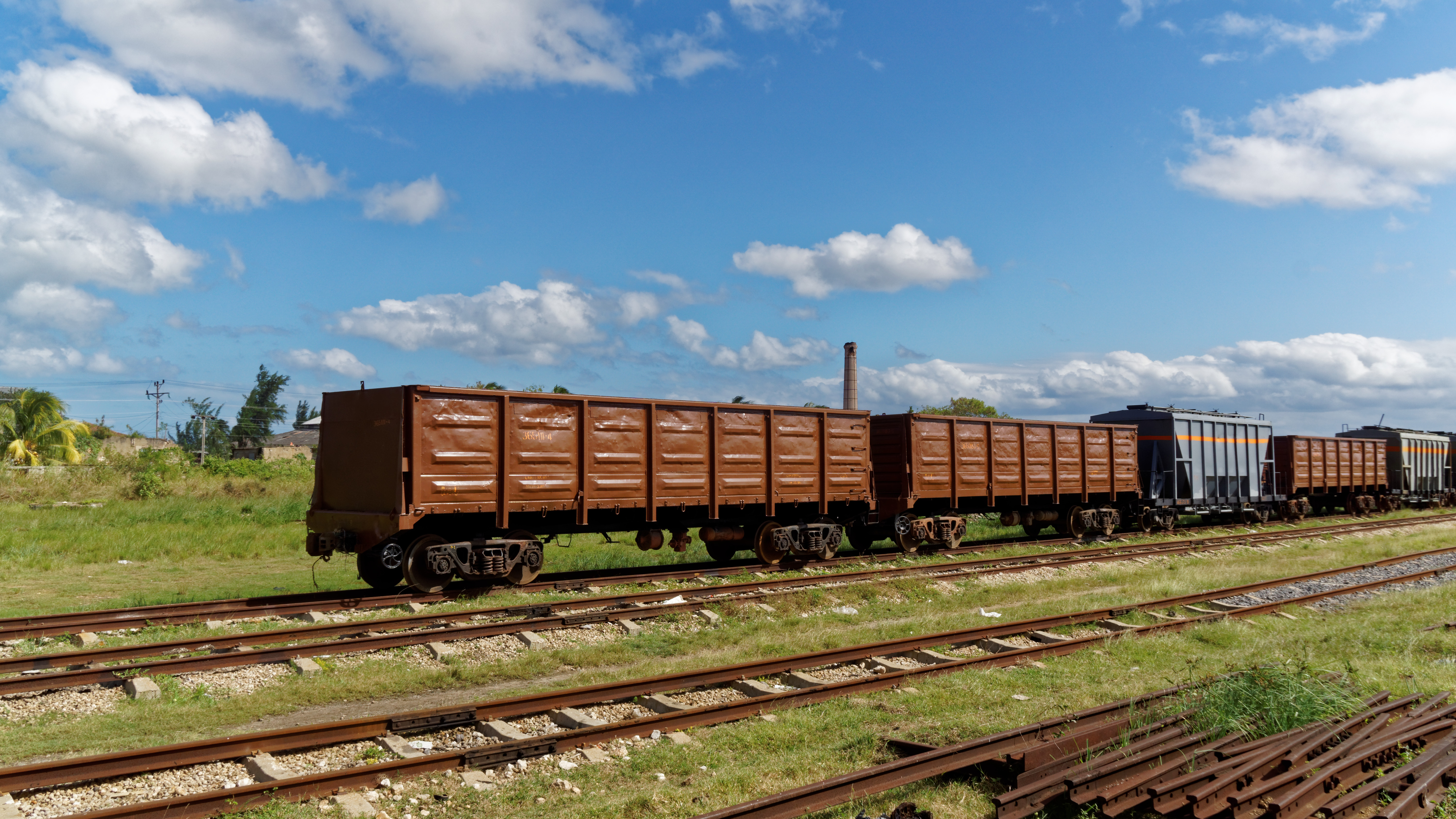
Gondolas and hopper cars of Ferrocarriles de Cuba, 2014

== See also ==
- Camagüey railway station
- Ferrocarril Recreacional (located in Parque Lenin) (Closed)
- Havana Central railway station
- Havana Suburban Railway
- Santa Clara railway station
- Santiago de Cuba railway station
- Tren Francés
- Transportation in Cuba
