= Havana Harbor =

Port of Havana, the capital of Cuba

Coordinates: 23°7′58.87″N 82°20′30.38″W

- Bahía de La Habana (Spanish)
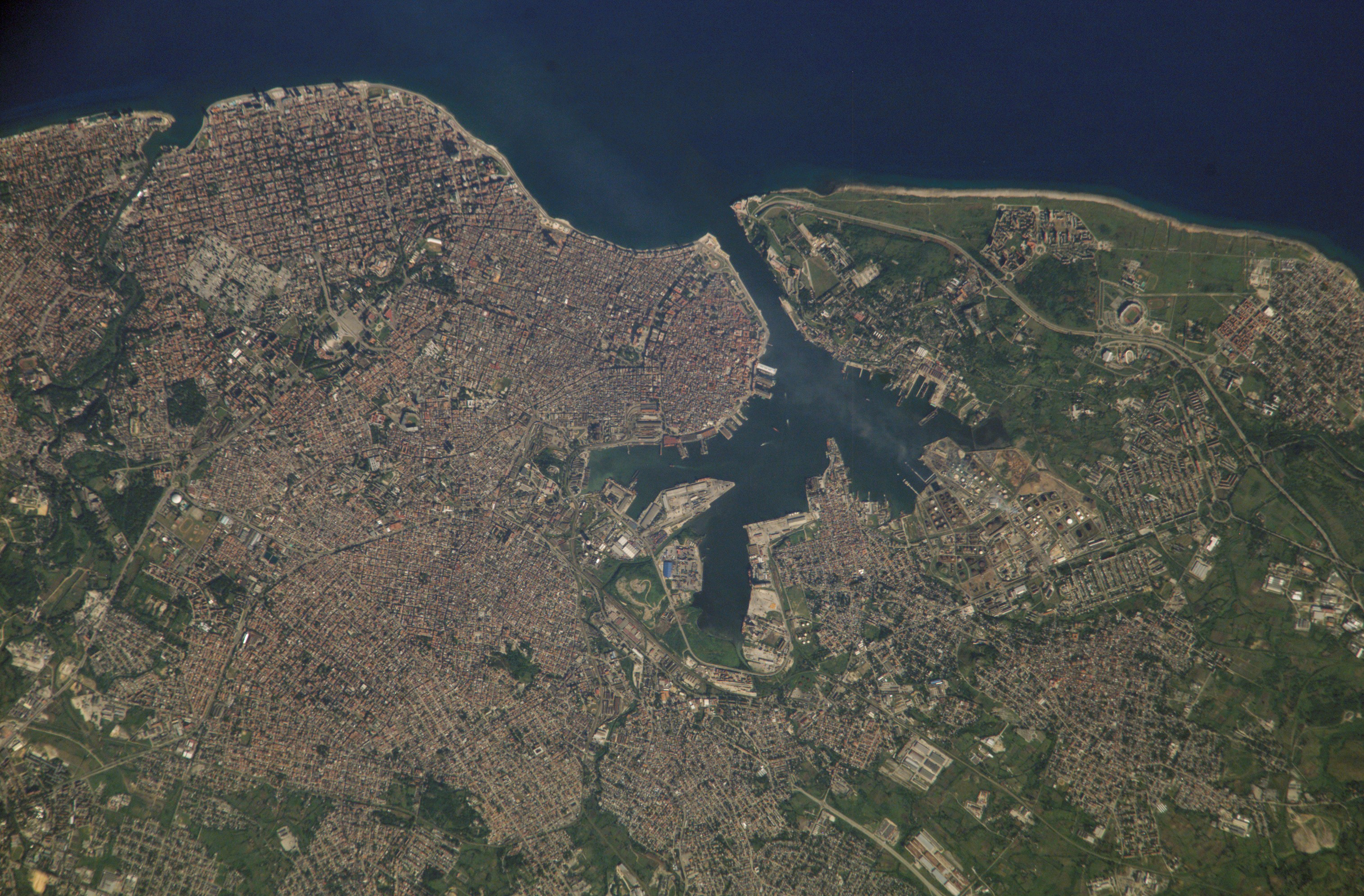
- Havana Bay and Harbor, surrounded by the City of Havana

- Location within Cuba
- Interactive map of Havana Harbor
- Type: Gulf
- Ocean/sea sources: Atlantic
- Surface area: 5.2 km^{2} (2.0 mi^{2})

Havana Harbor is the port of Havana, the capital of Cuba. It is the main port in Cuba. Other port cities in Cuba include Cienfuegos, Matanzas, Manzanillo, and Santiago de Cuba.

The harbor was created from the natural Havana Bay. It is entered through a narrow inlet and divides into three main harbors: Marimelena, Guasabacoa, and Atarés.

== History ==
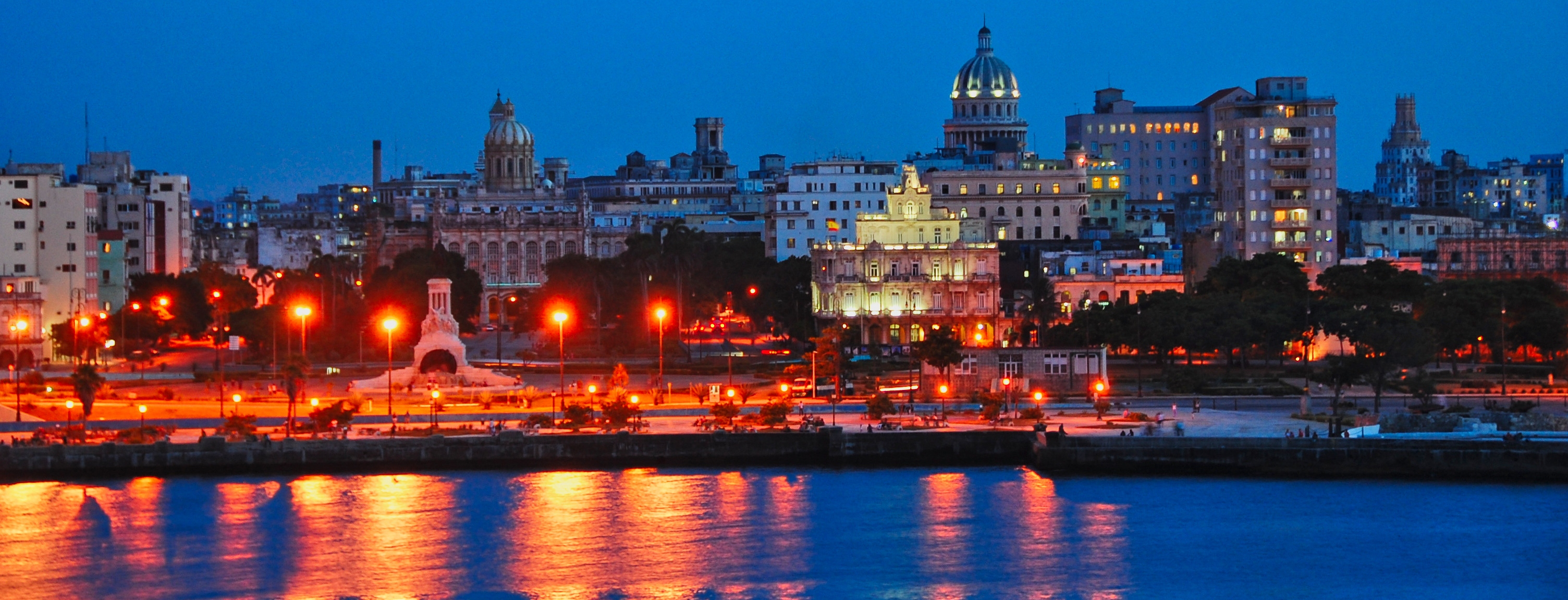
The waters of Havana Harbor, showing Old Havana at night.

It was fortified by the Spaniards in 1553 when they transferred the governor's residence to Havana from Santiago de Cuba on the eastern end of the island, thus making Havana the de facto capital. The importance of these fortifications was early recognized as English, French, and Dutch sea marauders attacked the city in the 16th century. Later fortifications included the Fortaleza de San Carlos de la Cabaña, known as La Cabaña or Fort of Saint Charles, built in the 18th-century on the elevated eastern side of the harbor entrance as the largest fortress complex in the Americas. The fort rises above the 200-foot (60 m) hilltop, beside Morro Castle. Castillo de la Real Fuerza and San Salvador de la Punta Fortress, both constructed in sixteenth century, sit on the western side of the harbor in Old Havana.

The Battle of Havana was a two-month siege of the harbor defenses by the British in 1762.

=== USS Maine ===
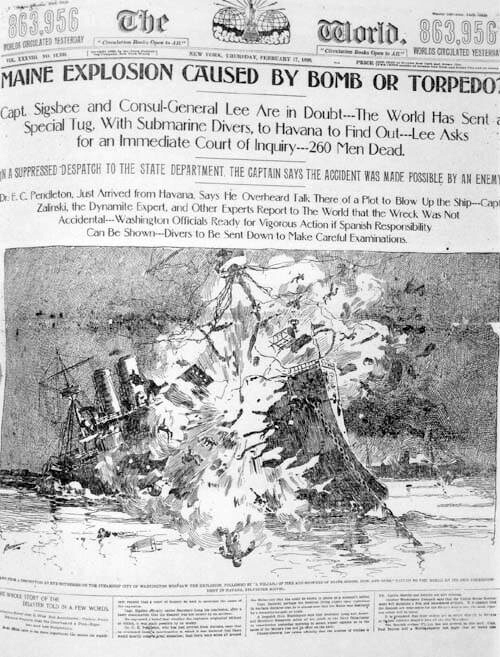
Maine explosion.

The sinking of the U.S. battleship Maine in Havana Harbor in 1898 was the immediate cause of the Spanish–American War.

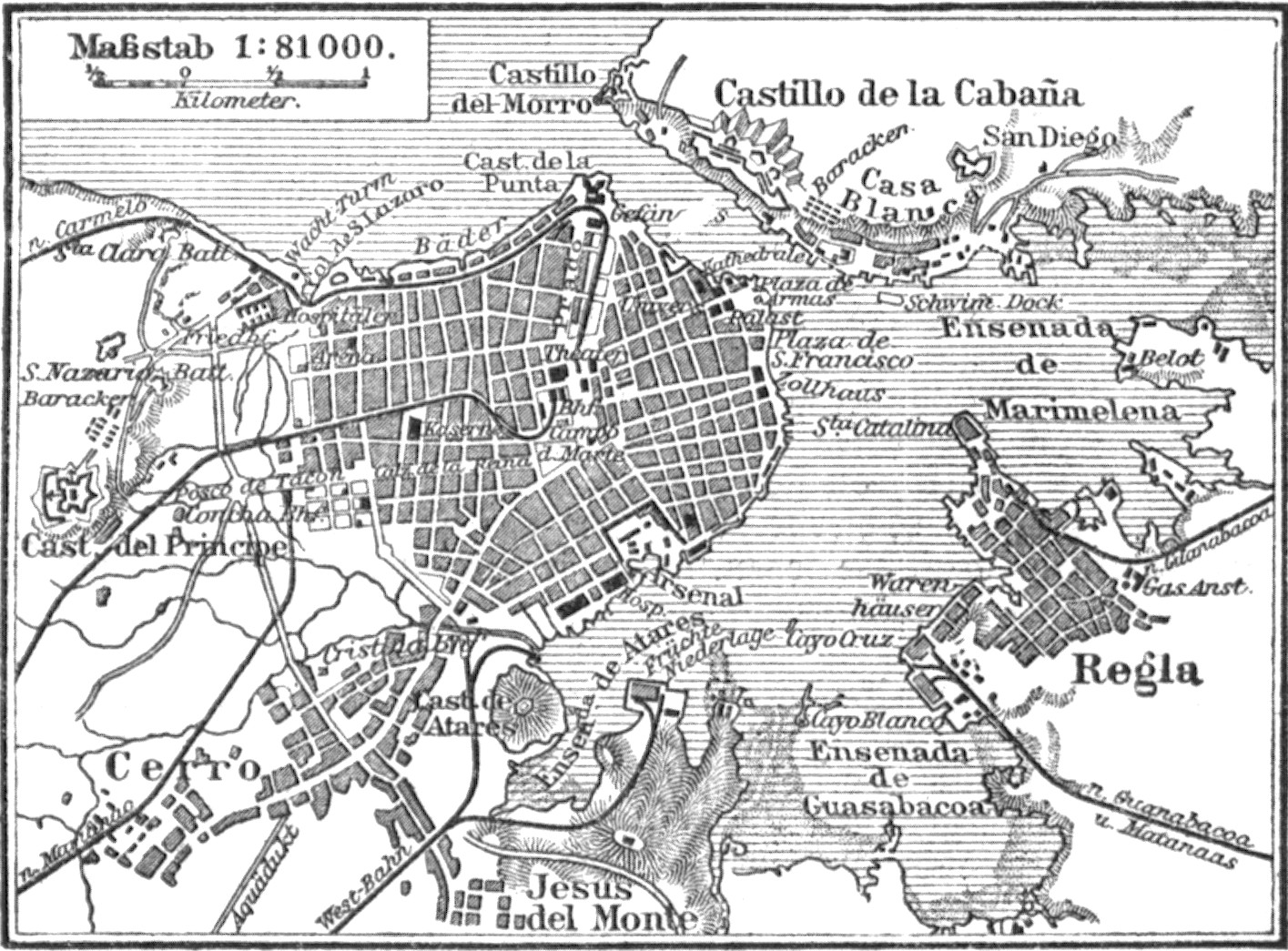
Map of Havana Harbor, 1890

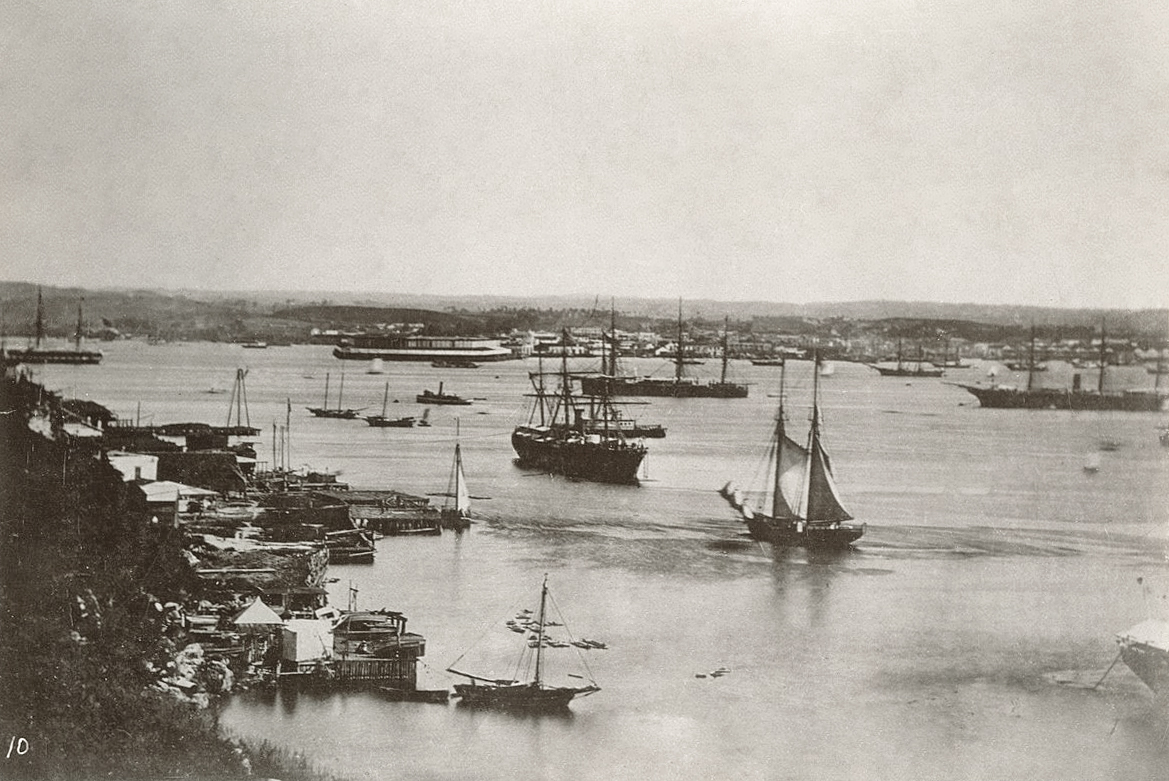
Havana Harbor - 1898

In January 1898 the USS Maine, the largest vessel to come out of an American shipyard, was dispatched to Cuba to protect US interests there. At the time more than 8,000 US citizens resided in the country, and their safety could not be assured in the state of affairs at that time. On February 15, 1898 the Maine exploded and sank in the harbor. It became a major rallying call for the Spanish–American War, and it caused the US to finally intercede on Cuba's behalf. In 1912 the wreck was removed from the harbor as it was posing a hazard to navigation. It was sunk in deep water in the Gulf of Mexico with proper military ceremonies.

=== La Coubre ===
On March 4, 1960, the harbor was the scene of a deadly explosion when the French freighter La Coubre, carrying 76 tons of Belgian munitions, was being unloaded. The cause of the blast, which killed an estimated 100 people, is often attributed to the CIA who wished to overthrow the new government of Fidel Castro.

=== First recorded shark attack ===
Havana Harbor has the distinction of having the first recorded shark attack, which occurred in 1749 to British sailor Brook Watson.

== Facilities ==
=== Ensenada de Marimelena ===
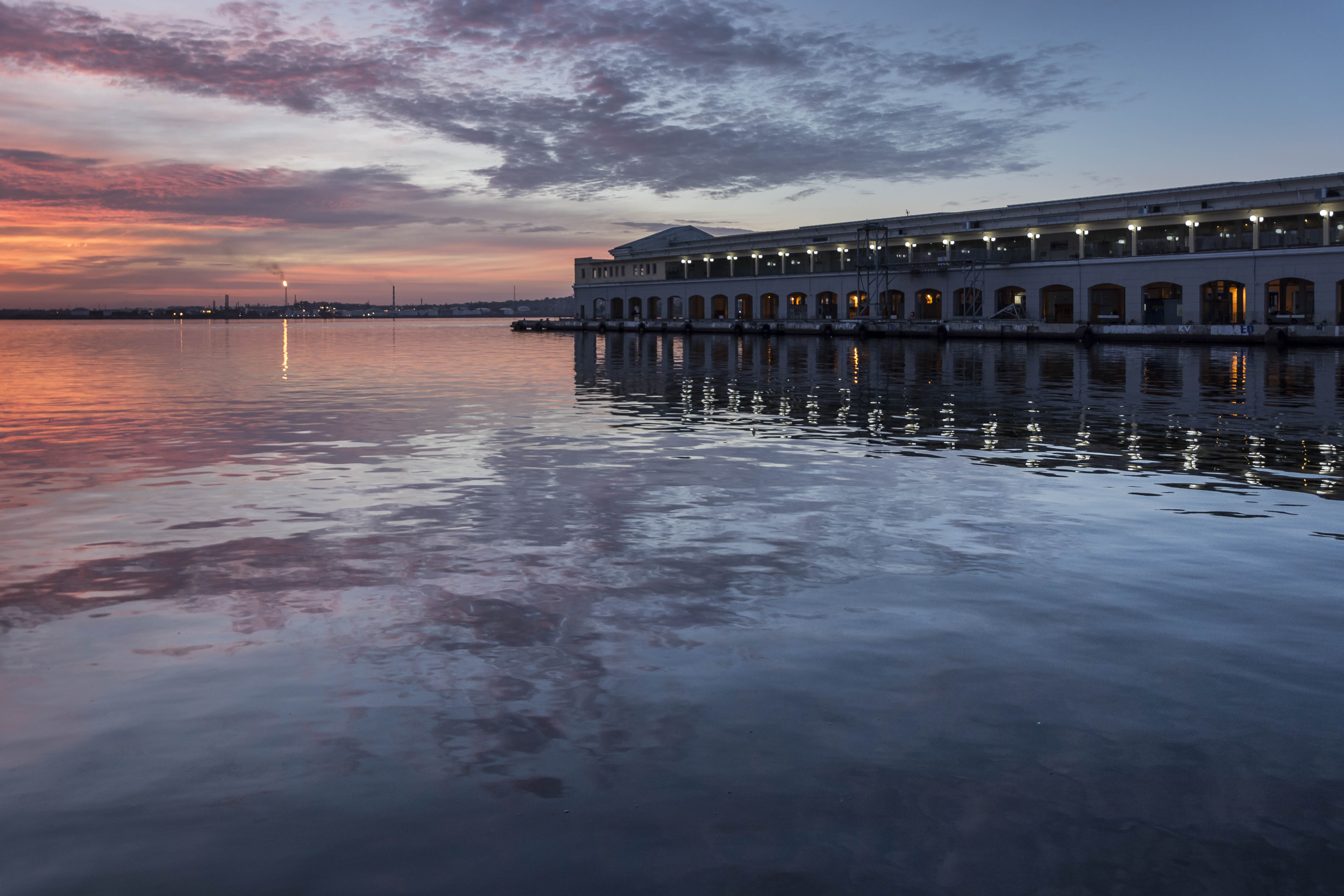
Port of Havana

The town or Regla on Ensenada de Marimelena is a commercial and industrial suburb with the Galainela shipyard, ENA drydock, until recently operated as a joint venture with Curacao CDM, and the Navy's shipyard at Casablanca. Other docks include the Havana Container Terminal (TCH), the Ñico Lopez oil refinery, formerly a Shell refinery; and flour and wheat mills and aviation fuel depots.

=== Ensenada de Guasabacoa ===
Least developed of the harbor arms.

=== Ensenada de Atarés ===
The harbor in Old Havana offers cruise ship terminals, shipping and vessel repair services operated by Asticar.

== Environmental conditions ==
As a harbor almost completely surrounded by shipping and industrial activities, the waters of the bay suffer from environmental stress. This in turn affects the water quality of the Caribbean Sea into which it flows. Water entering the bay as river flows or effluent from industrial processes has a residence in the harbor of 8 days, on average. It receives approximately 48,000 m3 of waste water per day, which carries about 4,800 kg of nitrogen and 1,200 kg of phosphorus, which results in elevated concentrations of nutrients. Havana Bay is strongly affected by sewage dumping, and it also receives suspended solids, hydrocarbons, heavy metals and pollutants from agriculture, industry and port activities. The leading sources of pollution in the bay have been identified as the Luyano River which contains organic material, nutrients, sewage, solid waste, the Regla oil refinery, fish hatcheries, and port activities. The high concentration of hydrocarbons, heavy metals and other pollutants is of concern as the harbor is an important fishing port.

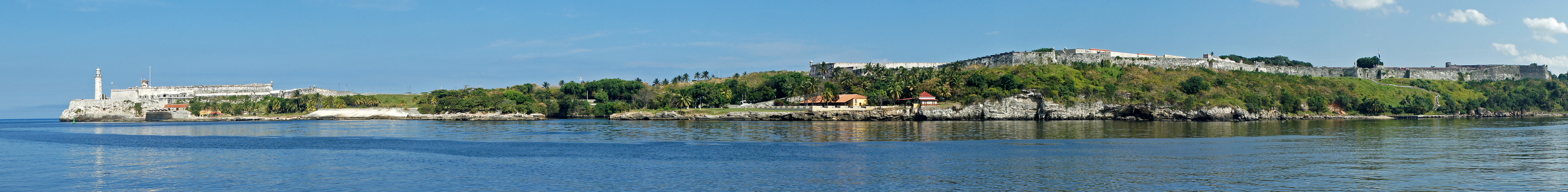
Panoramic view of the right side of the entrance canal to Havana Harbor. At the left, the Castillo de los Tres Reyes del Morro, and at the right, the Fortaleza de San Carlos de la Cabaña.
