= Hershey Electric Railway =

Interurban railway in Cuba

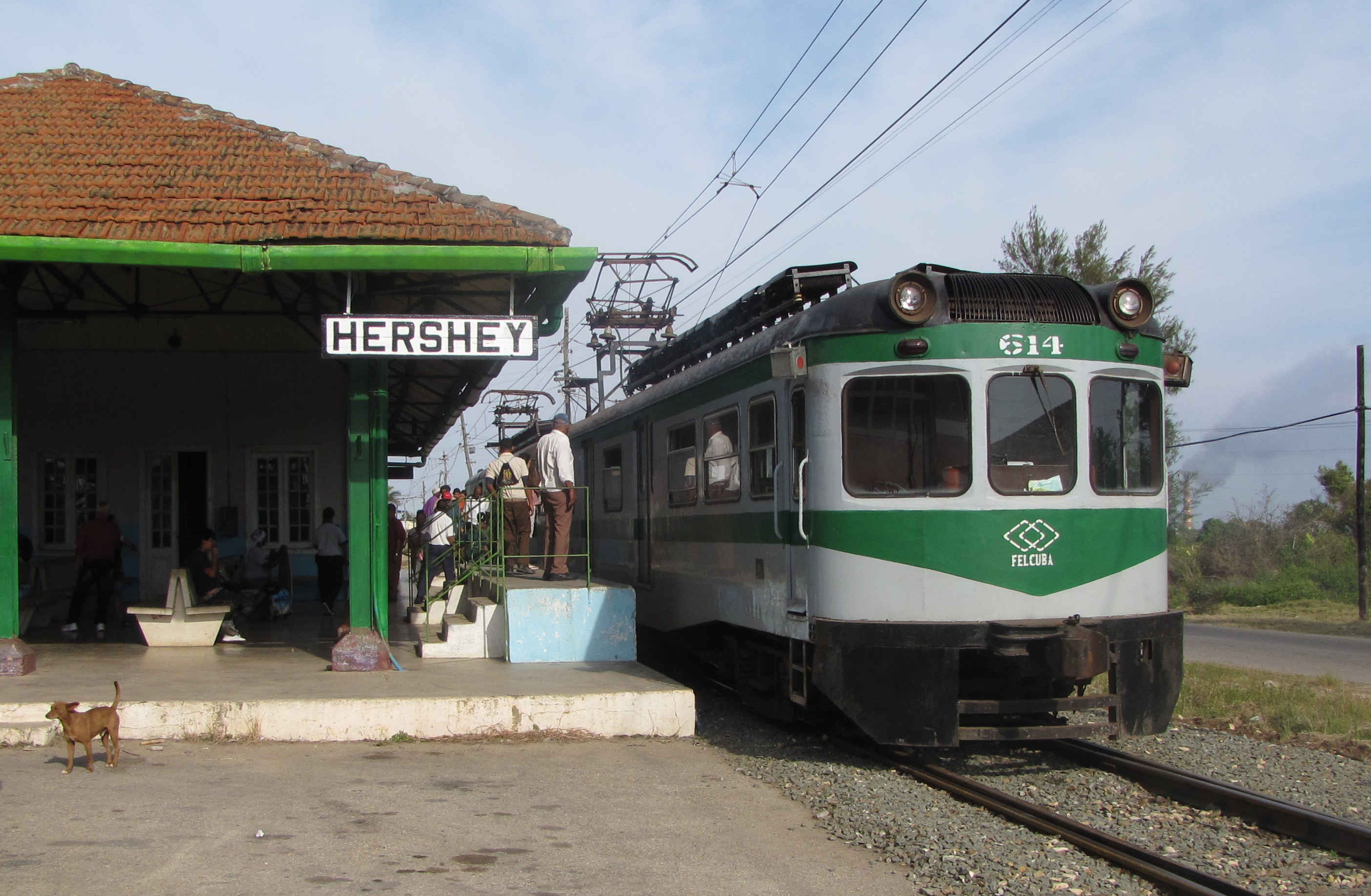

Overview
- Status: Operational
- Owner: Ferrocarriles de Cuba
- Locale: Havana and Matanzas Provinces, Cuba
- Termini: Havana Casablanca railway station 23.1423°N 82.3448°W; Matanzas Versalles railway station 23.0521°N 81.5743°W

Service
- Type: Commuter rail
- Operator(s): Ferrocarriles de Cuba
- Depot(s): Hershey railway station
- Rolling stock: Brill Interurban

History
- Opened: 1917 (Hershey railway station to Havana Casablanca railway station); 1918 (Hershey railway station to Matanzas Versalles railway station)

Technical
- Number of tracks: Single
- Track gauge: 1,435 mm (4 ft 8 1/2 in) standard gauge
- Electrification: Overhead line, 1,200 V DC

The Hershey Electric Railway, also known as the Hershey Railway, is a standard-gauge electric interurban railway that runs from Casablanca, Havana, to the city of Matanzas, approximately 92 kilometres (57 mi) to the east. There are a number of intermediate halts and a station and depot at the town of Camilo Cienfuegos, better known by its pre-revolutionary name of Hershey. The railway is the only surviving electric line in Cuba. The railway was built by The Hershey Company to transport sugar to the port of Havana. The original electric interurban cars were bought from the JG Brill Company, but these were replaced by 60-year old cars from the Ferrocarrils de la Generalitat de Catalunya in the 1990s.

== Overview ==
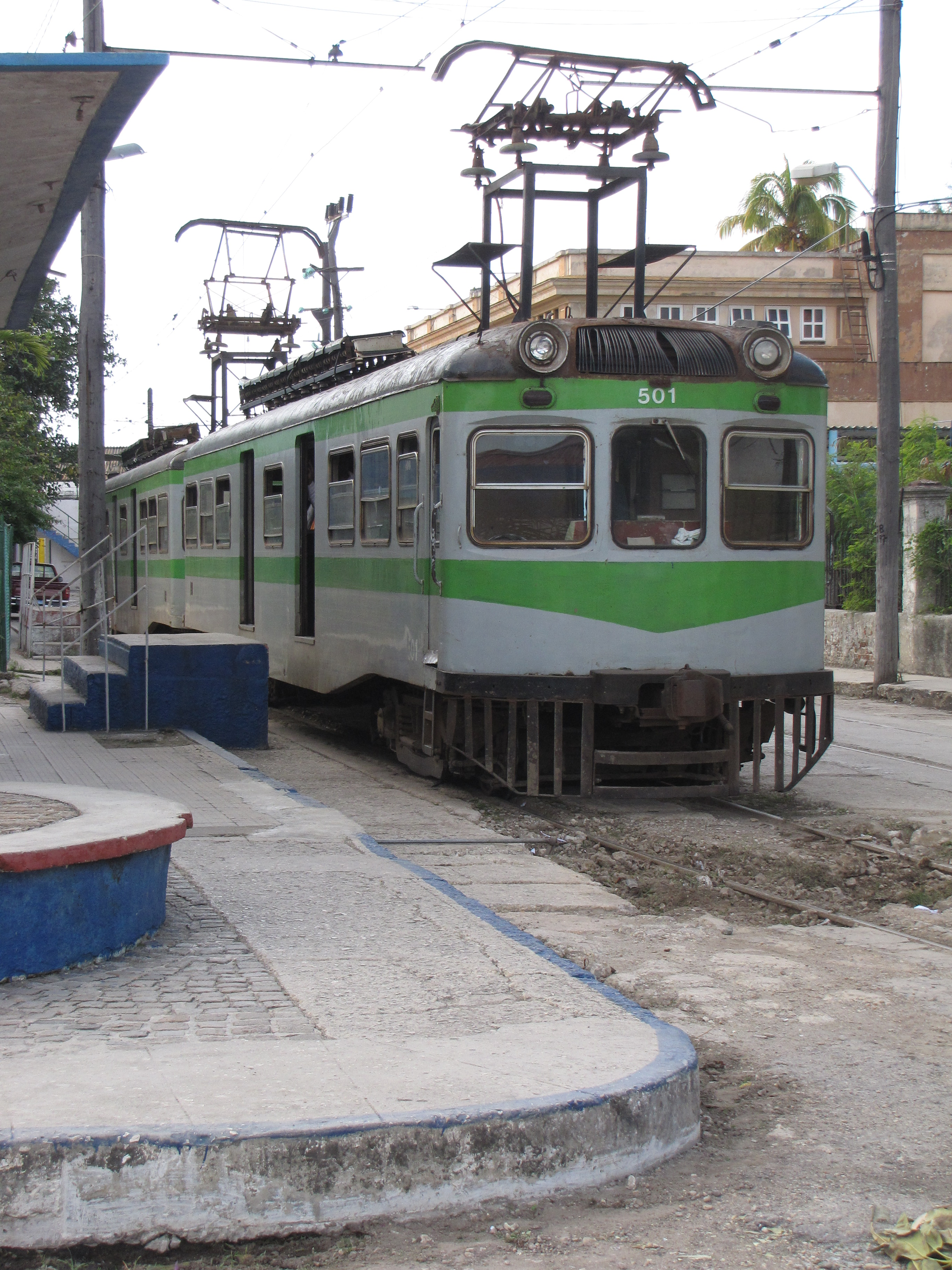
Train waiting to depart at Havana Casablanca station

There are usually three trains per day, each way between Havana Casablanca and Matanzas, meeting at Hershey Station, the midpoint. The early morning and later afternoon trains allow commuters to go to work at the end-points, the mid-day provides supplementary service. The end-to-end time is approximately 3 1/2 hours. The service can be irregular and journeys may be truncated without prior notice. The main stops are at Guanabo, Hershey, San Mateo, Jibaco, Canasi, San Antonio and Matanzas, which have modest station buildings. There are also other stops with small platforms and there can be numerous intermediate halts at road crossings serviced on demand. There are four branches from the main line in current use, running to Playas del Este, Jaruco, Bainoa and Santa Cruz del Norte. There is local passenger service from Calle 7 Station in Hershey (near the maintenance facility) to San Antonio de Rio Blanco and Jaruco. There may also still be local passenger service from Hershey Station to Caraballo on the Bainoa branch. These are rarely used since 2000, but in the summer months, diesel hauled excursion trains run from Havana's La Coubre station to Playas del Este, a popular destination for city dwellers. In March 2012 there were 4 daily trains between Caraballo, Hershey and Playas del Este, having to reverse at Guanabo Jct. Other branches exist but have not been used in recent years. The branch to the Havana Club dark rum factory in Santa Cruz del Norte is no longer electrified and tank cars of molasses are delivered by diesel locomotives running out of Matanzas.

The maintenance facility is in Hershey, near the Callé 7 platforms, and the remains of the Hershey sugar refinery. Apparently one or more Brill cars are stored there for occasional tourist use, along with a GE steeple cab locomotive and a tower car to maintain the overhead catenary lines. Line voltage is 1200 volts DC. Ties are concrete, rails are jointed (not continuous/welded) and power poles wooden, usually on the south side. To minimize construction costs, the scenic roadbed tends to follow the contours of the land, with many curves to minimize grades. The line serves communities and regions roughly midway between the Carretera Central and coastal Via Blanca highways, between Havana and Matanzas. These areas would otherwise have no public transportation and poor road service.

When the Hershey line was constructed circa 1916, largely to support the Hershey sugar refinery, the main railway operator in Havana province, United Railways, refused to allow the Hershey train access to its tracks so a new terminus was built at Casablanca, which is across the harbour from Habana Vieja, connected by a ferry service.

After Hurricane Irma in September 2017, the railway suspended all its services until further notice. Only since spring 2018 have some trains been running again on the Hershey (Camilo Cienfuegos) - Jaruco branch. Due to increased tourism numbers, other Hershey lines are about to reopen. A reactivation study published in 2024 estimated that regular connections every two hours could be worthwhile and that the vehicle technology would allow for this.

== See also ==
- Havana Suburban Railway
- Tramway in Havana
- List of town tramway systems in North America
