= Regla =

- Municipality of Havana
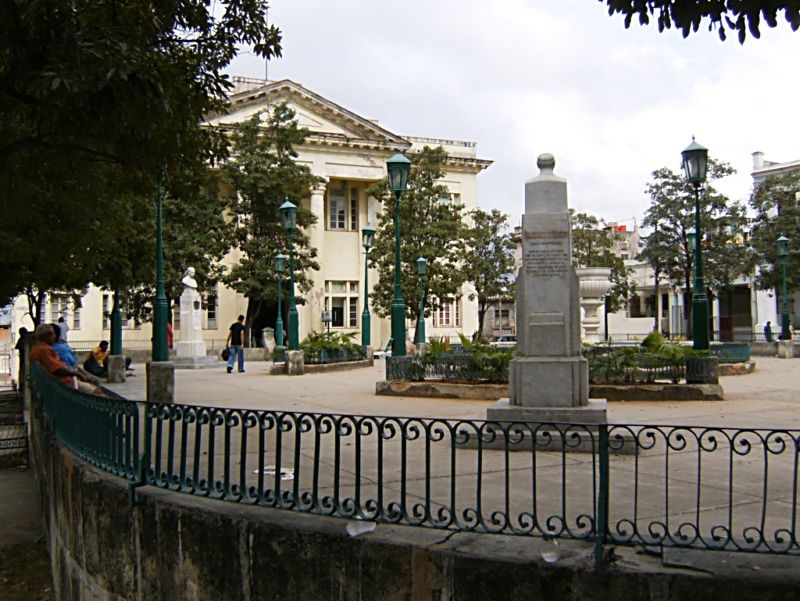
- Guaicanamar Park

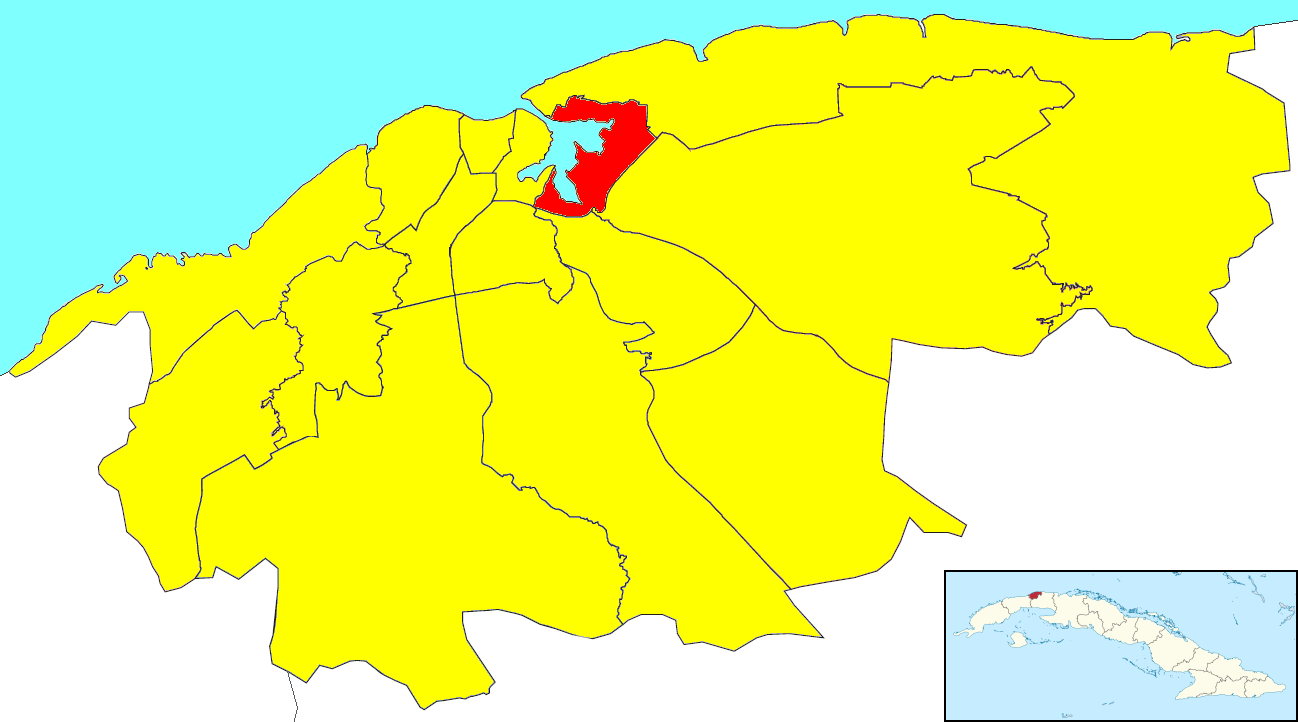
- Location of Regla in Havana

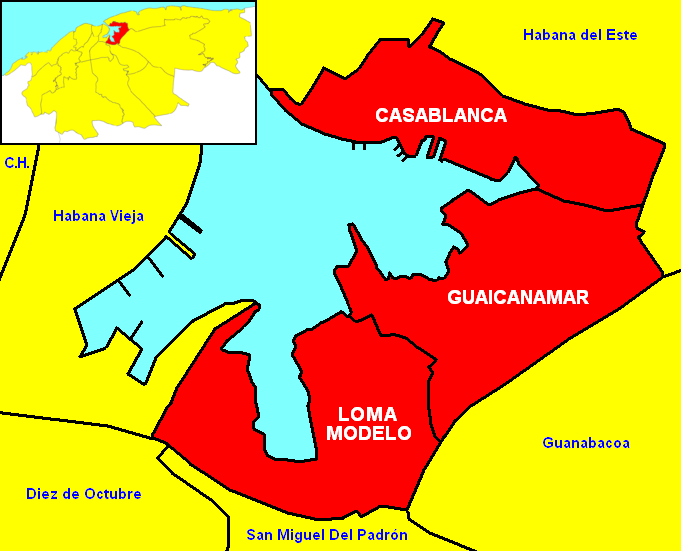
- Map of the wards composing Regla
- Coordinates: 23°07′54″N 82°20′11″W
- Country: Cuba
- Province: Ciudad de La Habana
- Wards (Consejos Populares): Casablanca, Guaicanimar, Loma Modelo

Government
  - President: Yunaythe López Cantero

Area
  - Total: 9.2 km^{2} (3.6 sq mi)

Population (2022)
  - Total: 44,185
  - Density: 4,800/km^{2} (12,000/sq mi)
- Time zone: UTC-5 (EST)
- Area code: +53-7

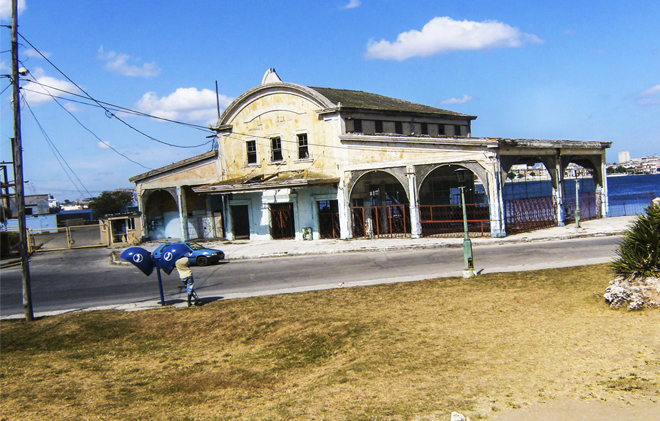
Boat dock in Regla

Regla (Spanish pronunciation: [ˈreɣla]) is one of the 15 municipalities or boroughs (municipios in Spanish) in the city of Havana, Cuba. It comprises the town of Regla, located at the bottom of Havana Bay in a former aborigine settlement named Guaicanamar, Loma Modelo in a peninsula dividing Marimelena from Guasabacoa inlets, and the village of Casablanca located at the entry of the Havana Bay.

== Overview ==
The town is a commercial and industrial suburb with shipyards. The Galainela shipyard and the ENA drydock until recently operated as a joint venture with Curaçao CDM and the Navy's shipyard at Casablanca, docks including the TCH (Havana Container Terminal), the Ñico Lopez refinery, formerly an Esso (EXXON) Refinery popularly known as Belot Refinery due to the location, and a Shell (Shell Oil Company) Refinery built side by side with Belot; flour and wheat mills and aviation fuel depots.

== History ==
It is known for its rich colonial history, being the home town of Chacón, Guaracheros de Regla and the traditional Virgen de Regla Santería celebrations. It formed during the colonial period around the hermitage of Nuestra Señora de Regla (est. 1690) and was officially founded in 1687 (1765). In 1755 the population of Regla was 164; 789 in 1778; and 2,218 in 1810.

Regla has a strong patriotic tradition being home to several patriots and personalities, among them Eduardo Facciolo, executed by the colonial Spanish government for conspiring for Cuban independence, and Miguel Coyula, who reached the rank of Lieutenant Colonel of the Cuban Liberation Army (Mambi Army) in its fight against colonial Spain.

It is an historic known fact the first speech with political pro-independence overtones given by National Apostle José Martí was delivered in the Lyceum of Regla.

During the struggle against dictator Fulgencio Batista, due to the strong opposition to Batista, the town was described as "sierra chiquita" (little mountain range) in allusion to the rebels in the Sierra Maestra range. The most conspicuous public action against Batista in town was led by Juan Alborna Salado, at the time 21 years old, head of the clandestine militias of the Movimiento 26 de Julio in town, in March 1958, when the local police killed another young man of Regla named Gilberto Monzon. The young men Leonardo Lopez, Filiberto Torres, Luis Lorenzo Gonzalez, Marcos Gonzalez, Manuel Lopez Guenaga, Elio Serrano, German Roche, Pedro Valdes, Jose Luis Cabrera and others seconded him. All of them belonged to the Movimiento 26 de Julio.

Thousands of people took to the streets, with the burial of the young men being a centerpoint of a riot, and a crowd escorted the funerary car up to the cemetery at which Alborna and Luis Lorenzo Gonzalez spoke. Motorized police reinforcements took Regla and surrounded the cemetery and shot at close range. The police took prisoners, and many escaped, including Juan Alborna, but with a hand injury that was cured by his girlfriend Noemi Vidal. It was practically a popular uprising. But in 1960 Juan Alborna Salado became dissident.

== Demographics ==
In 2022, the municipality of Regla had a population of 44,185. With an area of 9 km^{2} (3.5 sq mi), it had a population density of 4,800/km^{2} (12,000/sq mi).

Regla is divided into Barrios or Colonias, including Reparto Modelo, La Colonia, La Loma and La Colina Lenin. It is also divided into three Consejos Populares (People's Council), the grassroots local government form in Cuba, namely Guaicanamar, comprising Regla downtown; Loma-Modelo, comprising Regla suburbs; and Casablanca, comprising the village of the same name and its surrounding area.

== Twin towns ==
- Corsico, Italy, since 2003
- (United States) Richmond, California, USA
- Almada, Portugal, since 2004

== See also ==
- Jose Canseco
- List of cities in Cuba
- Municipalities of Cuba
