= Casablanca, Havana =

Ward of Havana, Cuba

Casablanca
- Ward of Havana
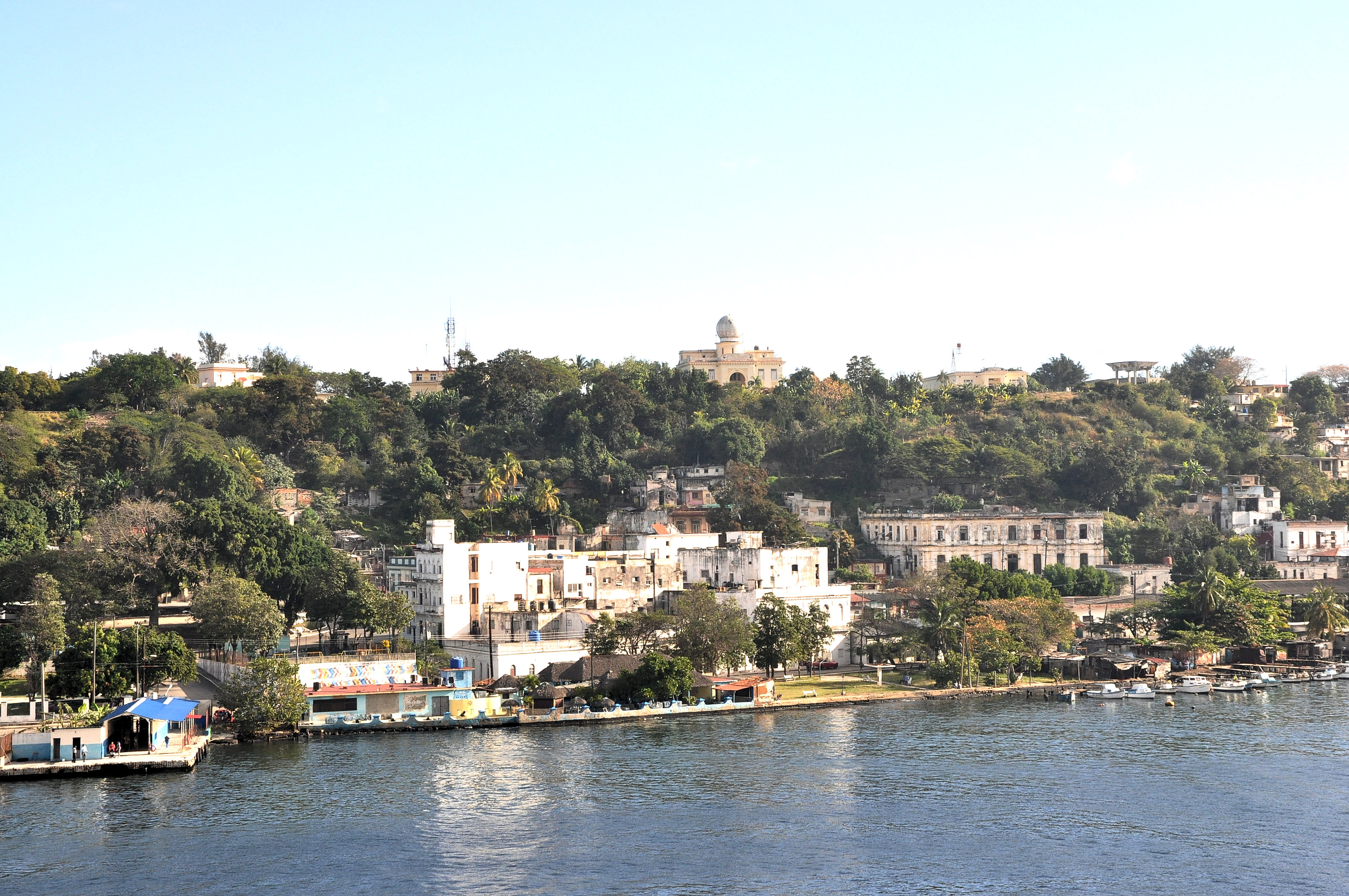
- Casablanca seen in 2017

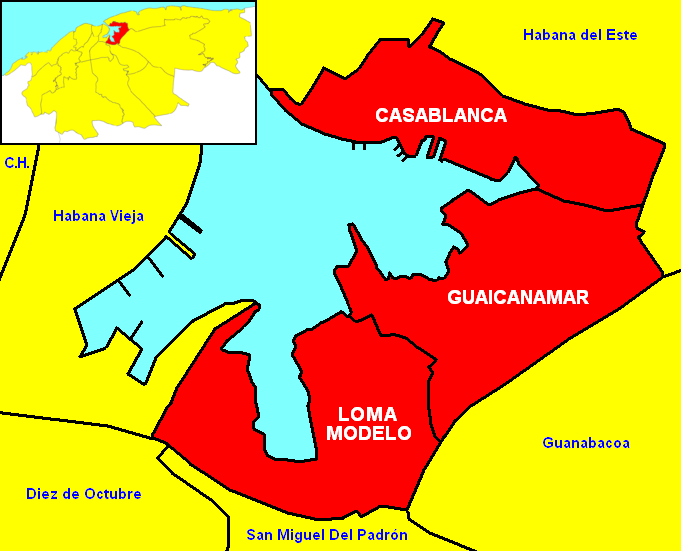
- Location of Casablanca (the northernmost of the 3 wards) within Regla and Havana

- Location of Casablanca in Cuba
- Coordinates: 23°08′33.0″N 82°20′27.2″W
- Country: Cuba
- Province: Ciudad de La Habana
- Municipal borough: Regla
- Established: 1762
- Elevation: 10 m (33 ft)

Population (2011)
  - Total: 3,433
- Time zone: UTC-5 (EST)
- Area code: +53-7

Casablanca (Spanish pronunciation: [kasaˈβlaŋka]) is a ward (consejo popular) of the city of Havana, the capital of Cuba, belonging to the municipal borough of Regla. It is situated to the east of the entrance to Havana Harbor.

== History ==
In 1762, the year of the capture of Havana by the British, a suburb of this name already existed. After 1763 navigators of cabotage and carpenters who repaired merchant ships lived there, and the carpenters established several workshops, in addition to the workshop that was created for the arsenal of the square. In 1846 it had 894 inhabitants and 120 houses. In 1858 its population had already reached 1,061.

== Transport ==
A frequent ferry links Casablanca with the dock at the foot of Santa Clara street in Old Havana. This is also the western terminus of the Hershey Electric Railway.

== Naval Base ==
Cuban Navy's two Rio Damuji-class frigates are stationed here. The base is a short distance from Caribbean Drydock Company SA, a repair and drydock facility.
