= History of the far-right in Spain =

History of far-right politics in Spain

The history of the far-right in Spain dates back to at least the 1800s and refers to any manifestation of far-right politics in Spain. Individuals and organizations associated with the far-right in Spain often employ reactionary traditionalism, religious fundamentalism, corporate Catholicism, and fascism in their ideological practice. In the case of Spain, according to historian Pedro Carlos González Cuevas, the predominance of Catholicism played an essential role in the suppression of external political innovations such as Social Darwinism, positivism, and vitalism in Spanish far-right politics.

== Cortes of Cádiz ==
In the Cortes of Cádiz of 1812, within the faction of realists (as opposed to the faction of more moderate reform conservatives), a subgroup of reactionary defenders of the Antiguo Régimen (Old Regime) was incorporated. One notable member of this subgroup was Pedro de Inguanzo y Rivero, a prominent Bishop (and later Archbishop of Toledo) who was proclaimed cardinal by Pope Leo XII.

== Bourbon Restoration ==
During the Bourbon Restoration, the extreme right in Spain, though united by Catholicism, saw increasing plurality; differences in views the far-right included Carlism, Maurism, social Catholicism, and nationalism. This overarching Catholicism was reinforced by the work of prominent Spanish historian Marcelino Menéndez Pelayo, who asserted that the Spanish volkgeist was that of Catholicism.

During the crisis of the Restoration, which was accentuated from 1914 onwards, the extreme right represented itself as a force against secularization of Spain and in favour of the interests of the Catholic elite; various far-right thinkers would meet in the Centro de Acción Nobiliaria (Nobility Action Centre). In 1919, the Sindicatos Libres was founded in Barcelona; the organization represented Carlist workers and carried out acts of terrorism against the anarcho-syndicalist Confederación Nacional del Trabajo. According to historian Colin M. Wilson, the Sindicatos Libres was a proto-fascist organization and was far-removed from the traditionalism that would come to define Spanish fascism.

The period of the Alfonso XIII regime directly preceding the establishment of the Second Republic, marked by the dictatorships of Miguel Primo de Rivera, Dámaso Berenguer, and Juan Bautista Aznar-Cabañas (1923–1931), saw the consolidation and strengthening of ultra-conservative, anti-liberal, and anti-democratic forces within the Spanish Army, who promoted these far-right positions through the publications El Ejército Español ("The Spanish Army"), and from 1928 onwards, La Correspondencia Militar ("The Military Correspondence").

In March 1931, mere days before the collapse of the Spanish monarchy, the far-right publication La Conquista del Estado ("The Conquest of the State") was founded to promote fascist views to the working masses. The publication's director, Ramiro Ledesma, was influenced by German philosophy and by the French philosopher Georges Sorel. By 1931, Ledesma was receiving funding for the publication from Biscay monarchists such as José María de Areilza, José Antonio Sangróniz, and José Félix de Lequerica.

== Second Republic ==
According to Eduardo González Calleja, the predominant form of Spanish fascism in the interwar period was characterized by a "traditionalist ethos" and a "counterrevolutionary" character. The Spanish right wing opted for violent political opposition of liberalism and embraced fascism.

With the advent of the Second Republic, ideologues of the far-right began to associate themselves with the Acción Española, a cultural and political association founded in late 1931, and began to take influence from the nativism and traditionalism of Action Française, of Italian fascism, of Portuguese integralism, and of the German authoritarianism of Carl Schmitt and Oswald Spengler.

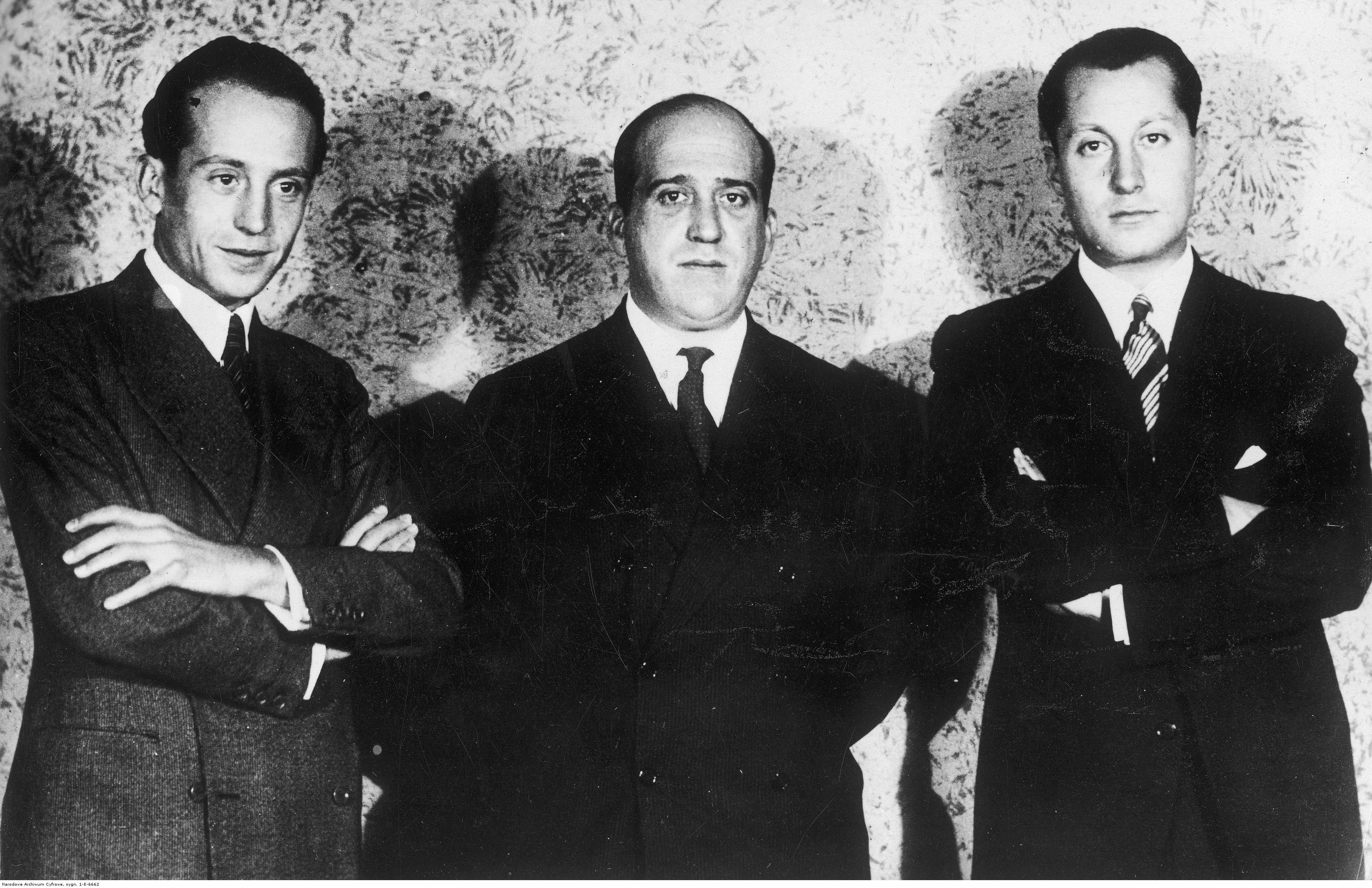
Alfonso García Valdecasas (left), Julio Ruiz de Alda (center) and José Antonio Primo de Rivera (right), in 1933.

After the rise of Adolf Hitler in Germany in 1933, fascism in Spain increased; until then, according to Italian historian Gabriele Ranzato, fascism was a niche current and did not take space in public life beyond the half-cooked writings of Ernesto Giménez Caballero and the unpopular Partido Nacionalista Español (Spanish Nationalist Party). A number of fascist organizations were founded in this period, including the Movimiento Español Sindicalista (MES), and Falange Española and the Juntas de Ofensiva Nacional-Sindicalista. The Falange Española, founded by José Antonio Primo de Rivera, lawyer and eldest son of dictator Miguel Primo de Rivera, aviator Julio Ruiz de Alda, and intellectual Alfonso García Valdecasas, would in 1934 merge with the Juntas de Ofensiva Nacional-Sindicalista to create the Falange Española de las JONS.

The Falange counted a number of retired military officers and members of the pro-fascist Spanish Military Union in its ranks, including Emilio Rodríguez Tarduchy, Luis Arredondo, Ricardo Rada, and Román Ayza. Another member of the military and monarchist activist, Juan Antonio Ansaldo, was put in charge of organizing the paramilitary components of the party: the "Falange de Sangre" and the "Primera Línea".

During the period of the Second Spanish Republic, an increase in antisemitism, often apocalyptic in nature, resonated amongst Carlists and monarchists and led to the weakening of the moderate right.

Ramiro de Maeztu, a member of Acción Española and one of the main theorists of the Spanish extreme right, promoted in En defensa de la Hispanidad ("In Defense of Hispanidad", 1934) one of the fundamental myths of the extreme right: "Hispanidad", the reimagination of imperialist and Catholic legacy of Spain. Hispanidad would be embraced by Acción Española, the Falange, and, later, by Fuerza Nueva ("New Force"). Both Maeztu and the politician José Calvo Sotelo published articles that promoted fascism and urged an anti-Republican alliance that would include traditionalists and Falangists in the lead-up to the Spanish Civil War.

== Francoist Spain ==
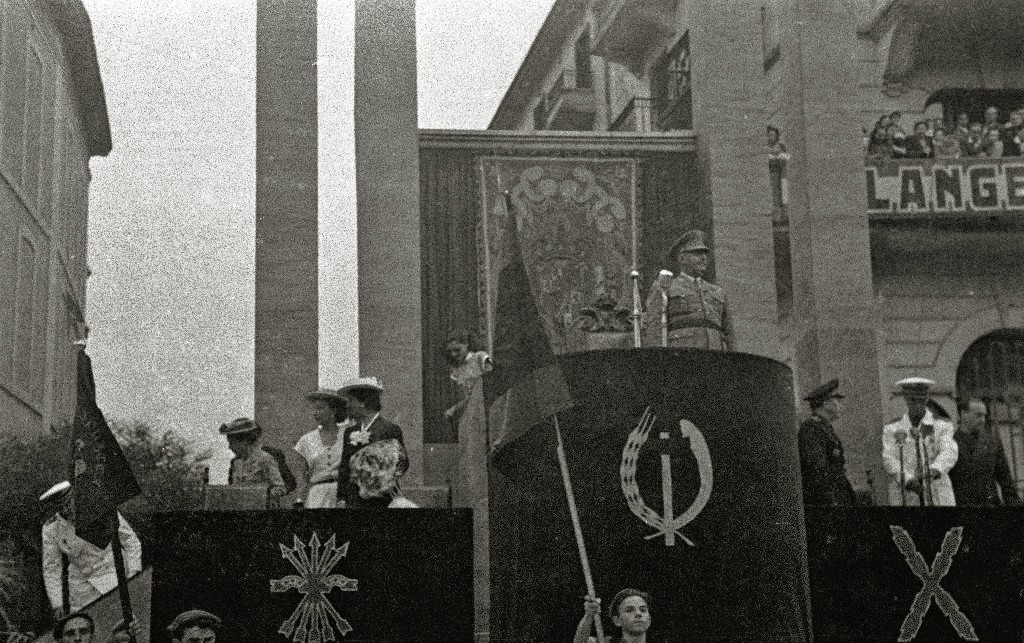
Franco visits Tolosa, 1948.

Following the Nationalist victory in the Spanish Civil War, Spain was ruled by the FET y de las JONS-backed dictator Francisco Franco. The Franco dictatorship, analogous to that of other European fascist regimes of the twentieth century, incorporated into its ideology charismatic leadership, fascist imagery, and the embrace of an all-encompassing fascist state and nation. Two political cultures converged during the dictatorship: that of National Catholicism, and that of FET y de las JONS-style fascism.

Starting in the 1950s, a number of right-wing associations and organizations were created under the protection of the Delegación Nacional de Asociaciones ("National Delegation of Associations") and the FET y de las JONS, including the Círculos Doctrinales José Antonio, the Hermandad de Alféreces Provisionales, and the Hermandad de la División Azul. These organizations, alongside other prominent figures like the historian José Luis Rodríguez Jiménez, expressed concern in the longevity of the Franco regime and a concern about loss of power in post-fascist Europe.

During the 1970s, in the late Francoist period, a more radical sector of the ultra-right emerged. The Círculo Español de Amigos de Europa ("Spanish Circle of Friends of Europe", or CEDADE), a neo-Nazi organization, achieved some public recognition and was supported by some leading figures of the Franco regime, such as Tomás García Rebull.

Among the prominent figures of the extreme-right who gained prominence in Franco's Spain was Gonzalo Fernández de la Mora, a member of Spain's Congress of Deputies who advocated for dictatorial monarchism, eugenics, and suppression of "egalitarian envy".

== Transition to democracy ==
After Franco's death, during the period of transition to democracy in Spain, the far-right implemented a so-called "estrategia de la tensión" ("strategy of tension") aimed at preventing the smooth consolidation of a liberal democratic system, carrying out a number of acts of terrorism. Groups such as the Alianza Apostólica Anticomunista ("Apostolic Anti-Communist Alliance"), the AntiTerrorismo ETA, the Grupos Armados Españoles ("Spanish Armed Groups"), the Guerrilleros de Cristo Rey, the Batallón Vasco Español, and a number of other right-wing groups organized demonstrations that called for the assumption of power by Spain's military, and publishing a number of calls for a coup. The anti-communist and Nazi-aligned Blue Division also saw renewed interest.

At the beginning of the transition period, the electoral division of the far-right was represented by the Alianza Nacional 18 de Julio coalition and by the Alianza Popular. During the 1979 Spanish general election, the extreme right won a single seat through the Fuerza Nueva ("New Force") coalition led by the charismatic Blas Piñar. Fuerza Nueva attempted to stifle political reform through continuous activism and mobilization of far-right forces; the paramilitarism, uniforms, and violence of Fuerza Nueva attracted a number of young people to the organization. The failure of the 1981 Spanish coup d'état attempt led to the abandonment of advocating for a military coup.

== Post-transition period ==
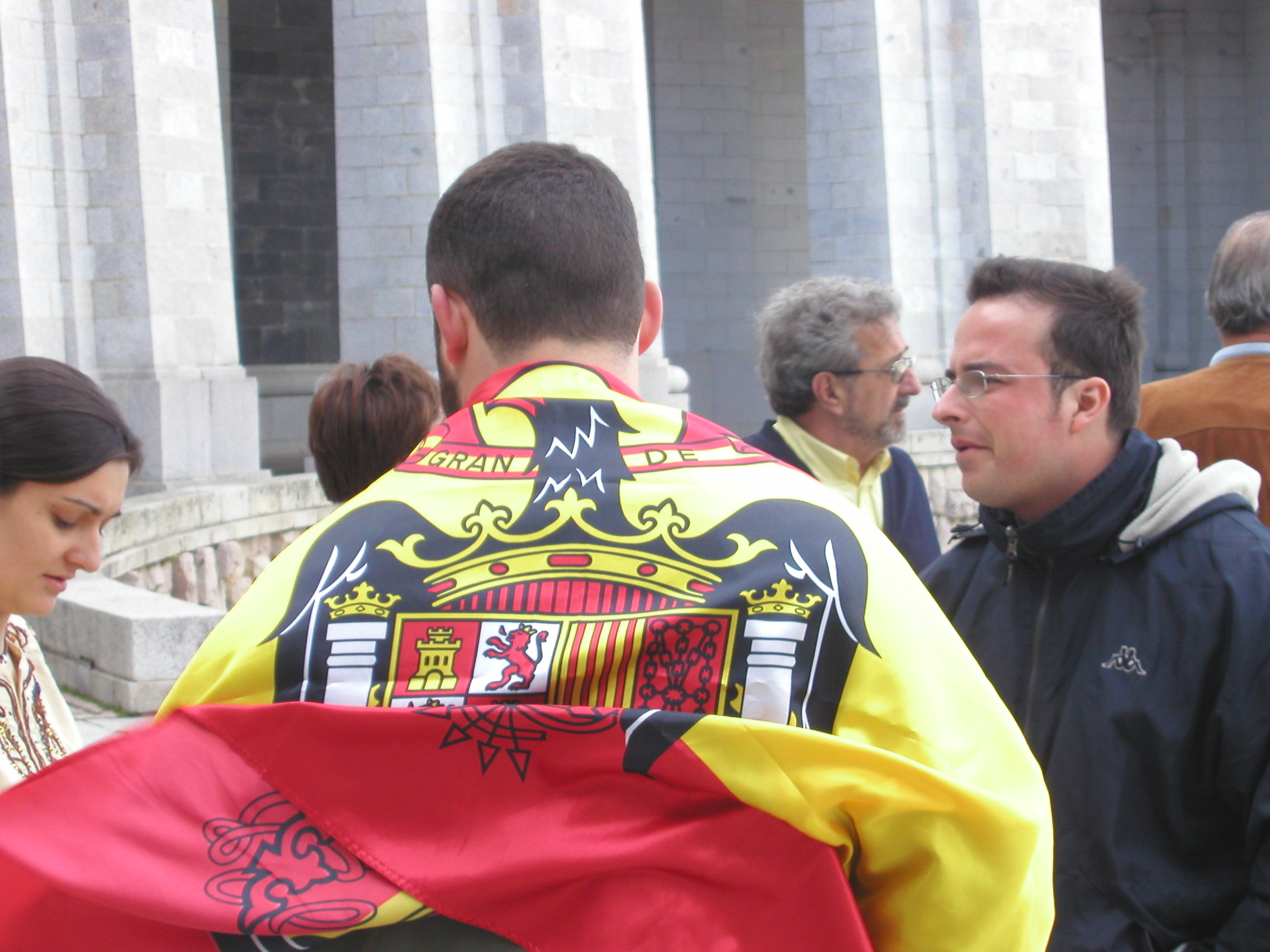
National-Catholic demonstration in the Valley of the Fallen, 2005.

After Spain's transition to democracy, the far-right began to experience large-scale unpopularity and abandonment by members. This weakening of the far-right was compounded by splits between neo-Francoists and those who advocated for unity with other European far-right organizations. The 1990s saw the dissolution of a number of far-right organizations: CEDADE was dissolved in 1993, as well as the Blas Piñar-led Fuerza Nueva, and in 1995 the Juntas Españolas dissolved as well. The latter gave rise to the founding of Democracia Nacional ("National Democracy"), which competed without much success in elections against other marginal right-wing groups such as the Alianza por la Unidad Nacional ("Alliance for National Unity"), the Falange Española Independiente, and the re-founded Falange Española de las JONS. In 1997, the Partido Demócrata Español ("Spanish Democratic Party") was founded, formed by militants that split from the Partido Popular and who achieved modest results in the 1999 elections to European Parliament.

The dawn of the 21st century saw the birth of two new far-right parties in Spain: the Plataforma per Catalunya ("Platform for Catalonia") and España 2000, based in Barcelona and Valencia, respectively. While the former attempted to integrate both Catalanists and non-Catalanists, the latter took the position of a more strict Spanish nationalism and Blaverism. Both the Plataforma per Catalunya and España 2000 achieved some success in elections. In 2013, the far-right political party Vox was founded.

In 2014, squatters in Madrid formed the "Hogar Social Madrid" (HSM, originally "Hogar Social Ramiro Ledesma"), a neo-Nazi collective inspired by Greece's Golden Dawn and Italy's CasaPound that distributes food to Spaniards.

Vox, a far-right party founded in 2013, began to see more success following the 2018 Andalusian regional election, and became the first far-right party to obtain parliamentary representation in an autonomous region of Spain. The jump to power was sudden with their leader Santiago Abascal saying "Only 11 months ago, we did not have any representation in any institution [in Spain]," This election also saw the introduction of Super-PAC financing schemes in Spain. Vox benefited from donations by ultraconservative lobbies such as HazteOír and CitizenGo.

== Bibliography ==
- Álvarez Chillida, Gonzalo (1996). José María Pemán: pensamiento y trayectoria de un monárquico (1897-1941). Cádiz: Servicio Publicaciones de la Universidad de Cádiz. p. 134. ISBN 84-7786-305-9.
- Álvarez Chillida, Gonzalo (2007). La eclosión del antisemitismo español: de la II República al holocausto. En: Gonzalo Álvarez Chillida y Ricardo Izquierdo Benito (Coords.). Cuenca: Ediciones de la Universidad de Castilla-La Mancha. pp. 181–206. ISBN 978-84-8427-471-1.
- Casals Meseguer, Xavier (2000). "La ultraderecha española: una presencia ausente (1975-1999)". Historia y Política (3): 147–172. ISSN 1575-0361.
- Casals Meseguer, Xavier (2009). "La renovación de la extrema derecha española: una historia generacional (1966-2008)". Historia y Política (Madrid) (22): 233–258. ISSN 1575-0361.
- Casals Meseguer, Xavier (2017). La evolución de la ultraderecha en España: claves históricas y territoriales . Real Instituto Elcano.
- Carnero Arbat, Teresa (2002). "Política de masas y parlamento: entre la continuidad y la ruptura (1890-1923)". España e Italia en la Europa contemporánea: desde finales del siglo XIX a las dictaduras. En: Fernando García Sanz (Ed.) (Madrid: Consejo Superior de Investigaciones Científicas). ISBN 84-00-08043-2.
- Cobo Romero, Francisco (2008). "El franquismo y los imaginarios míticos del fascismo europeo de entreguerras". In: Francisco Cobo and Teresa María Ortega (Eds.). Ayer. La extrema derecha en la España contemporánea 71 (71): 117–151. ISSN 1134-2277.
- Gago Vaquero, Francisco (2013). "Antecedentes del Cincopun tismo". Tiempo y sociedad (11): 149–165. ISSN 1989-6883.
- Gallego, Ferran (2008). "Nostalgia y modernización. La extrema derecha española entre la crisis final del franquis mo y la consolidación de la democracia (1973-1986)". En: Francisco Cobo y Teresa María Ortega (Eds.). Ayer. La extrema derecha en la España contemporánea 71 (71): 153–174. ISSN 1134-2277.
- González Calleja, Eduardo (1994). "Camisas de fuerza: Fascismo y paramilitarización". Historia contemporánea (11): 55–81. ISSN 1130-2402.
- González Calleja, Eduardo (2008). "La violencia y sus discursos: los límites de la "fas cistización" de la derecha española durante el régimen de la Segunda República Eduardo González Calleja". In: Francisco Cobo and Teresa María Ortega (Eds.). Ayer. La extrema derecha en la España contemporánea 71 (71): 85–116. ISSN 1134-2277.
- González Cuevas, Pedro Carlos (2001). "Las tradiciones ideológicas de la extrema derech a española". Hispania. Revista Española de Historia (Madrid: Consejo Superior de Investigaciones Científicas) 61 (207).
- González Cuevas, Pedro Carlos (2008). "Tradicionalismo, catolicismo y nacionalismo: la extrema derecha durante el régimen de la Restauración (1898-1930)". In: Francisco Cobo and Teresa María Ortega (Eds.). Ayer. La extrema derecha en la España contemporánea 71 (71): 25–52. ISSN 1134-2277.
- González Sáez, Juan Manuel (2012). "La violencia política de la extrema derecha durantela transición española (1975-1982)". In: Carlos Navajas Zubeldia and Diego Iturriaga Barco (Eds.). Coetánea: Actas del III Congreso Internacional de Historia de Nuestro Tiempo (Logroño: Universidad de La Rioja): 365–376. ISBN 978-84-695-5155-4.
- Lénárt, András (2009). "La vía violenta. La actividad de grupos terroristas menores en España". Mediterrán tanulmányok: 53–66.
- Muñoz Alonso, Alejandro (1986). "Golpismo y terrorismo en la Transición Democrática Española". Reis (Centro de Investigaciones Sociológicas): 25–33.
- Muñoz Bolaños, Roberto (2018). "Escuadras de la muerte : militares, Falange y terrorismo en la II República". Amnis 17. ISSN 1764-7193. doi:10.4000/amnis.3616.
- Navajas Zubeldia, Carlos (2001). "La salvaguardia de lo permanente. Las extremas derechas militares en la España del siglo XX". Hispania. Revista Española de Historia (Madrid: Consejo Superior de Investigaciones Científicas) 61 (207): 69–98. ISSN 0018-2141. doi:10.3989/Hispania.2001.v61.i207.307.
- Núñez Seixas, Xosé Manoel (2005). "Los vencedores vencidos: la peculiar memoria de la División Azul (1945-2005)". Pasado y Memoria. Revista de Historia Contemporánea (Alicante: Universidad de Alicante) 4: 83–113.
- Perfecto, Miguel Ángel (2012). "La derecha radical española y el pensamiento antiliberal francés en el primer tercio del siglo XX. De Charles Maurras a Georges Valois". Stvdia Historica. Historia Contemporánea (Salamanca: Ediciones universidad de Salamanca) (30): 47–94.
- Ramos, Miquel; Büttner, Frauke (2017). Women and Gender Ideologies in the Far Right in Spain. In: Michaela Köttig, Renate Bitzan, Andrea Petö (Eds.). Palgrave Macmillan. pp. 111–126. ISBN 978-3-319-43533-6. doi:10.1007/978-3-319-43533-6.
- Ranzato, Gabriele (2006). El eclipse de la democracia: la Guerra Civil española y sus orígenes, 1931-1939. (translated by Fernando Borrajo). Madrid: Siglo XXI de España Editores. ISBN 978-84-323-1248-9.
- Rodríguez Jiménez, José Luis Rodríguez Jiménez (1994). Reaccionarios y golpistas: la extrema derecha en España. Del tardofranquismo a la consolidación de la democracia, 1967-1982. Madrid: Consejo Superior de Investigaciones Científicas. ISBN 84-00-07442-4.
- Rodríguez Jiménez, José Luis (2006). "De la vieja a la nueva extrema derecha (pasando por la fascinación por el fascismo)". HAOL (87): 87–99. ISSN 1696-2060.
- Rodríguez Jiménez, José Luis (2012). "Historia de un fracaso y ¿de una refundación?: De la vieja a la nueva extrema derecha en España (1975-2012)". Stvdia Historica. Historia Contemporánea (Salamanca: Universidad de Salamanca) 30: 231–268.
- Saz, Ismael (2008). "Las culturas de los nacionalismos franquistas". In: Francisco Cobo and Teresa María Ortega (Eds.). Ayer. La extrema derecha en la España contemporánea 71 (71): 153–174. ISSN 1134-2277.
- Winston, Colin M. (1982). "The Proletarian Carlist Road to Fascism: Sindicalismo Libre".Journal of Contemporary History 17 (4): 557–585. ISSN 0022-0094. JSTOR 260522.
