= F.E. (periodical) =

1933–1934 Spanish newspaper

F.E. was a Spanish periodical published in Madrid from 1933 to 1934, serving as the official organ of the Falange Española party.

== History ==
The first issue was published on December 7, 1933. It was personally directed by José Antonio Primo de Rivera. F.E. consisted of twelve pages containing various sections, such as "Falange Española," "University Falanges," "Union Life," "National," and "International." Contributors included Manuel Mateo, Felipe Ximénez de Sandoval, and Rafael Sánchez Mazas, among others. Efforts were made to include literary content, with contributions from Samuel Ros, Ernesto Giménez Caballero, José María Alfaro, and Víctor d'Ors—son of Eugenio d'Ors. Sánchez Mazas was responsible for the "Guidelines and Style Directives" section of the publication.

F.E. was published weekly, with a total of twelve issues. The publication was supportive of Nazi Germany, and it published openly anti-Semitic content. Its distribution led to numerous conflicts, including censorship, government seizures, and street altercations, resulting in the deaths of several Falange members. One notable case was that of student Matías Montero, a member of the SEU. The last issue was published on April 26, 1934.

After its discontinuation, it was succeeded by the weekly newspaper Arriba, which became the new official organ of Falange.

== Bibliography ==
- Checa Godoy, Antonio (2006). Press and Political Parties During the Second Republic. University of Salamanca. ISBN 84-7481-521-5.
- De la Hera Martínez, Jesús (2002). Germany's Cultural Policy in Spain in the Interwar Period. Madrid: CSIC.
- Egido León, María de los Ángeles (1987). The Conception of Spanish Foreign Policy During the Second Republic (1931-1936). Madrid: UNED.
- Pizarroso Quintero, Alejandro; Aguilera, César (1994). Historia de la prensa [History of the Press] (in Spanish). Centro de Estudios Ramón Areces.
- Rodríguez Jiménez, José Luis (2000). History of the Falange Española and the JONS. Madrid: Alianza Editorial. ISBN 84-206-6750-1.
- Rodríguez Puértolas, Julio (2008). Historia de la literatura fascista española [History of Fascist Spanish Literature] (in Spanish). Vol. I. Akal.
