= FE (magazine) =

Spanish political magazine, 1933 and 1934

FE (FAITH) was the main publication of the Falange Española but was also used by the Juntas de Ofensiva Nacional-Sindicalista (JONS) from 7 December 1933 to 26 April 1934.

== History ==
Its first issue appeared on 7 December 1933. It was directed by José Antonio Primo de Rivera, the leader of the Falange Española and later the Falange Española de las JONS. FE consisted of twelve pages that housed various sections, such as: "Falange Española", "Sindicato Español Universitario", "Trade Union Life", "National", "International" etc. Contributors included Manuel Mateo, director of conservative newspaper La Nación, Felipe Ximénez de Sandoval and Rafael Sánchez Mazas, influential Falangist writer and one of the party's figureheads. An effort was made to give it literary content, a task in which Samuel Ros, Ernesto Giménez Caballero, director of the avant-garde magazine La Gaceta Literaria, José María Alfaro, head of the Higher Council of Scientific Research (CSIC) during Franco's rule of Spain and Víctor d'Ors who stood out was the son of Eugenio d'Ors, General Director on Fine Arts in the Francoist provisional government during the Spanish Civil War. Sánchez Mazas was in charge of the "Guidelines for Rules and Style" section of the publication.

FE was published weekly, with twelve issues appearing. The publication was supportive of Nazi Germany, and even published openly antisemitic content on some instances. Its distribution was the cause of numerous conflicts, including censorship, government seizures and street clashes. As a result, several members of the Falange were killed. A famous case was that of the student Matías Montero, a member of the Sindicato Español Universitario that was shot dead distributing FE. He would become the first martyr of Falangism and the day of his death will be commemorated as the Day of the Fallen Student. The last issue of the publication came out on 26 April 1934. It was succeeded by the weekly Arriba, which became the new official publication of the Falange Española de las JONS.
