= Matías Montero (student) =

Spanish student

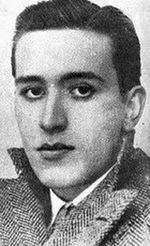
- Matías Montero in 1933.
- Born: June 28, 1913; Madrid, Spain
- Died: February 9, 1934 (aged 20); Álvarez Mendizábal Street, Madrid
- Cause of death: Gunshot wound
- Burial place: Sacramental of Santa María
- Occupation: Student
- Organization: Sindicato Español Universitario
- Political party: Falange Española

Matías Montero y Rodríguez de Trujillo (Madrid, June 28, 1913 – Madrid, February 9, 1934) was a student and Falangist militant, assassinated in 1934 by several socialist gunmen of the PSOE (Spanish Socialist Workers Party), including Francisco Tello Tortajada. After his assassination, Montero became a martyr of the Falangist movement and later, of Francoist Spain.

== Biography ==
Coming from a wealthy family, he was a medical student in Madrid. He was originally a member of the leftist Federación Universitaria Escolar (University Student Federation;FUE), he would later leave and join the Falange Española. He was subsequently one of the co-founders of the Falange's Sindicato Español Universitario (SEU). In January 1934, he participated, along with Agustín Aznar and other Falangists, in the assault on an FUE office and the attack on several of its members, one of whom, Antonio Zárraga García, was shot but recovered. On February 9 of that year, while selling the party's official newspaper FE on Álvarez Mendizábal Street in Madrid, he was assassinated by several gunmen. One of the assassins was Francisco Tello Tortajada, a member of the Juventudes Socialistas de España (Socialist Youth of Spain). The assassination resonated strongly among university circles opposed to the FUE.

During his burial, the cry of "Presente!" was heard for the first time. This was a chant the Falangists had adopted from the classical fascists.

== Legacy ==
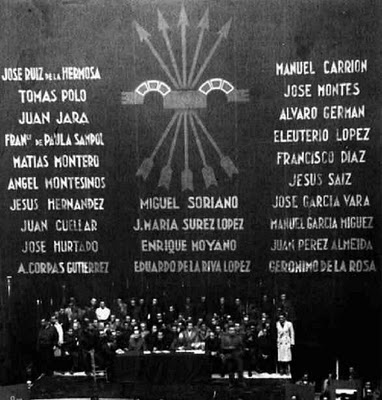
Curtain of the fallen of FE de las JONS, in 1935. With Montero's name the 5th one down on the left side.

As the first Falange militant to be assassinated in an attack. Four other members had previously died in various brawls—Montero became the organization's main martyr, and one of the most prominent figures of the Francoist dictatorship, along with José Antonio Primo de Rivera, founder and leader of the Falange Española who was later executed. Primo de Rivera himself brought private charges against Montero's assassin, Francisco Tello. At Matías Montero's funeral, Primo de Rivera delivered the eulogy in which he said: "Brother and comrade Matías Montero y Rodríguez de Trujillo! Thank you for your example. May God grant you eternal rest, and may we deny ourselves rest until we know how to win for Spain the harvest sown by your death." This same speech would be the one given by Generalissimo Franco when José Antonio Primo de Rivera was buried in the Valley of the Fallen.

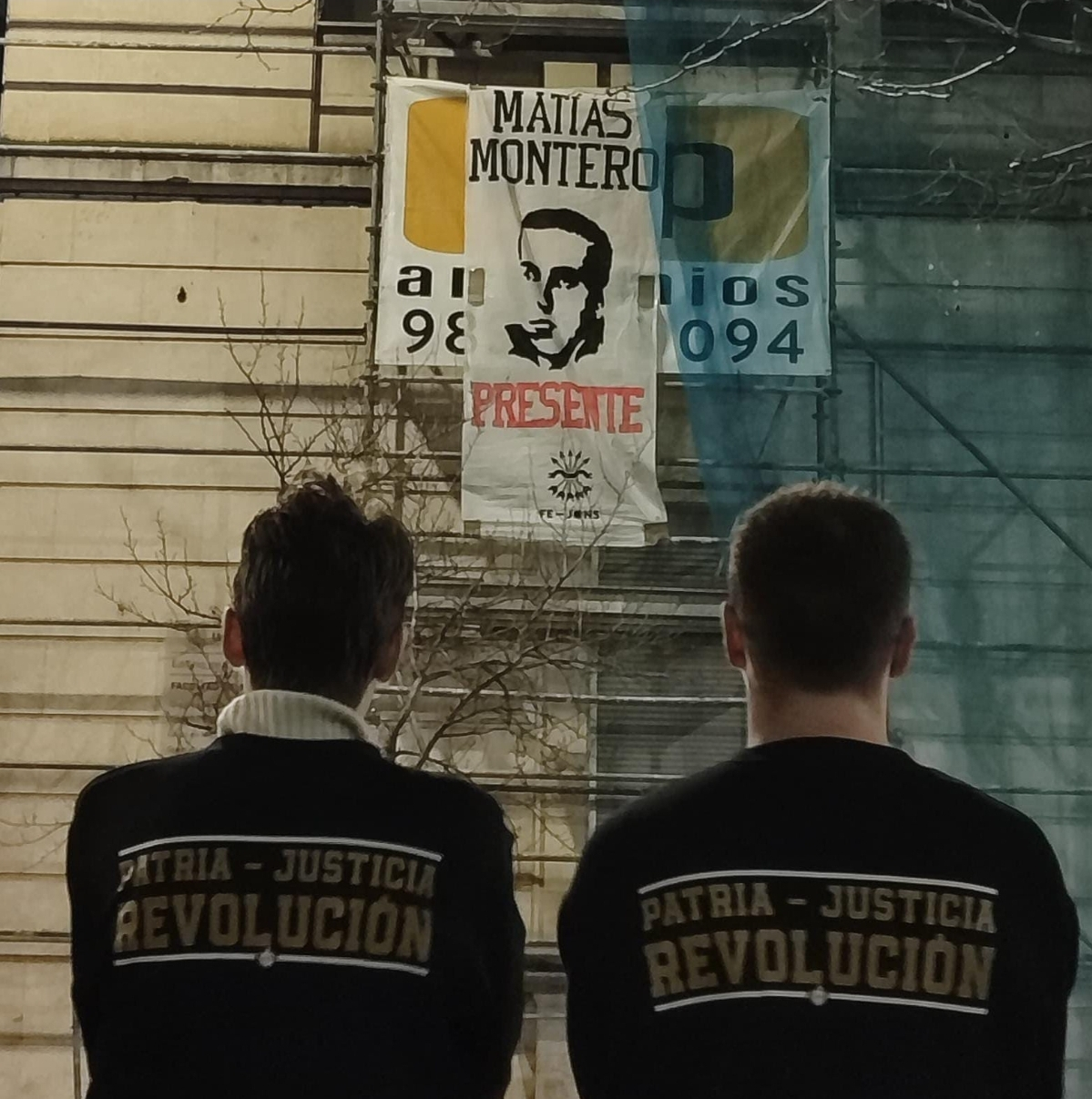
Falange Española de las JONS banner from February 9th, 2026.

As a symbol, Montero received numerous tributes after his death, elevating him to the status of an example for Falangists to follow. During the Spanish Civil War, on February 5, 1938, the Ministry of Education, headed by Pedro Sainz Rodríguez, declared February 9 a holiday in the country's educational centers, calling it the "Day of the Fallen Student," thus including Montero in the martyrology of the rebel side, beyond the Falange itself. To prevent the institutionalization of "Day of the Fallen Student" from being interpreted as a "gesture of appeasement towards the Falange," the monarchist Sainz Rodríguez decreed on the same day, February 5, 1938, that March 7 would be commemorated as the day of Saint Thomas, "a marvel of wisdom and a model of holiness."

== Bibliography ==
- Box Varela, Zira (2008). La fundación de un régimen. La construcción simbólica del franquismo (PDF). Complutense University of Madrid. Archived from the original on 2012-10-15.
- Box, Zira (2010). Spain, Year Zero. The Symbolic Construction of Francoism. Madrid: Alianza Editorial. ISBN 978-84-206-6870-3.
- Casanova, Julián (2010). The Spanish Republic and Civil War. Cambridge University Press.
- Gil Pecharromán, Julio (1996). José Antonio Primo de Rivera: portrait of a visionary. Today's Topics.
- Jiménez-Landi, Antonio (1996). The Free Institution of Teaching and its environment. Madrid: Editorial Complutense.
- Payne, Stanley (1997). Franco and José Antonio. The strange case of Spanish fascism. Barcelona: Planeta.
- Perales, Germán (2005). Catholics and liberals: The student movement at the University of Valencia (1875-1939). University of Valencia.
- Semprún, Alfredo (2005). The crime that sparked the Civil War. Libroslibres.
- Thomas, Hugh (1976). History of the Spanish Civil War. Barcelona: Círculo de Lectores. ISBN 84-226-0874-X.
- Ximénez de Sandoval, Felipe (1980). José Antonio (A passionate biography). Fuerza Nueva.
