= El Fascio =

Spanish newspaper (1933)

El Fascio (Spanish: The Fasces), subtitled "Hispanic Force", was a Spanish fascist publication from Madrid, intended to be a periodical printed weekly, but having only one edition. Starting as an effect of Hitler's victory in the German elections of 1933, its launch was prepared at the home of the writer and propagandist Ernesto Giménez Caballero by various figures of the Spanish far right under the supervision of Mussolini's envoys in Spain, such as Italian ambassador in Madrid, Raffaele Guariglia; its financing was provided, among others, by the magnate Juan March. Its editor was Manuel Delgado Barreto (also editor of La Nación, a conservative newspaper), and contributors included José Antonio Primo de Rivera, founder of the Falange Española and FE de las JONS, alongside the aforementioned Giménez Caballero,Rafael Sánchez Mazas, a nationalist writer, Ramiro Ledesma, a nationalist author, Juan Aparicio, and Juan Pujol Martínez. Besides editing it, Delgado Barreto also financed the publication.

The newspaper had a short-lived existence. Only one issue was published, on March 16, 1933, after which it was seized by the Republican government. Ricardo de la Cierva described this as "a police seizure," Eduardo González Calleja called the action "excessive," and Ian Gibson considered the closure of the weekly a "very serious mistake." In Stanley Payne 's opinion, El Fascio, throughout its articles, advocated, in broad terms, the establishment of a fascist state in Spain, modeled on Italy. According to Gibson, "the idea was to found a large fascist magazine, with a large circulation, then projected at 150,000 copies."

== Bibliography ==
- Checa Godoy, Antonio (1989). Prensa y partidos políticos durante la II República. Universidad de Salamanca. ISBN 84-7481-521-5.
- Cierva, Ricardo de la (1981). Historia general de España: La Segunda República. Vol. 10. Editorial Planeta. ISBN 978-84-8575-300-0.
- González Calleja, Eduardo (2011). Contrarrevolucionarios: Radicalización violenta de las derechas durante la Segunda República, 1931–1936. Alianza Editorial. ISBN 978-84-206-6455-2.
- González Calleja, Eduardo (2012). "La prensa carlista y falangista durante laSegunda República y la Guerra Civil (1931–1937)". El Argonauta español. 9 (9). doi:10.4000/argonauta.819. ISSN 1765-2901.
- Payne, Stanley G. (1999). Fascism in Spain, 1923–1977. University of Wisconsin Press. ISBN 978-02-9916-564-2.
- Pérez Coterillo, Moisés (27 February 1980). "José Antonio,un esqueleto en el armario". ABC. Madrid. pp. 48–51. ISSN 1136-0143.
