= Movimiento Español Sindicalista =

Spanish political organization

Spanish Syndicalist Movement Movimiento Español Sindicalista
- Abbreviation: MES
- Leader: José Antonio Primo de Rivera
- Founder: José Antonio Primo de Rivera; Rafael Sánchez Mazas; Julio Ruiz de Alda
- Founded: 20 April 1933
- Dissolved: 29 October 1933
- Succeeded by: Falange Española
- Ideology: National syndicalism
- Political position: Far-right
- Religion: Catholicism

The Spanish Syndicalist Movement (Spanish: Movimiento Español Sindicalista) was a Spanish far-right political movement and predecessor of the Falange Española.

== History ==
The movement, which emerged in early 1933, was founded primarily by José Antonio Primo de Rivera, writer Rafael Sánchez Mazas, and aviator Julio Ruiz de Alda. Other notable members of the MES were Dionisio Ridruejo, Alfonso García Valdecasas, Manuel Sarrión, and Andrés de la Cuerda. Members of the MES openly embraced fascism and for a time the movement was known as the Movimiento Español Sindicalista-Fascismo Español (MES-FE, or Spanish Syndicalist-Fascist Movement). It soon became apparent that the MES was to have little political success on its own.

In August 1933, José Antonio Primo de Rivera signed the "Pacto de El Escorial" ("El Escorial Pact"), wherein a pact of solidarity was formed between Spanish monarchists and the MES-FE. On 29 October 1933, in the midst of an electoral campaign, the MES held a rally at the Teatro de la Comedia in Madrid and re-founded itself as the Falange Española. The Falange Española would be succeeded by the Falange Española de las JONS, which was itself merged in April 1937 into the FET y de las JONS, which backed Francisco Franco as leader of Spain.
