= Julio Ruiz =

Julio Ruiz may refer to:

- Julio Ruiz de Alda (1897–1936), Spanish aviator and founding member of the Falange
- Julio Ruiz Bourgeois (fl. 1950), Chilean politician
- Julio Ruiz (actor), appeared in The Suicide Squad (film)
