= Phalangist Party =

Phalangist Party may refer to:

- a party of Falangism, in Spain
  - Falange Española, 1933–1934
  - Falange Española de las JONS, 1934–1937
  - FET y de las JONS, 1937–1977
  - Falange Española de las JONS (1976)
- Kataeb Party, a Christian right-wing political party in Lebanon
