= Camisas viejas =

Spanish term

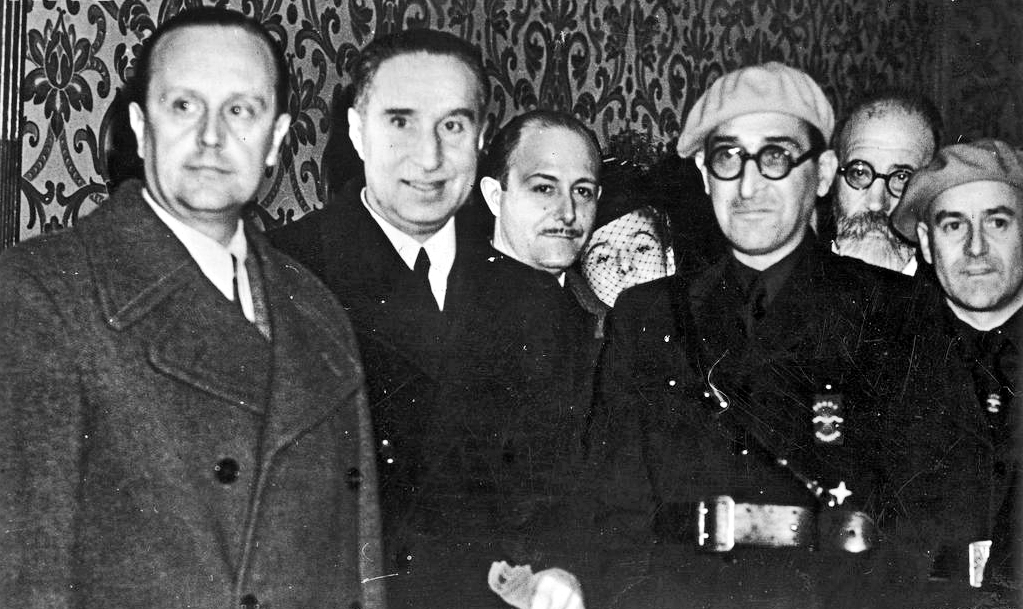
The figure on the left is Raimundo Fernández-Cuesta, the figure on the right wearing a beret and glasses is Rafael Sánchez Mazas, the photograph was taken in March 1939. Both were prominent camisas viejas.

Camisas viejas (old shirts) is a Spanish term referring to members of the FET y de las JONS who were previously members of the Falange Española de las JONS prior to its transformation into the FET y de las JONS by Spanish Caudillo Francisco Franco through the Unification Decree.

Significant political differences existed between the camisas viejas and other members of the FET y de las JONS. One of them was a tendency among them to be anti-clerical out of views that the Catholic Church in Spain had become associated with capitalist oligarchy by the early twentieth century in the country, however they did not challenge Catholicism itself as being a religion of the state.

== See also ==
- Falangism
- Francoist Spain
- Spanish Civil War
