= Teatro de la Comedia =

Theatre in Madrid, Spain

Comedy Theater
- Teatro de la Comedia
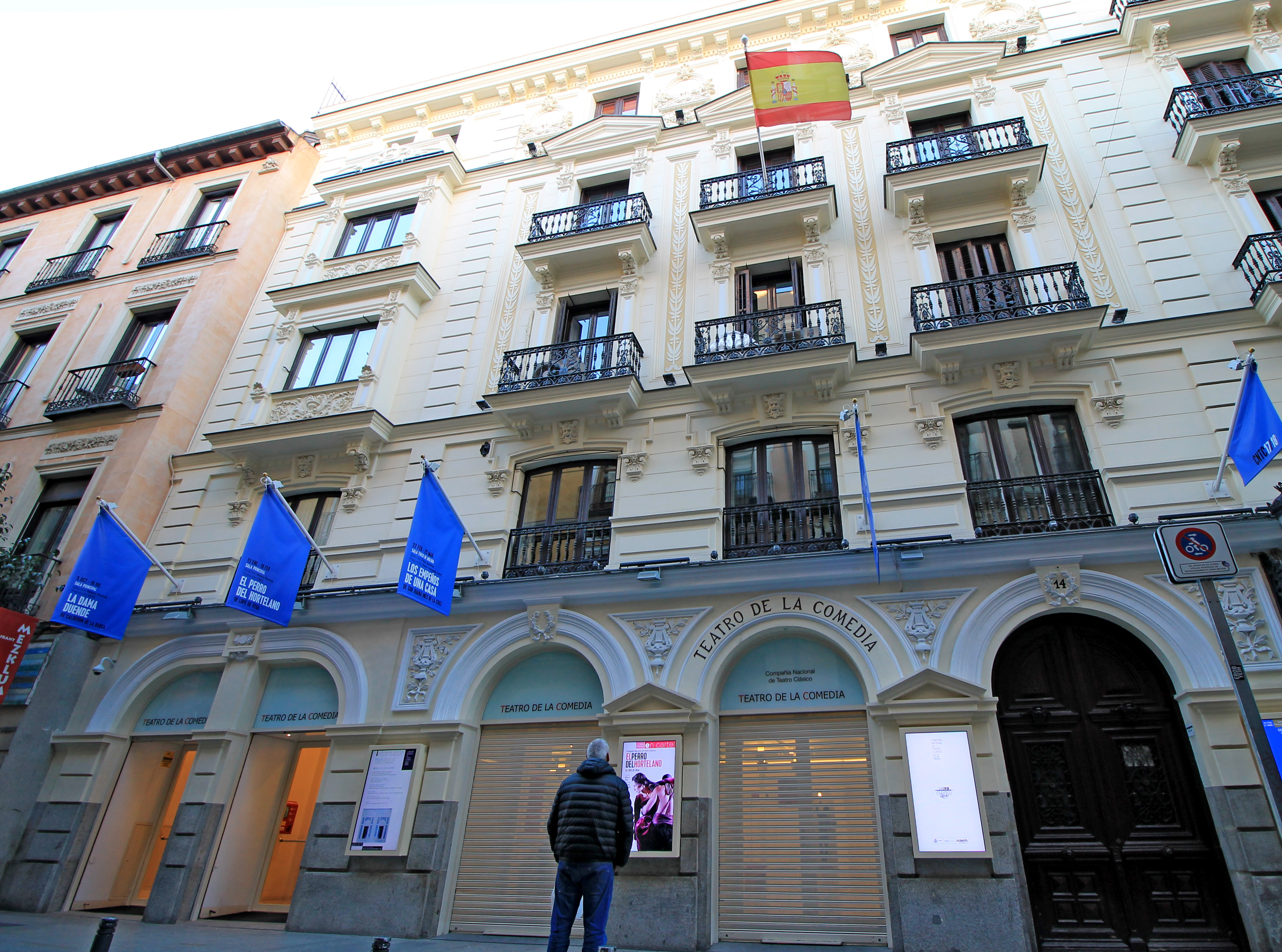
- Interactive map of Comedy Theater
- Address: Prince Street, 14; Madrid; Spain
- Coordinates: 40.415569°N 3.700392°W
- Owner: CNTC
- Capacity: 630+100
- Type: Public

Construction
- Built: 1874-1875
- Opened: September 18, 1875
- Closed: 2002
- Reopened: October, 2015
- Rebuilt: 1915 (interior)
- Architect: Agustín Ortiz de Villajos; Luis Bellido (interior reconstruction)

Website
- https://teatroclasico.inaem.gob.es/

The Teatro de la Comedia (Comedy Theater) is a theater in Madrid, inaugurated on Calle del Príncipe in 1875 and rebuilt in 1915 after a devastating fire. In 1986 it was designated the headquarters of the National Classical Theater Company and in 1999 it was acquired by said company, along with five other floors of the same building, by the Spanish Ministry of Culture.

In October 2015, after being closed for thirteen years for renovation work, it reopened with a performance of The Mayor of Zalamea. After this renovation, the hall has six hundred and thirty seats; in addition, it has a new hall with one hundred seats, called "Tirso de Molina".

== History ==
The theater was started construction in 1874 by the Manchego architect Agustín Ortiz de Villajos, at the request of the businessman Silverio López de Larrainza, who worked in the gambling industry. The architect did not design dressing rooms, believing that the actors would come from their homes already in costume. Upon discovering this mistake, it became necessary to purchase the property behind the theater for adaptation. The lighting was gas-powered, as there was still no electricity in Madrid at that time.

The inauguration took place on September 18, 1875, with the presence of King Alfonso XII. A three-act play, Me voy de Madrid, by Bretón de los Herreros, was staged; and a one-act play, Ayer y hoy, by Diego Luque and last, a performance of the play The Full-Length Mirror, starring Emilio Mario. In 1888, the theater began using electric power. The façade was renovated in 1897 by the architect Francisco Andrés Octavio. And in 1899, the theater was sold to a lawyer from La Rioja, Tirso Escudero.

On March 23, 1914, a lecture by José Ortega y Gasset entitled "Old and New Politics" took place in the theater, serving as the presentation of the League for Political Education. On April 16/18, 1915, a fire destroyed the roof and interior of the building. The architect Luis Bellido was hired for the reconstruction. Bellido used reinforced concrete, increased the number of staircases, and built a lobby and cafeteria. It was reopened on December 22, 1915, with the play La propia estimación, by Jacinto Benavente.

Between December 10 and 18, 1919, a congress of the National Confederation of Labor (CNT) was held, in which the organization's provisional adherence to the Communist International was decided. On October 29, 1933, José Antonio Primo de Rivera delivered the founding speech of the Falange Española, in which he established the foundations of his political ideology of Falangism.

In 1970, the show Castañuela 70, a popular experiment in independent theater in Spain, was performed at this theater with unprecedented critical and public success from August 21 to September 27: 74 performances and 51,833 spectators. After repeated threats and the final assault by several groups of far-right thugs disguised as left-wing agitators, it was banned "for disturbing public order" on September 28, 1970. Later in the decade, and with the Spanish transition to democracy completed, the theater management alternated all kinds of genres, even presenting the premiere of the Spanish version of the musical Cabaret.

In 1986, the theater was rented to the National Institute of Performing Arts and Music (INAEM) to serve as the headquarters of the National Classical Theater Company. The property was owned by the Escudero family until 1998, when it was sold to the State; and became the permanent headquarters of the National Company.

In 2002, following a production of La dama boba, the theatre was closed for safety because it had not undergone any renovations since its inauguration. They began expansions in the interior of the building, which did not begin until 2009, under the supervision of architects Araújo and Nadal, at a cost of 15,240,544 euros, financed by the Ministry of Culture; it reopened in 2015 with a performance of the play The Mayor of Zalamea, by Calderón.

== Architecture ==
The auditorium is Italian-styled (with a horseshoe-shaped layout) and has four side staircases leading to the upper floors. The decoration is Arabic styled, in white and gold colors; and the seats are upholstered in red velvet. The upper floors have cast-iron railings and Arabic arches. There is a lobby, a snack bar, and a room for performances and rehearsals.
