= Alfonso García Valdecasas =

Spanish professor of civil law, lawyer and politician

Alfonso García-Valdecasas
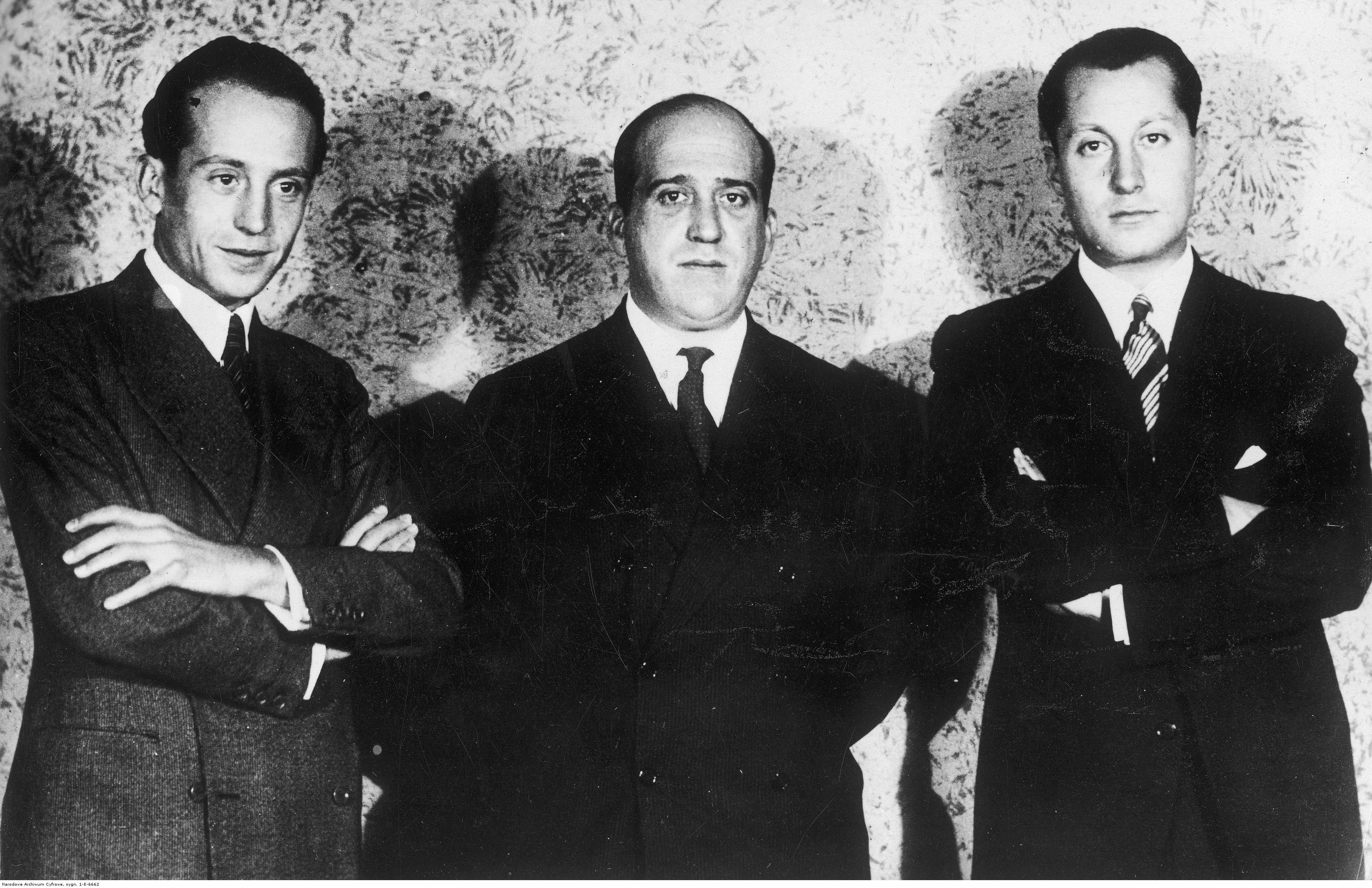
- Alfonso García-Valdecasas, Julio Ruiz de Alda, and José Antonio Primo de Rivera after the founding of the Falange, 1933.
- Born: Alfonso García-Valdecasas y García-Valdecasas; 14 May 1904; Montefrio, Spain
- Died: 11 April 1993 (aged 88); Madrid, Spain
- Political party: Falange Española, FET y de las JONS

Seat U of the Real Academia Española
- In office 25 April 1965 – 11 April 1993
- Preceded by: Leopoldo Eijo y Garay
- Succeeded by: Eduardo García de Enterría

Alfonso García-Valdecasas y García-Valdecasas (14 May 1904 – 11 April 1993) was a Spanish professor of civil law, lawyer, politician, and founding member of the Falange Española.

== Biography ==
Alfonso García-Valdecasas was born on 14 May 1904 in Montefrio, Granada. He obtained a doctorate of law from the University of Bologna in 1925, and became a chair at the university. Together with Fernando de los Ríos, Luis Jiménez de Asúa, Felipe Sánchez-Román Gallifa, Wenceslao Roces and José Ortega y Gasset, García-Valdecasas resigned from his position as chair in 1929 in protest due to Spanish leader Miguel Primo de Rivera's persecution of student politicians.

In 1931, García-Valdecasas joined the parliamentary group known as Agrupación al Servicio de la República ("The Grouping at the Service of the Republic"), an organization of intellectuals created by José Ortega y Gasset to support Spanish Republican politicians. He was soon elected as deputy of the Granada constituency in the 1931 Spanish general election. He was secretary of the parliamentary commission involved in drafting the Spanish Constitution of 1931.

In 1932, he left the Agrupación al Servicio de la República to create the Frente Español (Spanish Front) alongside José Antonio Maravall, Antonio Garrigues Díaz-Cañabate, María Zambrano, Antonio Sacristán Colás, Salvador Lissarrague Novoa, Antonio Bouthelier Espasa, Eliseo García del Moral y Bujalarce and Antonio Riaño Lanzarote. He later became involved with the Movimiento Español Sindicalista (Spanish Syndicalist Movement, or MES).

By March 1933, García-Valdecasas began to collaborate with José Antonio Primo de Rivera, a lawyer and the eldest son of Miguel Primo de Rivera, and the two became founding members of the Falange Española alongside Julio Ruiz de Alda. The Falange Española was a fascist successor group that split from the Movimiento Español Sindicalista. García-Valdecasas participated as a speaker at the founding ceremony of the Falange, which was held on 29 October 1933 at the Teatro de la Comedia in Madrid. García-Valdecasas ran under the banner of the Falange in their first election, and was appointed a member of the Comité de Mando de Falange (Falange Command Committee), alongside cofounders Ruiz de Alda and Primo de Rivera. In November 1933, he ran as a candidate for the right-wing Bloque de Derechas coalition in Granada, but was replaced by Ramón Ruiz Alonso. He soon retired from parliamentary politics but remained a member of the Falange.

After the breakout of the Spanish Civil War, García-Valdecasas joined the Francoist side, and in 1938 he was appointed Undersecretary of Education by Francisco Franco. Between 1939 and 1943 he served as the first president of the Institute for Political Studies, an organ of the Falange Española Tradicionalista y de las Juntas de Ofensiva Nacional Sindicalista (FET y de las JONS), successor to the Falange Española and ruling party of Spain. In 1944, he was removed from his position due to his defence of Juan de Borbón, count of Barcelona. He then became an attorney in the Cortes Españolas from 1943 to 1946, and again from 1967 to 1971, and from 1971 to 1977.

García-Valdecasa was a member of the Royal Academy of Jurisprudence and Legislation (elected on 29 July 1939), the Real Academia de Ciencias Morales y Políticas (Royal Academy of Moral and Political Sciences, elected 1953), and the Royal Spanish Academy (from 25 April 1965). He died in Madrid on 11 April 1993 at the age of 88.
