= Falange Española =

Spanish political organization

Spanish Phalanx Falange Española
- Abbreviation: FE
- Leader: José Antonio Primo de Rivera
- Founded: 29 October 1933
- Dissolved: 15 February 1934
- Preceded by: Movimiento Español Sindicalista
- Merged into: Falange Española de las JONS
- Newspaper: FE (magazine)
- Student wing: Sindicato Español Universitario
- Membership: 25,000
- Ideology: Falangism; National Syndicalism; Spanish irredentism; Spanish nationalism; Panhispanism; Fascism
- Political position: Syncretic
- Religion: Roman Catholicism

Falange Española (FE) was a Spanish fascist and national syndicalist political organization active from 1933 to 1934. Its name translates to "Spanish Phalanx." Founded on October 29, 1933, by Alfonso García Valdecasas, Julio Ruiz de Alda, and José Antonio Primo de Rivera, the eldest son of the deceased dictator Miguel Primo de Rivera. On February 15, 1934, FE merged with the Juntas de Ofensiva Nacional-Sindicalista (JONS), founded by Onésimo Redondo and Ramiro Ledesma Ramos, among others. The new party was called Falange Española de las JONS (FE de las JONS).

Following the success of Italian fascism with Benito Mussolini's March on Rome in 1922, various attempts to create a fascist organization in Spain along Italian lines failed. Organizations like the Comunión Tradicionalist, Acción Popular, and Renovación Española already existed but those organizations were never fascist and only minor fractions in those organizations would be. In those years, the Spanish fascists and the most reactionary financial and business sectors felt the need for a fascist party, which had proven to be an effective check on the development of left-wing mass movements in Europe. With the establishment of the Second Republic and the initiation of the democratization of Spain, the first attempts crystallized in the Falange Española, promoted by these reactionary sectors.

Hitler's triumph and the limited presence of Spain's main fascist party, the Juntas de Ofensiva Nacional-Sindicalista (JONS) of Ramiro Ledesma Ramos and Onésimo Redondo, led the Spanish far right, represented by industrial and financial businessmen, to begin searching in 1933 for a charismatic leader for Spanish fascism. They found him in José Antonio Primo de Rivera, son of the previous dictator, who already held conservative and authoritarian positions. The Falange Española held its first rally in the Teatro de la Comedia in Madrid on October 29, 1933.

During the Second Republic, it played an important role in the events leading up to the Spanish Civil War. It was founded with the support of reactionary forces and right-wing parties who used it as a shock force. It did not achieve significant popular support, but its frequent raids and clashes with the most radical left-wing groups, mainly youth organizations, its violent acts and assassinations contributed to creating a climate of insecurity and violence conducive to military uprisings.

== Ideology ==
"The Falange Espanola de las JONS demands a new order, as set forth in

the foregoing principles. In the face of the resistance from the present order, it calls for a revolution to implant this new order. Its method of procedure will be direct, bold, and combative. Life signifies the art and science of warfare (milicia) and must be lived with a spirit that is

purified by service and sacrifice."

— José Antonio Primo de Rivera, Twenty-sixth point of the Twenty-Seven Point Program of the Falange.

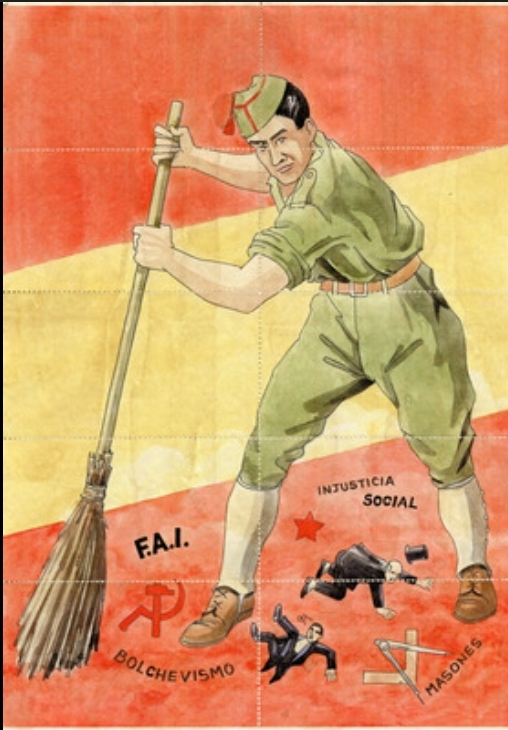
Falangist militant cleaning up Bolsheviks, Freemasons and social injustice.

The ideology of the Falange was centered around national syndicalism. It was a mix of classical fascism, national Catholicism, syndicalism and corporatism. José Antonio Primo de Rivera and Rafael Sánchez Mazas, its founders, were interested in classical fascism and in the early days did not object to the use of the label "fascist." According to the conservative American historian Stanley Payne, the Falange did not differ fundamentally from the Italian Fascist Party, sometimes even using its rhetoric. However, Falangism did have its own distinctive features, among which are the focus on workers rights, the enforcement of Catholic beliefs, values and the cooperation of church and state, and tamer but still prevalent ultranationalism.

"Our Movement incorporates the Catholic meaning- of glorious tradition, and especially in Spain of national reconstruction. The church and state will co-ordinate their respective powers so as to permit no interference or activity that may impair the dignity of State or national integrity." - José Antonio. The unity of Spain is also stated in the second programmatic point: "Spain is a unity of destiny in the universal." And to the imperialism characteristic of other fascist movements, stated in point three ("We have the will to empire… We claim for Spain a preeminent place in Europe"), it adds a pan-Hispanic character: "With respect to the countries of Hispanic America, we tend towards the unification of culture, economic interests and power." Unlike other fascist movements, and despite its rhetoric, the Falange did not seek a "New State" and a "new man," but rather that these would be a consequence of Catholic traditionalism.

The Falange were militarist in that they wanted a strong military to ensure Spanish independence and Spanish status in the world as a whole. A part of the plan was to ensure militarism in the hearts and minds of the common Spaniard in every aspect of life. José Antonio wanted the expansion and better quality of the Spanish to ascend Spain as a maritime power for defense and commerce. Spain was to be equal with other maritime powers.

Like most fascist or para-fascist movements at the time, José Antonio wanted Spain to be united in one. With no political parties and the abolishment of the Cortes. But, he still defended human dignity, integrity and freedom as intangible rights. In which those freedoms shouldn't conflict with the unity of Spain. Since as he said "But one is not really free unless he is a part of a strong and free nation." He hoped that discipline would prevent the disunity of Spain from the inside.

José Antonio wanted a patriotic, and disciplined education for Spanish children. Which would prepare them to get paramilitary training to be enlisted in the Spanish military. On the other hand, he wanted to eliminate insufficient spending in the education system for higher learning.

=== Economic and Land Policy ===
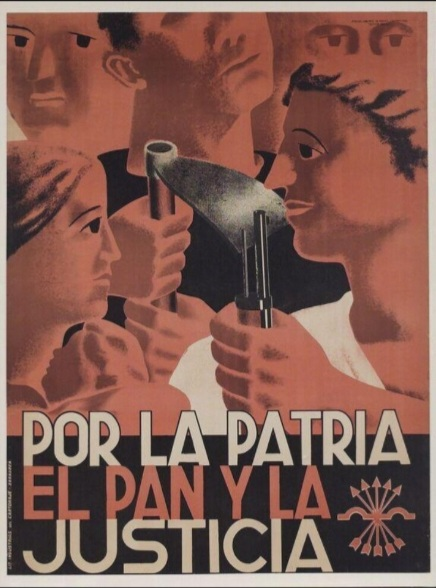
Falangist propaganda poster with the words "For the Fatherland, Bread, and Justice."

The Falange advocated the creation of a totalitarian Syndicalist State which would group employers and workers organized by branches of production into a single body, similar to corporatism. It also advocated the removal of the capitalist-style economy alongside wealth inequality, class struggle, the right and duty to work and the gradual nationalization of banking while still allowing and defending private property and private initiative of the individual. They were strongly against Marxism as they saw it to be against their "spiritual and national conception of life." Ownership of the means of production would be syndicated and organized cooperatively through vertical syndicates to make economic cooperation more efficient.

The Falangists proposed for the raise of the standard of living in Spain's breadbasket, the countryside without economic or social disruption.

They wanted to achieve this through a minimum wage, the endowment of the countryside, low interest loans and property guarantees for agrarian producers, the education of better farming or animal raising methods, the use of land by their suitability and their economic possibilities, protectionist tariffs, land and agriculture reclamation, they wished to achieve this by the redistribution of land and the syndicalization of labor. They then wanted to campaign and enforce reforestation and animal breeding which would be supported by the Spanish youth. The state also may take land away from owners if the land was being exploited.

== History ==
In 1933, José Antonio Primo de Rivera began to take an interest in national syndicalism. In February, together with Manuel Delgado Barreto (a former collaborator of his father), director of the conservative newspaper La Nación, they launched the newspaper El Fascio. Rafael Sánchez Mazas and Juan Aparicio López joined the effort. Only one issue of El Fascio was ever printed, and a large number of copies were confiscated by the police. Primo de Rivera himself contributed articles to that issue (signing the article "Orientations for a New State" under the initial "E" for Marqués de Estella) and Ramiro Ledesma. The newspaper also included extensive articles on Mussolini and Hitler. Despite the failure, the group continued to meet, and Julio Ruiz de Alda and Alfonso García Valdecasas soon joined them. Together they formed the Spanish Syndicalist Movement, whose propaganda included the subtitle Spanish Fascism (FE).

In August, through the mediation of the Basque far-right activist José María de Areilza, the leadership of MES-FE met with Ramiro Ledesma to secure his support. No agreement was reached, as Ramiro Ledesma only considered the possibility of the new group joining the JONS. In October, José Antonio Primo de Rivera traveled to Fascist Italy, where he met with the dictator Mussolini and visited the headquarters of the National Fascist Party, with the aim of obtaining advice and information for organizing a similar movement in Spain.

On Sunday, October 29, the formal founding of the Falange took place at the Teatro de la Comedia in Madrid. In his founding speech, Primo de Rivera said, among other things:

The Fatherland is a total unity in which all individuals and all classes are integrated; the Fatherland cannot be in the hands of the strongest class or the best-organized party. The Fatherland is a transcendent synthesis, an indivisible synthesis, with its own purposes to fulfill; and what we want is for the movement of this day, and the State it creates, to be the effective, authoritative instrument at the service of that irrevocable unity called Fatherland.[...]

Let political parties disappear. No one is ever born a member of a political party; instead, we are all born members of a family; we are all residents of a municipality; we all strive in the performance of a job...[...]

If our objectives must in any case be achieved by violence, let us not stop at violence. [...] Dialectic is fine as a primary instrument of communication, but there is no admissible dialectic other than the dialectic of fists and pistols when justice and the Fatherland are offended.

— José Antonio Primo de Rivera

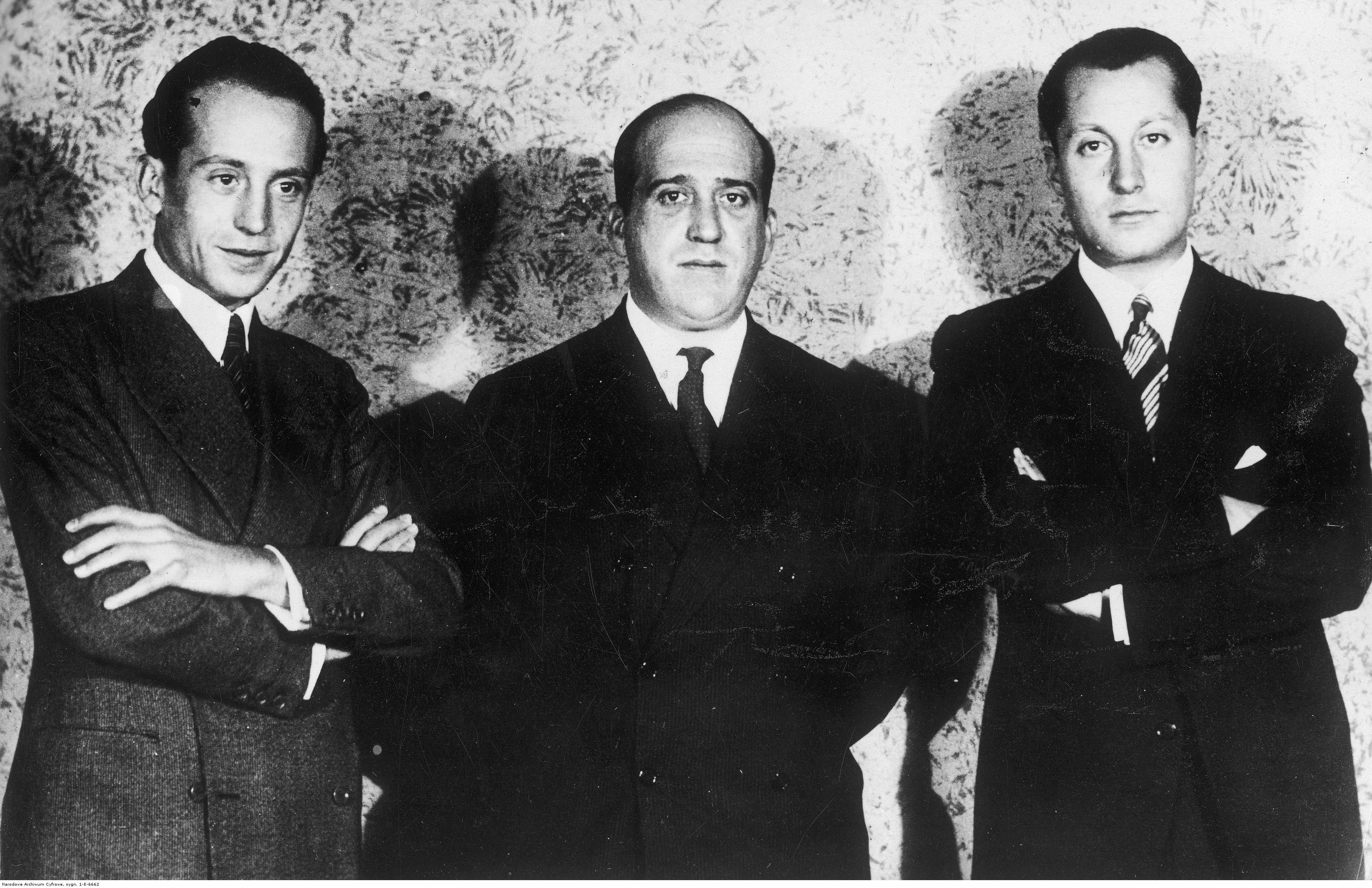
Alfonso García Valdecasas (middle), Ruiz de Alda (left) and Primo de Rivera (right) in the 1933 foundational meeting.

In the following months, the Falange vied with the JONS for what little fascism could muster. The JONS ceased receiving the meager contributions it had received from financial sectors, which now, along with the monarchists, opted to finance the Falange. The Falange, with greater room to maneuver, capitalized on the influx of new members, quickly surpassing the JONS in membership. Ramiro Ledesma, without the support of the financial oligarchy, faced pressure to merge with the new Falange. On February 11, 1934, the National Council of the JONS met to consider a possible merger with the Falange, and on February 15, with the approval of the National Council, an agreement was reached with the Falange. According to this agreement, the new formation would be called Falange Española de las JONS and would be led by a triumvirate: two members of the Falange: Primo de Rivera and Ruiz de Alda; and one of the JONS: Ramiro Ledesma.

The Falange's electoral results during the Second Republic were consistently very poor. This lack of success was due to several reasons, including the absence of a deeply rooted nationalism in Spain. On the contrary, there were strong peripheral nationalist sentiments (for example, Catalan, Basque, and Galician nationalisms), which deprived the fascist ideology, based primarily on ultranationalism, of its main advantage. Other contributing factors included the limited secularization of Spanish society and the success of other right-wing forces such as the CEDA. In April 1934, the socialist Luis Araquistáin published an article in the American newspaper Foreign Affairs analyzing the limited prospects for fascism in Spain:

Fascism of the Italian or German type cannot arise in Spain. There is no demobilized army like in Italy; there are no hundreds of thousands of university graduates without a future, nor millions of unemployed like in Germany. There is no Mussolini, not even a Hitler; there are no imperialist ambitions, no feelings of revenge, no problems of expansion, not even the Jewish question. From what ingredients could Spanish fascism be obtained? I cannot imagine the recipe.

— Luis Araquistáin

Nor did they achieve financial stability. Although, in principle, they received more support from large financiers and landowners than the JONS, this was insufficient until 1935 when they were subsidized monthly with 50,000 lira by the Italian government. This subsidy was halved and subsequently withdrawn after the poor electoral results of 1936. Even the National Syndicalist doctrine failed to attract workers, who were organized into the major class-based unions (UGT and CNT). During this period, they did not manage to have any representatives in the Cortes, since although José Antonio Primo de Rivera won a seat in the November 1933 elections, he did so through a conservative candidacy from Cádiz, called the Agrarian Trade Union Federation.

=== Violence during the Republic ===
During the Second Republic, youth organizations were characterized by their violent nature. Left-wing youth groups proclaimed themselves revolutionary, while right-wing youth groups were anti-liberal. Clashes between the two were frequent. Both groups, escaping the control of their respective parties, openly contradicted the parties' activities in the Cortes. The situation in the workplace was no better; workers' organizations faced groups of gunmen in the service of employers' interests. It was in this context that the Falange Española emerged, with the practice of violence as part of its ideology.

Like other fascist movements, FE placed special emphasis on recruiting young people into its ranks, organizing them into a paramilitary structure and channeling their rebellion into the methodical and organized practice of political violence. Membership forms included a box indicating whether the applicant possessed a "bicycle ," a euphemism for a pistol, and flexible, metal-coated batons were issued. In January 1934, the republican newspaper La Voz published an internal document theorizing about violence and providing precise instructions on how to wield it:

Having utterly failed attempts at legal action, and being powerless today to contain the advance of the red wave, whose practices and procedures are genuinely violent, violence will have to be used to contain and then destroy this danger that seeks to end civilization.

The raids must be perfectly planned in advance, down to the smallest detail, and carried out by trusted individuals… Their targets are everywhere: in the street and indoors, day and night, people or things, and they are so effective that, carried out with precision and audacity, they can resolve very difficult situations […]

Mass struggle: […] Its method of employment is all-out struggle, and it is preceded by provocation, although surprise is sometimes also employed. The force that carries it out is, at a minimum, the Falange (made up of 33 individuals: three 'squads' composed of 9 members, a leader and a deputy leader), a unit suited to this type of action, since it alone brings all the necessary combat resources.

Execution of the fight: Divided into squads and in close contact between individuals of each of them, so that no one is ever isolated, they will distribute themselves strategically, trying to surround the enemy and, at an agreed signal from the leader of the phalanx, they will act with the greatest violence…

The militias known as the Falange of Blood (Falange de Sangre), (later renamed Primera Línea) were initially led by retired military officer Luis Arredondo. They began to provoke and engage in skirmishes. Street clashes and punitive operations ensued. The distribution of their publication, FE (FAITH), hawked by their own militants (newsstands had refused to distribute it under pressure from leftist organizations), led to the main flashpoints of confrontation. At the University of Madrid, the Falange created a student union, the Sindicato Español Universitario (Spanish University Syndicate; SEU), in opposition to the larger Federación Universitaria Escolar ("Academic University Federation; FUE), with the aim of "destroying" it. On January 25, 1934, one of these punitive operations was carried out against the FUE at the Faculty of Medicine, leaving one FUE member seriously wounded.

The first deaths occurred on the Falange side. On February 7, 1934, two weeks after the incident at the Faculty of Medicine, Matías Montero, a medical student and co-founder of the SEU (Spanish University Syndicate), became the first martyr of Falangism as he was shot dead as he returned home after distributing FE (FAITH). His death will be commemorated as "the Day of the Fallen Student" during Franco's rule of Spain. Throughout 1934, continuous attacks took place, especially against members, sympathizers, and premises of the Falange and the right-wing Acción Popular (Popular Action), as reported in the newspapers of the time.

Due to the Falange's rhetoric, it was expected that this death would be avenged, which did not happen. The media began to satirize the fascist character of the Falange. Wenceslao Fernández Flórez called them Franciscans, not fascists. In the pages of ABC, the writer Álvaro Alcalá-Galiano asked, "Where are the mysterious fascist legions?" The Falange Española (FE) was called the Spanish Funeral Home, and Primo de Rivera, Juan Simón the Gravedigger. The FE responded to these criticisms: "The Spanish Falange will accept and engage in combat on whatever terrain suits it. The Spanish Falange is in no way like a criminal organization, nor does it intend to copy the methods of such organizations, no matter how many unofficial encouragements it receives."

In late February and early March, another Falangist militant was murdered in Valladolid, another in Gijón, and a third in Madrid. These deaths coincided with the dismissal of Arredondo as head of the Falange de Sangre (Blood Falange), who was replaced by the aviator Juan Antonio Ansaldo, who began to reorganize the paramilitary as he saw fit. The Falangists took weeks to respond forcefully to these attacks this was not because the leaders of FE favored a policy of appeasement in the face of pressure from workers' organizations, but because of the Falange's own shortcomings. From within the Falange ranks, there were protests about the inaction in the face of the bloodshed that was taking place. The leader of the JONS (National Syndicalist Offensive Juntas) Ramiro Ledesma, joined in the criticism:

It so happened that FE's presence was marked by excessive optimism and grandstanding. We must be more restrained in our use of the language of violence, especially when we cannot carry out our promises, or when there is almost certainty that the enemy will believe them literally.

From April onwards, with the merger of the JONS, the militias were strengthened by the incorporation of JONS members. They became more effective in their reprisals, also dedicating themselves to developing a tactic of terror against leftist organizations. The first fatality among the ranks of leftist groups occurred on June 10, 1934, when a FE de las JONS commando, in retaliation for the death that same day of one of their own, opened fire on a group of hikers from the Socialist Youth, killing the young Juanita Rico, incapacitating her younger brother, and wounding several others.

The activities of the Falange were hampered by frequent closures of its premises and the prohibition of many of its events due to the numerous violent incidents in which it was involved. Its militias did not hesitate to use teenagers in their actions, as demonstrated by the death of fifteen-year-old high school student Jesús Hernández in an armed confrontation. A member of the SEU (Spanish University Syndicate), it was shown that, like his peers, he carried pistols.

On June 16, 1934, another teenage Falangist, 16-year-old Antonio Castillo, died while playing with his weapon in the early hours of the morning while on guard duty at the headquarters on Marqués de Riscal Street in Madrid.

== See also ==
- Falange Española de las JONS
- Juntas de Ofensiva Nacional-Sindicalista
- Falange Española Tradicionalista y de las Juntas de Ofensiva Nacional Sindicalista
- Falange Auténtica
- Falange Española Independiente
- National syndicalism

== Bibliography ==
- Payne, Stanley (1999). Fascism in Spain, (1923-1977). University of Wisconsin Press. ISBN 0-299-16564-7.
- Albanese, Matteo; Hierro, Pablo del (2016). Transnational Fascism in the Twentieth Century: Spain, Italy and the Global Neo-Fascist Network. Bloomsbury Publishing. ISBN 978-1-4725-2250-4.
- Box, Zira; Saz, Ismael (2011). "Spanish Fascism as a Political Religion (1931–1941)". Politics, Religion & Ideology. 12 (4). Taylor & Francis: 371–389. doi:10.1080/21567689.2011.624408. ISSN 2156-7697. S2CID 143784445.
- González Calleja, Eduardo (2011). Contrarrevolucionarios. Radicalización violenta de las derechas durante la Segunda República, 1931–1936. Madrid: Alianza Editorial. ISBN 978-84-206-6455-2.
- Slaven, James (2018). "The Falange Española: A Spanish Paradox". Proceedings of the 10th International RAIS Conference on Social Sciences and Humanities. 211. Atlantis Press: 235–242. doi:10.2139/ssrn.3266916. ISSN 2352-5398. Archived from the original on 2020-03-23.
- Winkler, Heinrich August (2015) [2011]. The Age of Catastrophe: A History of the West, 1914–1945. New Haven & London: Yale University Press. ISBN 978-0300-20489-6.
