= Sindicato Español Universitario =

Corporatist students' union in Spain

Spanish University Syndicate
- Sindicato Español Universitario
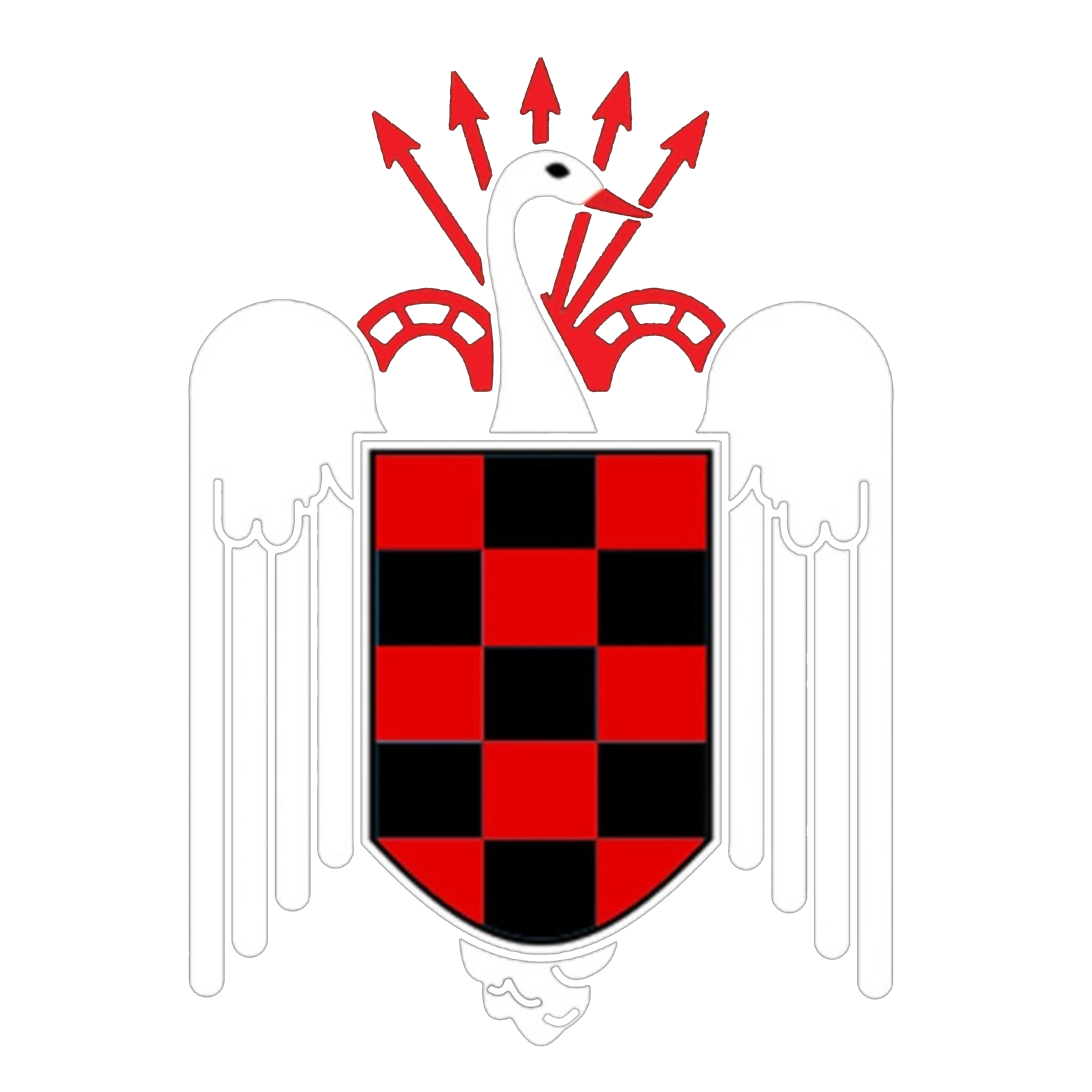
- Formation: 21 November 1933
- Founder: Agustín Aznar, Manuel Valdés Larrañaga, José Miguel Guitarte, Heliodoro Fernández Canepa, Matías Montero
- Dissolved: 5 April 1965
- Type: Student organization
- Purpose: Student activism
- Headquarters: Madrid
- Location: Spain
- Region served: National
- Members: 500 (1933); 2,300 (1934); 9,700 (1936); 46,569 (1940)
- Official language: Spanish

The Sindicato Español Universitario ("Spanish University Syndicate"; SEU) was a corporatist students' union in Spain, created in the 1930s during the Second Spanish Republic, by the Falange Española (later the Falange Española de las JONS) under the leadership of José Antonio Primo de Rivera. The SEU was inspired by students' unions linked to contemporary fascist parties of Italy and Romania.

It was founded with the aim of crushing the then prevalent Federación Universitaria Escolar ("Academic University Federation"; FUE) and to introduce Falangist propaganda in the university circles.

At the end of the Spanish Civil War in 1939, the SEU was proclaimed the sole legal student organization by the Francoist regime, now as part of the FET y de las JONS (following the 1937 Unification Decree). Although all students were formally required to be members, it never succeeded in gaining a foothold in universities across the country, and by the mid-1960s democratically oriented students began to autonomously organize themselves in clandestine organizations, particularly in Catalonia. In 1965, it was practically dismantled by the regime following its infiltration by an underground anti-Francoist group, the Federación Universitaria Democrática Española ("Spanish Democratic University Federation"; FUDE), which had succeeded in obtaining representatives on most university councils.

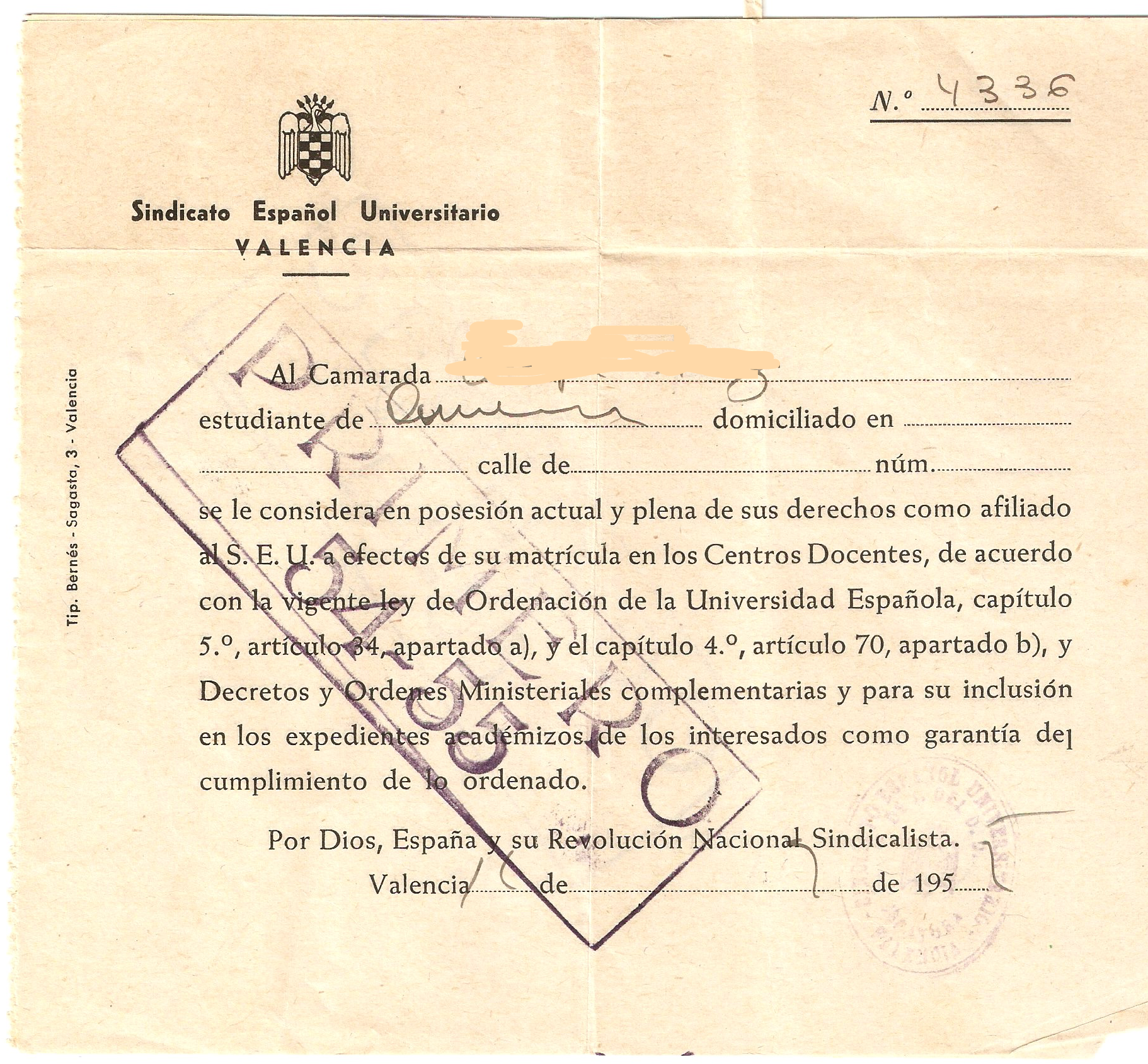
SEU certificate of affiliation (1955)

After 1965, the SEU disappeared from university life and was reorganized in 1977 within the Falangist party. The later splits gave rise to various regroupings which still claimed the historical union.

== Bibliography ==
- Campuzano, Francisco (2011). PUF (ed.). La transition espagnole, entre réforme et rupture (1975–1986) (in French) (1 ed.). Paris: Presses universitaires de France. p. 180. ISBN 978-2-13-059119-1.
- Ruiz Carnicer, Miguel Ángel (1996). El SEU 1939–1965. La socialización política de la juventud universitaria en el franquismo (in Spanish). Madrid: Siglo XXI de España Editores. ISBN 84-323-0924-9.
- Casassas, Jordi; Santacana, Carles (2004). Le Nationalisme catalan. Les essentiels de civilisation espagnole (in French). Translated by Paul Aubert. Paris: Ellipses (maison d'édition). p. 207. ISBN 2-7298-0786-1.
