= Ismael Saz =

Spanish historian

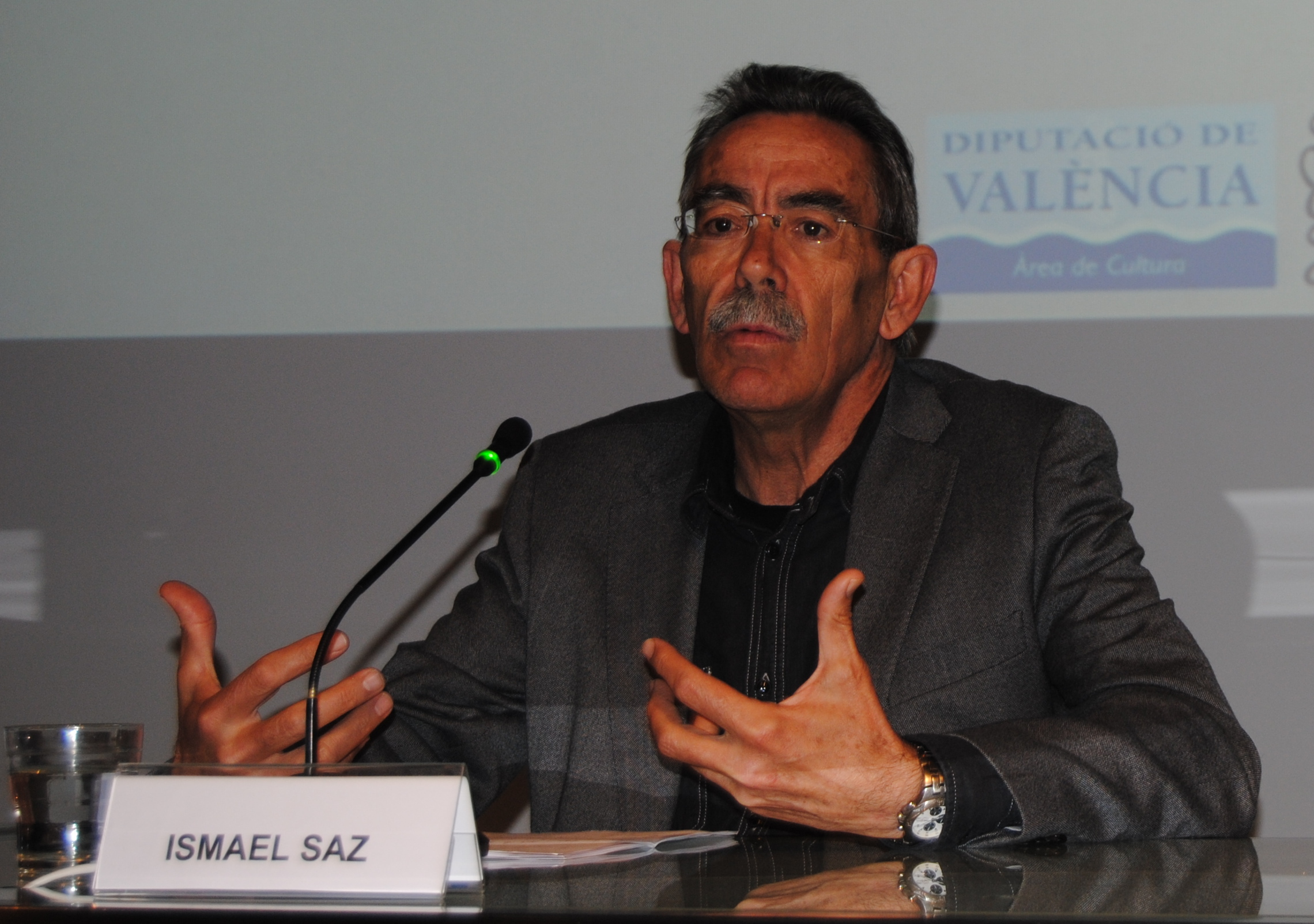
- Born: 1952 (age 73–74); Valencia

Academic background
- Education: University of Valencia

Academic work
- Discipline: history
- Institutions: University of Valencia
- Main interests: Falangism; Francoist Spain; Spanish Civil War
- Notable works: España contra España: los nacionalismos franquistas

Ismael Saz Campos (born 1952) is a Spanish historian, specialised in the study of Falangism, Francoist Spain and the Spanish-Italian relations during the Spanish Civil War. He is a professor at the University of Valencia.

== Biography ==
He was born in 1952 in Valencia. He earned a PhD at the University of Valencia (UV) in 1986. His dissertation dealt with the understanding of the Italian-Spanish relations until the Italian intervention in the Spanish Civil War.

Saz, who has conceptualised the Francoist regime as a "fascistised dictatorship", has posed in his work the struggle between Fascist and National-Catholic nationalisms within the regime. Full professor of the UV, he was appointed to a Chair of Contemporary History in 2002.

== Works ==
Author

- — (1986). Mussolini contra la II República: hostilidad, conspiraciones, intervención (1931-1936). Valencia.
- — (2003). España contra España: los nacionalismos franquistas. Marcial Pons.
- — (2004). Fascismo y franquismo. Valencia: Publicacions de la Universitat de València.
- — (2013). Las caras del franquismo. Granada: Editorial Comares.

Editor/Coordinator

- Archilés, Ferran; Saz, Ismael, eds. (2014). Naciones y Estado. La cuestión española. Valencia: Publicacions de la Universitat de València.
- Pérez Ledesma, Manuel; Saz, Ismael, eds. (2015). Del franquismo a la democracia 1936-2013. Zaragoza and Madrid: Prensas de la Universidad de Zaragoza & Marcial Pons Ediciones de Historia.
- Archilés, Ferran; Saz, Ismael; García Carrión, Marta, eds. (2013). Nación y nacionalización. Una perspectiva europea comparada. Valencia: Publicacions de la Universitat de València.
