= Rafael Sánchez Mazas =

Spanish nationalist writer (1894–1966)

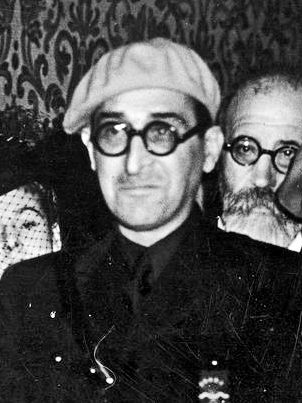
Rafael Sánchez Mazas in 1939.

Rafael Sánchez Mazas (18 February 1894 – October 1966) was a Spanish nationalist writer and a leader in the Falange, a far-right political movement created in Spain before the Spanish Civil War.

== Biography ==
Sánchez Mazas received a law degree at the Real Colegio de Estudios Superiores de María Cristina, El Escorial and in 1915 published Pequeñas memorias de Tarín. He then wrote for the magazine Hermes and the newspapers ABC, El Sol and El Pueblo Vasco. His work brought him to Morocco in 1921 (for El Pueblo Vasco) and Rome in 1922 (for ABC). He lived in Italy for seven years and married Liliana Ferlosio. While there he identified with the developing fascist movement.

Returning to Spain in 1929, he became an advisor for José Antonio Primo de Rivera, the main ideologist of the Falange. In 1933, he helped to create the weekly newspaper El Fascio, which was banned by the authorities after its second issue was published.

After the creation of Falange Española on 29 October 1933, Sánchez Mazas was appointed a member of the council, and he remained an active member up until the breakout of the Civil War (July 1936-April 1939). In February 1934, he wrote Oración por los muertos de Falange. He also co-wrote Cara al Sol, the anthem of Falange Española.

Sánchez Mazas was arrested and imprisoned in Madrid in March 1936, as the Falange was outlawed. He was given a short leave on the occasion of the birth of his fourth son, but he failed to report back and instead took up political asylum at the Chilean Embassy in Madrid. In 1937 he attempted to flee the country, but was arrested in Barcelona in November. Confined in the prison-ship Uruguay until 24 January 1939, he was taken for execution with about fifty other inmates to the Monastery of Santa Maria del Collell in Girona.

The execution was carried out on 30 January, but as the squad fired at the prisoners Sánchez Mazas leapt out of the group and escaped into the forest. A manhunt was organised and he was found hiding under some bushes shortly after. However, the Republican soldier who found him decided not to report him and spared his life. After a few days he joined the Nationalist lines.

As one of the camisas viejas (literally "old shirts", referring to Falangists from before the Civil War), Sánchez Mazas was appointed to Francisco Franco's cabinet of 8 August 1939 as a minister without portfolio and vice-president of the Junta Política.

When Spanish troops occupied internationally administered Tangier in June 1940, Sánchez Mazas made a speech stressing the Spanish character of the city. His addition of nationalist rhetoric to a politically delicate situation earned him a severe dressing down from Franco's brother-in-law and fellow minister, Ramón Serrano Suñer, who later claimed to have been so angry that he tried to punch Sánchez Mazas in the face.

In 1940, he was appointed a member of the Real Academia Española but failed to attend his inauguration ceremony.

His life story inspired Javier Cercas to write Soldados de Salamina, a novel published in 2001. A movie of the same name was directed by David Trueba. His sons Rafael Sánchez Ferlosio and Chicho Sánchez Ferlosio and his grandson Máximo Pradera are known artists.
