= Julio Ruiz de Alda =

Spanish aviator and politician

Julio Ruiz de Alda Miqueleiz
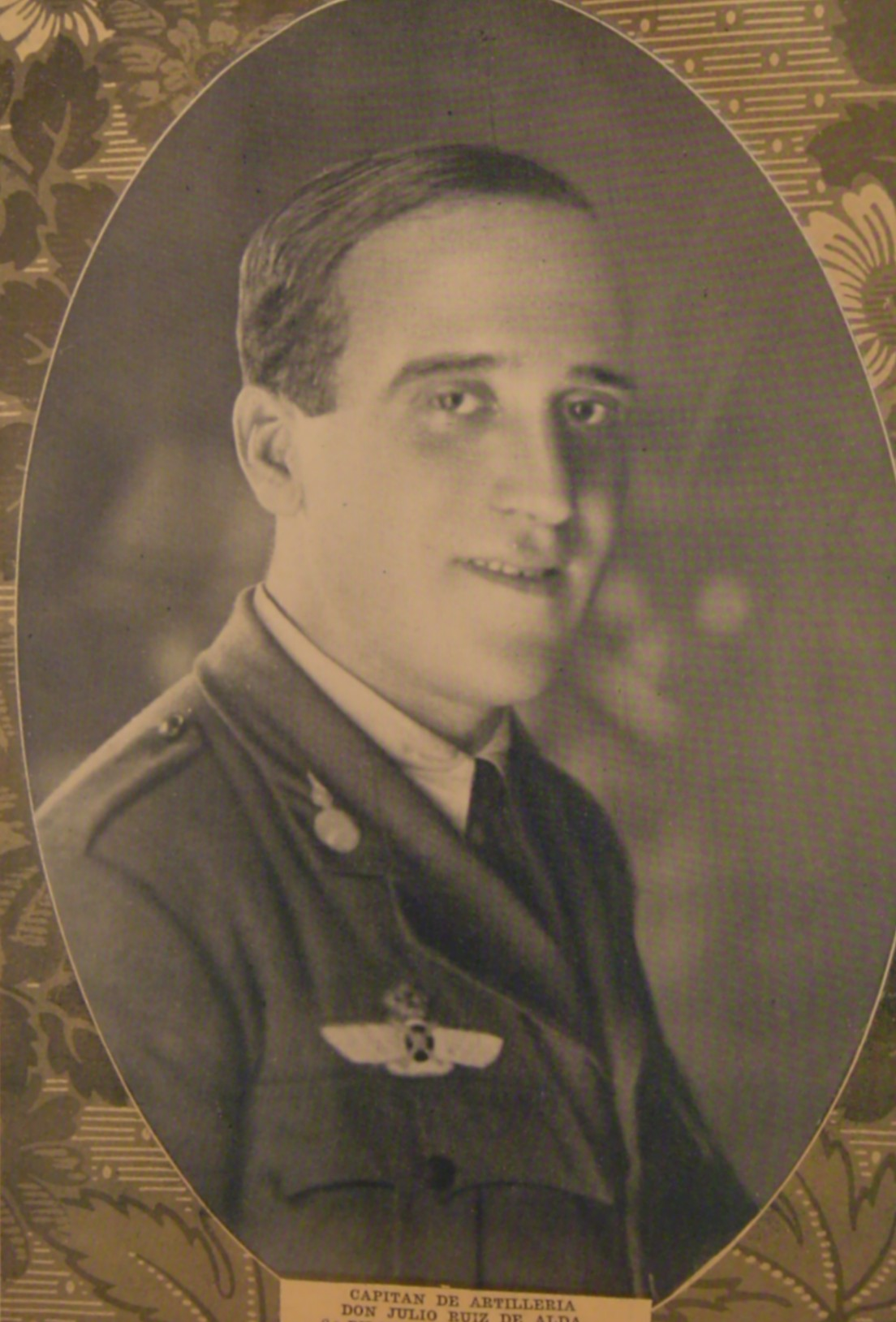
- Julio Ruiz de Alda Miqueleiz in 1926
- Born: 7 October 1897; Estella, Navarre, Kingdom of Spain
- Died: 23 August 1936 (aged 38); Cárcel Modelo, Madrid, Second Spanish Republic
- Cause of death: Execution by firing squad
- Military career
- Allegiance: Kingdom of Spain (1900–1931); Spanish Republic (1931–1936); Nationalist Spain (1936)
- Branch: Spanish Army
- Service years: 1913–1928
- Conflicts: Rif War, Spanish Civil War

Julio Ruiz de Alda Miqueleiz (7 October 1897 – 23 August 1936) was a Spanish aviator, and among the founders of the Falange.

He joined the Army at the age of 15 and developed an interest in planes. He was the co-pilot (with Ramón Franco) of the Plus Ultra as it completed a transatlantic flight in 1926. The Plus Ultra departed from Palos de la Frontera, in Huelva, Spain on 22 January and arrived in Buenos Aires, Argentina on 26 January. It stopped over at Gran Canaria, Cape Verde, Pernambuco, Rio de Janeiro and Montevideo. The 10,270 km journey was completed in 59 hours and 39 minutes.

In 1931, along with José Antonio Primo de Rivera (Marquess of his birthplace), he was a founding member of the Falange movement. He was shot without a trial by an anarchist militia in Madrid's Cárcel Modelo prison on 23 August 1936, after the beginning of the civil war the previous month.
