= José Antonio Primo de Rivera =

Spanish politician and founder of Falange Española (1903–1936)

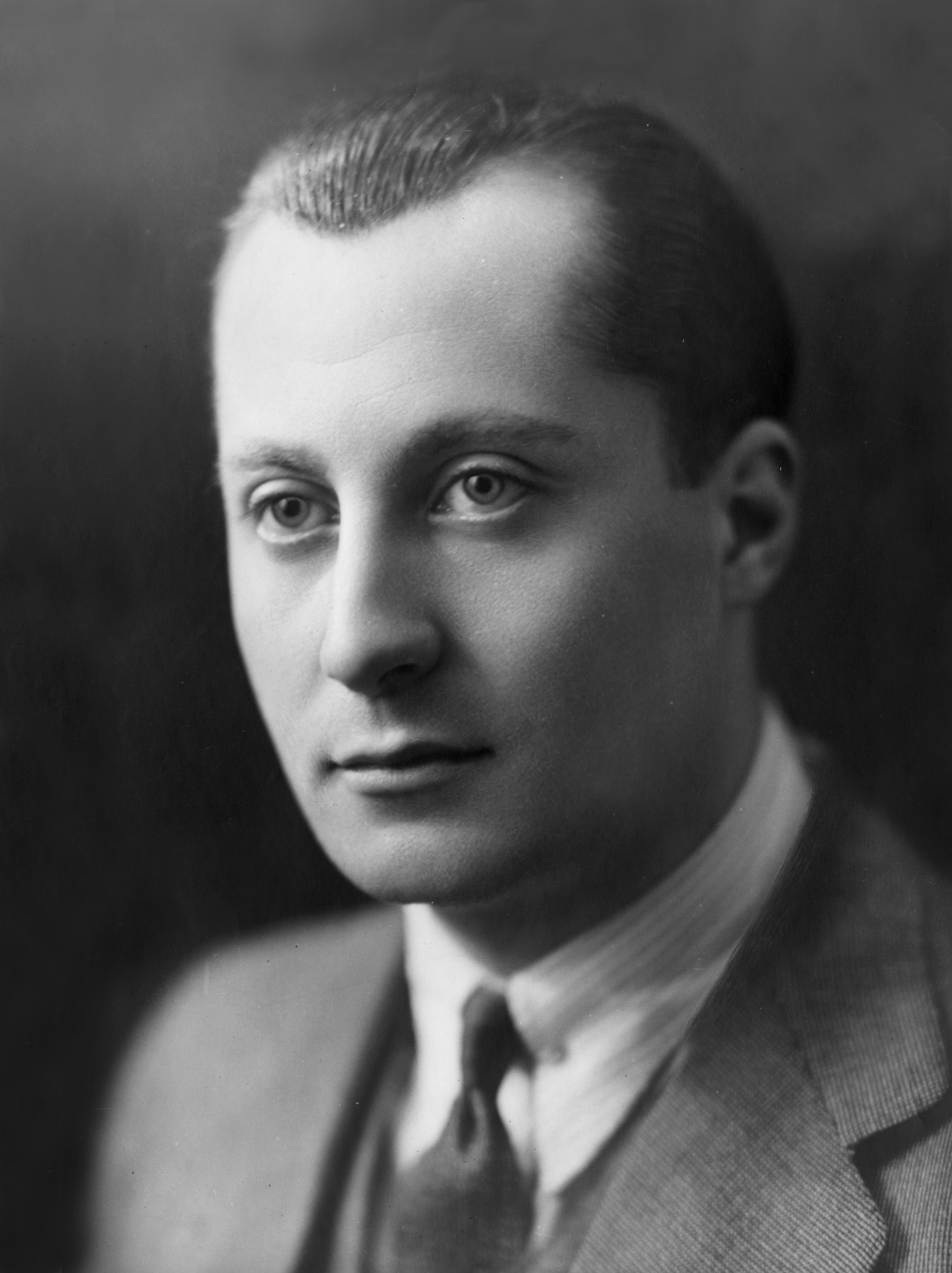
- Portrait of Primo De Rivera

Member of the Cortes
- In office 30 November 1933 – 7 January 1936
- Constituency: Cádiz

Personal details
- Born: José Antonio Primo de Rivera y Sáenz de Heredia; 24 April 1903 Madrid, Kingdom of Spain
- Died: 20 November 1936 (aged 33) Alicante, Spanish Republic
- Cause of death: Execution by firing squad
- Resting place: Saint Isidore Cemetery, Madrid (since 2023); Valley of the Fallen, San Lorenzo de El Escorial (1959–2023)
- Party: FE de las JONS (1934–1936); Falange Española (1933–1934); Movimiento Español Sindicalista (1933); National Monarchist Union (1930–1933)
- Parent: Miguel Primo de Rivera (father)
- Relatives: Miguel Primo de Rivera (brother); Pilar Primo de Rivera (sister)
- Education: University of Madrid
- Occupation: Lawyer; Politician

Military service
- Branch/service: Volunteer
- Years of service: 1923–1924
- Rank: Reserve second lieutenant
- Unit: Húsares de la Princesa

José Antonio Primo de Rivera y Sáenz de Heredia, 1st Duke of Primo de Rivera, 3rd Marquis of Estella GE (24 April 1903 – 20 November 1936), often referred to simply as José Antonio, was a Spanish national syndicalist politician who founded the Falange Española ("Spanish Phalanx"), later Falange Española de las JONS.

José Antonio was the eldest son of General Miguel Primo de Rivera (2nd Marquess of Estella), dictator of Spain from 1923 to 1930. He worked as a lawyer from 1927 to 1933 before entering politics through the National Monarchist Union, an enterprise he initially engaged in because of his vows to defend his recently deceased father's memory. After becoming disillusioned with the traditionalist monarchist policies, he founded the short lived Movimiento Español Sindicalista alongside Julio Ruiz de Alda. Soon after he founded Falange Española in October 1933, shortly before running as a candidate in the 1933 general election, in which he won a seat in the Congress of Deputies of the Second Spanish Republic. He assumed the role of messianic leader and charged himself with the task of saving Spain in founding a national syndicalist party, but he encountered difficulties widening his support base during his entire political life.

In 1936, he endorsed the Spanish nationalist military coup against the Second Spanish Republic that led to a civil war that he later attempted to stop. Imprisoned before the start of the war, he was accused of conspiracy and military rebellion against the government of the republic and was sentenced to death and executed by firing squad during the first months of the war.

In life, he held the nobiliary title of 3rd Marquis of Estella, Grandee of Spain. In 1948, he was posthumously given the title of Duke of Primo de Rivera, which was subsequently passed to his brother Miguel. The image of José Antonio was revered during the war by the Nationalist faction, and after the establishment of Francoist Spain he was regarded as a martyr, and used as a tool of the Francoist propaganda apparatus. The inscription of "José Antonio ¡Presente!" could be found in many churches all across Spain.

== Biography ==
=== Early life ===
José Antonio Primo de Rivera was born on Calle de Génova (Madrid) on April 24, 1903, the eldest son of the military officer Miguel Primo de Rivera y Orbaneja (who would later govern Spain as dictator from 1923 to 1930) and Casilda Sáenz de Heredia y Suárez de Argudín. From his father he inherited the title of Marquis of Estella. He never married.

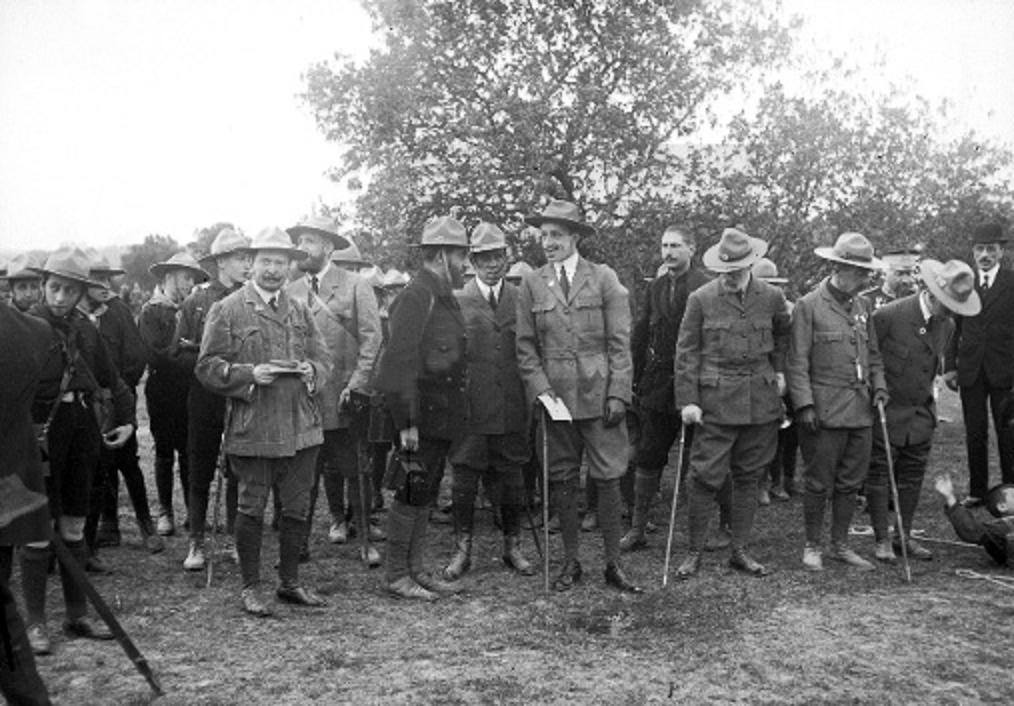
José Antonio Primo de Rivera can be seen at the left of the picture as member of the Boy Scouts during a visit of Alfonso XIII in 1918.

His mother died when he was five years old, and he was subsequently raised by his father's sister, Maria Jesus Primo de Rivera y Orbaneja. He was privately taught at home, and learned English and French. When at university, he did not attend lectures until the second year of his undergraduate studies. He spent his summer holidays at the country estate of an uncle, where he practiced horseriding and hunting.

Primo de Rivera went on to study law at the University of Madrid between 1917 and 1923. He helped to organize the student union there, Federación Universitaria Escolar, which opposed the higher-education policies of his father. He took undergraduate and graduate courses simultaneously and he obtained both his Bachelor and Doctor degrees in the same year, 1923.

After graduating, he chose the "One-Year Volunteer" option to do his military service while his father was dictator. He served with the Ninth Dragoons of St. James cavalry regiment, stationed at Barcelona. In 1930, he was court-martialed for punching a superior officer, the future Nationalist army leader, Brigadier General Gonzalo Queipo de Llano. The incident occurred at the Lyon d'Or café in the Calle Alcalá and resulted in Primo de Rivera being dishonourably discharged.

Queipo de Llano had written a defamatory letter against an uncle of José Antonio and against the Dictator himself. José Antonio, ready to defend the honour of his family abused by the Republican general, went to the café where the latter used to socialize, and after asking whether he was the author of the writing, and after receiving the general's affirmative reply, delivered a spectacular punch that made the general roll on the floor, sparking a free-for-all between the companions of José Antonio and the companions of the general.

Queipo de Llano had been a Republican in the time of the Rivera dictatorship, but is today remembered mostly as a notorious Francoist war criminal in the Civil War. At the time, it led to increased right-wing suspicions of Queipo de Llano.

Primo de Rivera became a registered lawyer in 1925, and opened an office on a side street of Madrid very near the confluence of three principal avenues.

A relatively successful lawyer not involved nor expected to be involved in politics before 1930, the José Antonio Primo de Rivera decided to do so after the death of his father in his Parisian self-exile in 1930; this was for him a way to defend the memory of his father, whose work at government had often been derided.

In February 1931, Primo de Rivera served as the witness for Ramón Serrano Suñer at his wedding with Ramona (Zita) Polo y Martínez-Valdés, Franco's sister-in-law.

In 1931, he was invested "Perpetual Dean of the Illustrious College of Lawyers of Madrid".

He ran for office under the banner of the National Monarchist Union but failed to get elected.

He was detained briefly in 1932 for collaboration in General José Sanjurjo's attempted coup.

=== Falangist leader ===
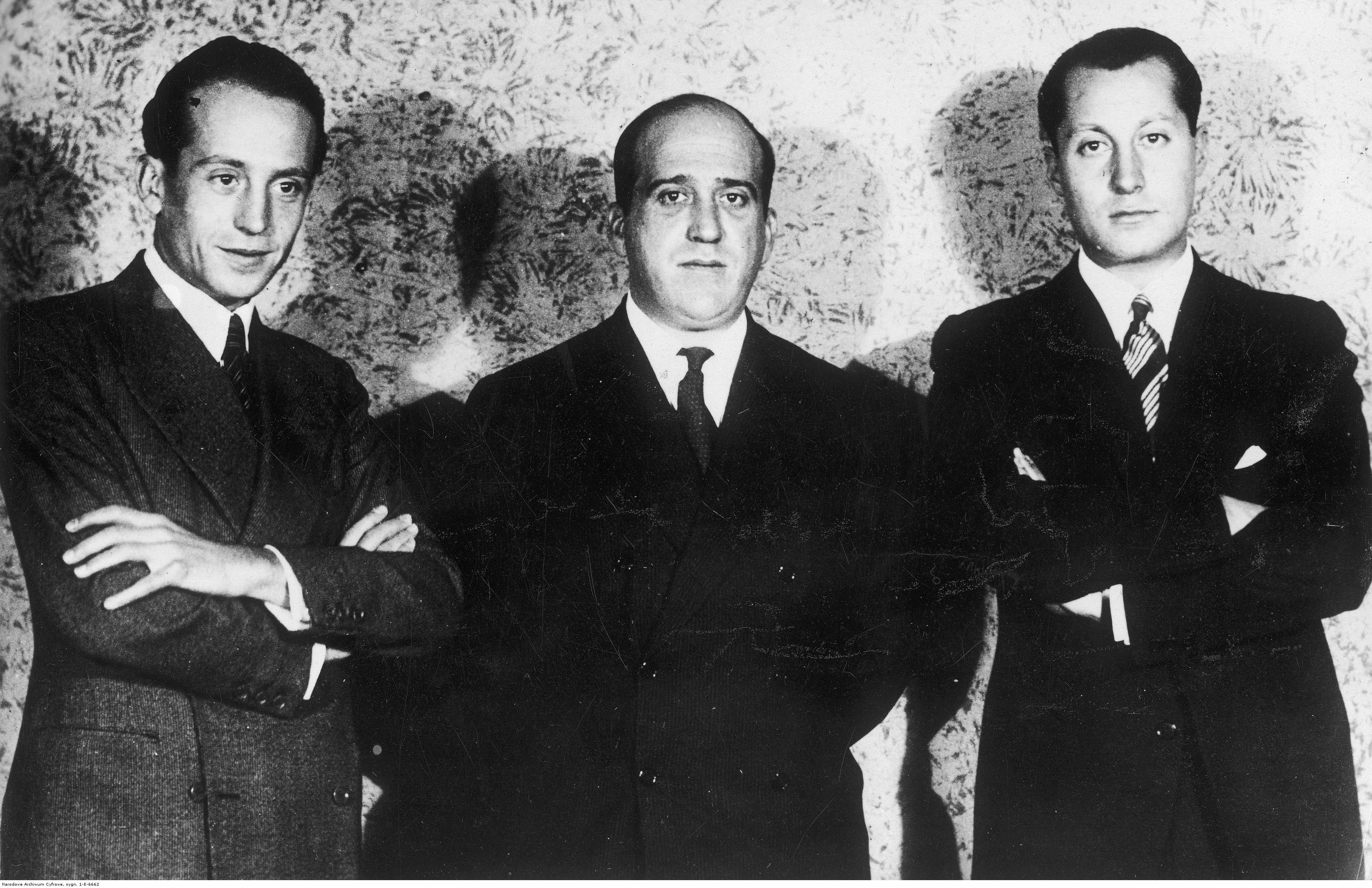
Alfonso García Valdecasas, Ruiz de Alda and Primo de Rivera in the 1933 foundational meeting.

On October 29, 1933, Primo de Rivera launched the Falange Española ("Spanish Phalanx"), a nationalist party, inspired in part with some ideas, such as the necessity of authority, hierarchical order of society, and grassroots populism, that were being expounded in Italy in the Fascist movement. The foundational convention was held in the Teatro de la Comedia of Madrid. He was the keynote speaker and his first address was a criticism of liberal democracy. In the speech he claimed the liberal state was not justified in its existence, criticised Rousseau, claimed democracy was hypocritical, and called on violence against the Spanish government. During the speech he made remarks stating that violence was needed. Rivera claimed that certain goals could only be achieved through violence, and that the situation called only for insurrection.

Stanley G. Payne argues that Rivera's view that violence was acceptable if done for a just cause was paralleled by that of the Spanish Left, who held similar views on the use of violence; unlike the Italian fascists, the Falange never developed a sophisticated theory for their doctrine of violence. Payne argues that because his father had ruled as a dictator with relatively minimal violence during the quieter 1920s, Rivera naively assumed he could impose a new authoritarian system with relatively limited violence, but he would eventually find himself caught in a spiral of killing that he could not control. When he founded the Falange, Antonio was more reluctant to use violence than other leading members of the party; he did not seem to expect violence from the political Left to be directed against the party. However, after Juan Cuéllar's death, he seemed to overcome his reluctance and thus intermittent killings on both sides would continue.

Rivera's closing words on the eve of the 1933 Spanish general election made explicit his Romantic nationalism. Stating that the people of Spain would need to make sacrifices in the name of nationalism. And claiming that right-wing parties in the election would not attain his desired result. Despite being a candidate he stated "I take part in these elections without faith or respect." Finally closing with a statement for political action outside of the official government.

He was a candidate in the general election of November 19 for the umbrella organization "Unión Agraria y Ciudadana," part of the broad conservative coalition Confederación Española de Derechas Autónomas (CEDA). He was elected to the Parliament as a representative of Cádiz.

In his first parliamentary intervention he answered Gil-Robles—the founder of CEDA—who had just spoken out against all totalitarian forms of government for arrogating to themselves the attributes of God and crushing the personality of the individual. Rivera was elected under a shock coalition formed between the Radical Republican Party and CEDA, meaning he entered government. The agreement would collapse support for the Radicals, which had previously Spain's largest Republican party during the 1936 Spanish general election. In the speech he moderated some of his positions, claimed no individual or social class holds all the power in society. Also stating that the state should follow Rousseau's ideals of representing the will of the people. Claimed that "goodness and truth are perennial tributaries of reason" and closed calling for unity towards a "permanent aspiration."

On February 11, 1934, Falange merged with Ramiro Ledesma's Juntas de Ofensiva Nacional-Sindicalista to create the Falange Española de las JONS under José Antonio's leadership. The antisemitic positions within FE de las JONS were mainly led by Onésimo Redondo, with Ledesma and Primo de Rivera largely indifferent to the issue; however, Falangists attacked the Jewish-owned SEPU department stores in the spring of 1935; In the view of Gonzalo Álvarez Chillida, both José Antonio and Ledesma probably thought that such antisemitic raids could enhance mobilization within the purportedly threatened small-business sector. He shared with other rightists the belief that violence was legitimate against a Republic that he perceived as influenced by communists, Jews and Freemasons.

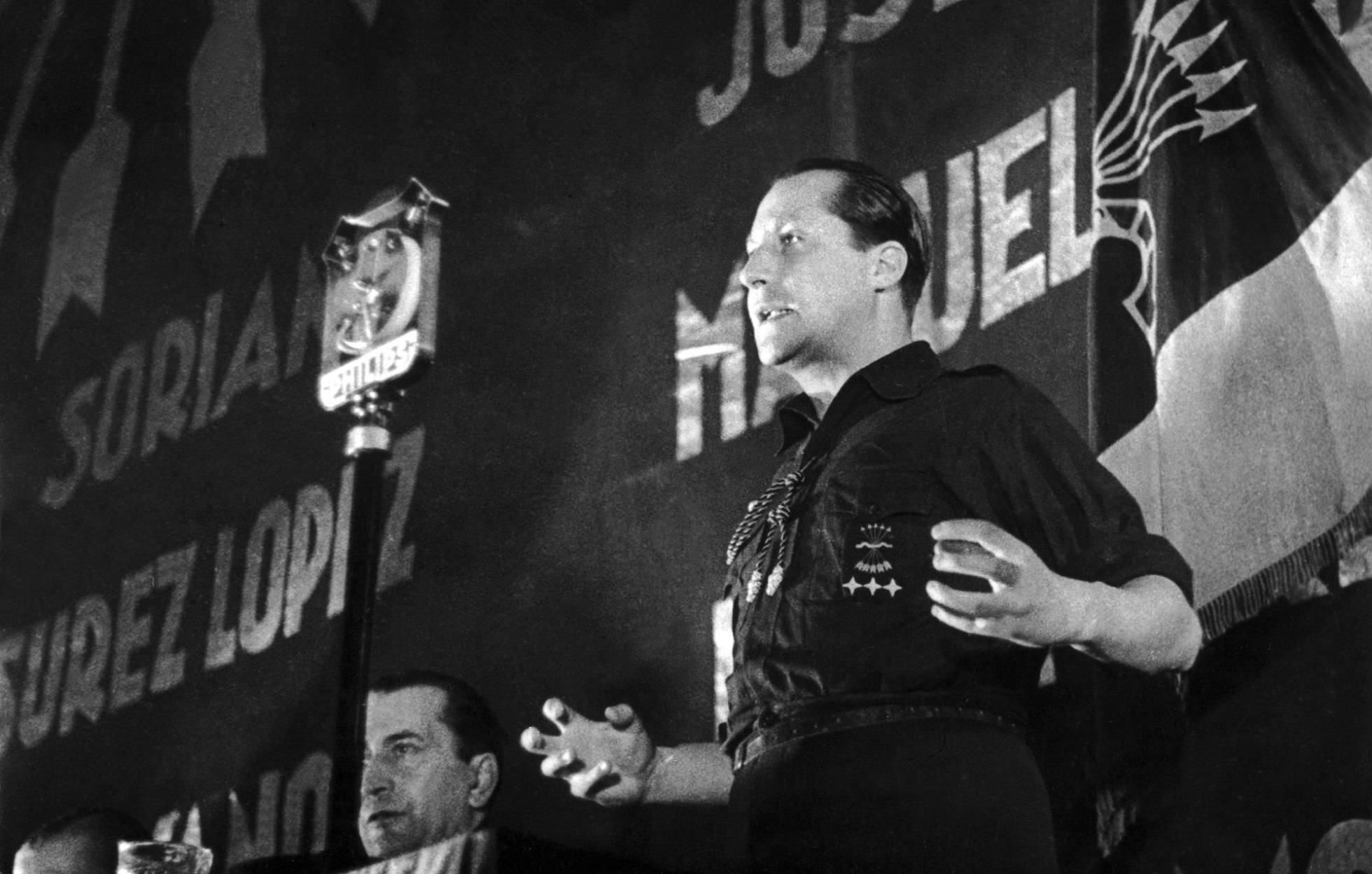
Photographed during a political rally (c. 1935–36). The Falangist blue shirt was an emblematic uniform embodying the idea of the Falangist discipline, hierarchy and violence, as well as, often dressed with the top button unbuttoned, it contributed to the discourse of masculine "virility".

The upper-class José Antonio abandoned the tie and suit and took on the new blue-shirt Falange uniform (despite later mocking JAP militants because of this, the Falangists were originally dressed in suit and tie); the uniform, adopted in October 1935, was deliberately chosen as a reference to Italian Fascism.

In 1935 Primo de Rivera collaborated in editing the lyrics of the Falangist anthem, "Cara al Sol" (Face to the Sun).

Every member of the Falange had to obey unquestioningly. They were told:

The honour and task of Falange must be gauged by those who carry the burden of leadership on their shoulders. Do not forget that one of the rules of our code of ethics is to have faith in the leaders. Your leaders are always right.

Prior to general elections of February 16, 1936, Primo discussed with Gil-Robles the question of Falange joining CEDA-led electoral alliances. He was offered 3 places, including the one in Salamanca which virtually guaranteed the mandate. However, Primo was not satisfied with the proposal, rejected it and decided that Falange candidates would run on their own.

Primo fielded his personal candidature in 13 electoral districts, always as individual non-aligned Falange candidate. In total, he won 24,017 votes. He performed best in Cádiz (he was supported by 7,499 voters, it is 4.66% of all voters), followed by Cáceres (4,427; 2.30%), Valladolid (2,793; 2.15%), Madrid city (4,995; 1.20%), Seville city (942; 0.79%), Toledo (1,479; 0.67%), Huesca (260; 0.27%), Oviedo (818; 0.25%), Ciudad Real (269; 0.14%), Orense (141; 0.08%), La Coruña (217; 0.07%), Albacete (87; 0.06%), and Baleares (90; 0.06%).

In Cuenca (where Primo did not run) the elections were initially declared invalid due to massive irregularities; they were to be repeated on May 3. This time the agreement with Gil-Robles was successfully concluded and Primo de Rivera was fielded on the list of a joint counter-revolutionary bloc. At this point electoral authorities changed the original decision and declared that the Cuenca elections, scheduled for May, would not be repeated elections, but the second round of indecisive February 16 elections. The change rendered Primo's candidature invalid, as in the second round only candidates running in the first round were allowed to stand (in case of repeated elections an entirely new set of candidates was possible). Some scholars claim that the decision was taken exactly to prevent Primo from standing. Despite this, Primo did not withdraw (unusually, according to the Spanish electoral law of the time, invalid candidates were allowed to remain on electoral lists, with votes for them discounted). There were 45,828 voters (44.38%) who supported Primo, even though most of them were probably aware that their votes would be discounted.

Falange won only 0.1% of the vote; but the wave of instability which greeted the victory of the Popular Front—a left-wing coalition of anarchists, communists, socialists, liberal republicans like the radicals, and others—caused an influx of new members, and the minuscule party grew to more than 40,000 members by July.

=== Imprisonment and execution ===
On March 14, 1936, he was arrested in Madrid and charged with illegal possession of firearms (at that time, Spain was awash in privately held weapons on the part of all political factions). Nine weeks later he was transferred to the prison in Alicante. In both Madrid and in Alicante, he was able to maintain intermittent secret contact with the Falange leadership and, several times, with General Emilio Mola. Notably, while writing to Mola of the importance of the Army to a counter-revolution against the Second Republic, Primo de Rivera said "Without your force it will be titanically difficult for us to conquer". Negotiation between Primo and Mola began on 29 May. The two developed a provisional agreement which specified that, in the rebellion, no more than a third of forces of the Falange in any specific area were to come under the direction of the Army. On October 3 he was charged with conspiracy against the Republic and military insurrection, both capital offences. Primo de Rivera conducted his own defence. On November 18 he was found guilty by a people's tribunal and sentenced to death by firing squad. The three career judges who participated in the trial, along with the popular tribunal, asked for the death sentence be commuted to life imprisonment but this was rejected by the majority of government ministers (the two ministers from Izquierda Republicana voted against the death sentence). The sentence was carried out on November 20 by local authorities in Alicante.

In his will, he professed his innocence and defended the case of his brother. He made specific wills on what was to happen to his belongings and assigned close companions to retrieve debts owed to him in order to pass it on to those he willed it to. One of the most significant clauses in his will assigned his companions to "destroy all of those of deeply personal character, those containing merely literary work, and those which are mere sketches and drafts in any early stage of development..."

From his will:

"As for my approaching death, I await it without vainglory, for it is never a gay thing to die at my age, but without complaint. May God Our Lord accept it for what sacrifice it may contain, in partial reparation for all there has been of egotism and vanity in much of my life. I forgive with all my heart everyone who may have harmed or offended me, without exception, and I beg the forgiveness of all those to whom I owe reparation for my injury great or small. Which being accomplished, I procced to order my last Will..."

It is said by some that the Republic offered the Nationalists a prisoner exchange involving Primo de Rivera and a son of the Republic's head of government Francisco Largo Caballero and that Franco turned down the offer. Others contend that it was the Republican government who rejected the deal of the Nationalists and that General Franco approved several failed commando raids on the Alicante prison to try to rescue José Antonio. Either way the death of the founder of Falange rid the general of a formidable rival. Perhaps tellingly, it was well known that the two men disliked each other. Much of this disagreement arose because Primo de Rivera strived to become the political leader of the Nationalist uprising. After one of the two meetings they had, Franco dismissed José Antonio as "a playboy pinturero" (a foppish playboy). Elizabeth Bibesco's last novel, The Romantic, published in 1940, starts with a dedication to José Antonio Primo de Rivera, whom she had known during her stay in Madrid where her husband, Prince Antoine Bibesco, was a diplomat from Romania in Spain between 1927 and 1931: "To José Antonio Primo de Rivera. I promised you a book before it was begun. It is yours now that it is finished – Those we love die for us only when we die–".

== Post-mortem relevance ==
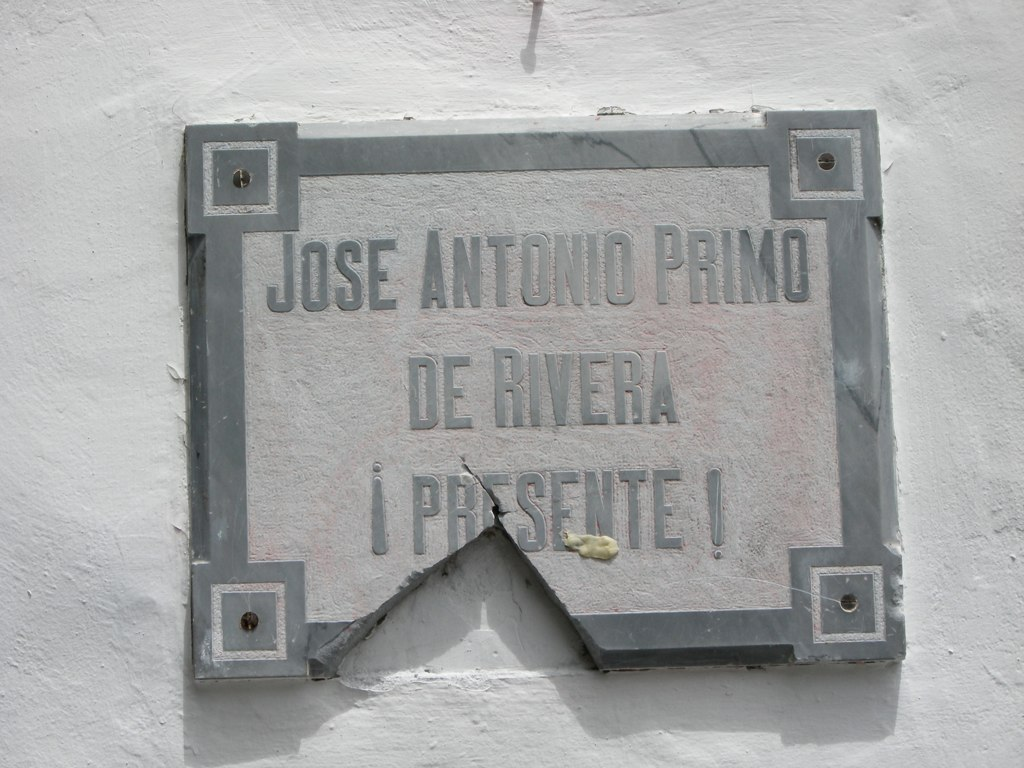
Plaque in Los Llanos de Aridane

With Primo de Rivera's approval, the Falange joined the military uprising against the Republic in 1936. The initially marginal party gained ascendancy over the course of the war, partly as a result of its prominent role in the brutal repression that took place behind Nationalist lines. Nevertheless, the party lost autonomy, and in 1937 was made wholly subservient to the will of General Franco when he had Primo de Rivera's temporary replacement, Manuel Hedilla Larrey, thrown in jail, tried and sentenced to death (although his sentence was commuted). Franco decreed the merging of the Falange Española de las JONS with the Carlist traditionalists through the Unification Decree, and became the national chief of the new party, FET y de las JONS.

The reign of Francisco Franco nurtured a convenient cult of personality around the dead figure of Primo de Rivera whom Falangists dubbed "El Ausente" (The Missing One). This name was created during the period after Primo de Rivera's execution but before this was officially confirmed to the Nationalist public at large by its leadership on 18 July 1938. While the Falangist leadership knew the truth, they chose to keep it a secret for fear of the impact it would have on morale, though rumours of his death would continue to circulate for the period. Thus until this date many Falangists had lived in hope that Primo de Rivera would still return (commonly saying "when José Antonio comes back") and began referring to him as "The Absent One", a reference to the Falange's tradition of calling "present!" when the names of the fallen were read out. The founder of Falange was anointed a martyr of the "crusade against Marxism." Notwithstanding the apparent veneration by the Francoist State, it remains true that the Missing One's demise had removed a dangerous opponent: Primo de Rivera had been marquis, a doctor of civil law, a political thinker; Franco owned no comparable pedigree, no comparable education and no personal ideology.

The postwar cult of personality had two ubiquitous icons. The first, a funereal slab placed on the external wall of many churches and cathedrals which bore the crowning inscription, Caídos por Dios y por España ("Fallen for God and for Spain"), followed by a list of local Nationalists killed during the war; Primo de Rivera's name headed every list. The second was the rallying cry, "José Antonio—¡Presente!," a figurative reply to an imaginary roll call invoking his ghostly attendance or immanence.

With the arrival of democratic rule, the legacy of Primo de Rivera and the cult of personality created by the Spanish state started to wane circumspectly. In 1981, the Madrid City Council moved to reinstate the original name of its grand avenue, the Gran Vía, which Franco had renamed "Avenida José Antonio Primo de Rivera" in 1939. However, as late as March 2005, the Guadalajara City Council removed a memorial to the founder of the Falange under cover of darkness.

=== Burial ===
At the end of the war in 1939, the remains of Primo de Rivera were carried on the shoulders of Falangist relay teams from Alicante to Madrid (a 300-kilometre journey) and provisionally interred at El Escorial. The church had contained the pantheon of Spanish monarchs but Primo de Rivera was buried directly in front of the altar.

==== Reburial at the Valley of the Fallen ====
In 1959, Primo de Rivera was exhumed and re-interred 13 km away in the basilica of the Valley of the Fallen, located in the Guadarrama mountain range. Between 1975 and 2019 Francisco Franco was buried nearby.

In the context of making the site less partisan, Franco's remains were removed from the Valley. This did not establish a clear precedent for moving Primo de Rivera, given that he died a victim of the Civil War like most of the other burials at the site. However, in late 2022 it was reported that Primo de Rivera's family had requested the exhumation of his remains on the grounds that the deceased wanted a Catholic burial. The Democratic Memory Law of 2022 envisaged the future of the Valley of the Fallen as a civil cemetery, and accordingly the government proposed to deconsecrate the crypt of the church in order to promote national reconciliation.

==== Reburial at San Isidro cemetery, Madrid ====
Primo de Rivera's family arranged for his remains to be exhumed from the Valley in April 2023 and reburied in Saint Isidore Cemetery in Madrid.

== Ideology ==
He espoused an elitist understanding of politics, influenced by the ideas of Ortega y Gasset. His political thought evolved as he progressively radicalized into a more anti-conservative direction. Primo de Rivera put much faith on corporatism, one of the few early Falangist tenets framed in positive terms, adopted from Italian Fascism.

Regarding political violence, he early alluded to what he famously termed as the "dialectics of fists and guns", already stating during the Falange foundation event at the Teatro de la Comedia, that in order to fulfill the desired cultural and historical regeneration of Spain, "if this has to be achieved through violence, we shall not be stopped by violence". Willing to offer an alternative to the most basic fundamentals behind liberal democracy, he also non-accidentally addressed some words of scorn to "that terrible man who was called Juan Jacobo Rousseau [sic]" during the foundational meeting of the Falange.

Like other Falangists, Primo de Rivera partially embraced the sense of Castilianist essentialism from the Generation of '98, but, conversely, he was also distinctly aware of the cultural plurality of the peoples in Spain, and thus the Falangist national project for Spain was framed following the orteguian legacy as one of "unity of destiny in the universal". It has been noted that at some point he benignly put his hopes on politicians far from his own fascist stances such as republican Manuel Azaña (in this case for a very brief time) or socialist Indalecio Prieto as potential candidates to alleviate his self-imposed burden for "saving" the country.

According to Álvarez Chillida, Primo de Rivera's written works did not feature a marked antisemitism when compared to other Falangist leaders. (Note: Álvarez Chillida just found two antisemitic tics in José Antonio, namely when he once connected the "hideous darkness" he saw in Karl Marx to the later's Jewish mentality, and when in 1935 he denounced "Jewish traffickers" were profiting from the passivity of the Republic before the revolutionary threat.) Writing on the stridency of Primo de Rivera's personal views compared to his endorsement of antisemitic violence, historian Paul Preston wrote "If he was not actively anti-Semitic, he shared the belief of the more conservative advocates that it was legitimate to annihilate the Jewish-masonic-Bolshevik conspiracy by violence."

Though Falangism marks resemblance to Italian Fascism, Primo de Rivera was openly critical of fascism which leaves the subject of whether or not he was fascist in great debate.

== Genealogy ==
Ancestors of José Antonio Primo de Rivera y Sáenz de Heredia

8. José Primo de Rivera y Ortiz de Pinedo
4. Miguel Primo de Rivera y Sobremonte
9. Juana Sobremonte y Larrazábal
2. Miguel Primo de Rivera y Orbaneja
10. Sebastián Orbaneja y Pérez
5. Inés Orbaneja y Pérez de Grandallana
11. Juana Pérez de Grandallana y Angulo
1. José Antonio Primo de Rivera y Sáenz de Heredia
12. Manuel Antonio Sáenz de Heredia y Sicilia
6. Gregorio Sáenz de Heredia y Tejada
13. María Cesárea Tejada y Santa María
3. Casilda Sáenz de Heredia y Suárez de Argudín
14. José Antonio Suárez-Argudín y García Barroso
7. Ángela Suárez-Argudín y Ramírez de Arellano
15. María Teresa Ramírez de Arellano y Fernández de Zaliella

== Bibliography ==
- Álvarez Chillida, Gonzalo (2002). El antisemitismo en España: la imagen del judío, 1812–2002. Madrid: Marcial Pons Historia. ISBN 84-95379-44-9.
- Álvarez Chillida, Gonzalo (2007). "La eclosión del antisemitismo español: de la II República al Holocausto". In Gonzalo Álvarez Chillida and Ricardo Izquierdo Benito (ed.). El antisemitismo en España. Cuenca: Ediciones de la Universidad de Castilla-La Mancha. pp. 181–206. ISBN 978-84-8427-471-1.
- Cadenas y Vicent, Vicente de (1955). "El marquesado de Estella, el condado de San Fernando de la Unión y el ducado de Primo de Rivera". Hidalguía. 3 (12). Madrid: 593–614.
- Fantoni y Benedí, Rafael (2003). "Los Benedit. Infanzones de Aragón y sus descendientes, Títulos del Reino, Grandes de España" (PDF). Hidalguía (298–299): 513–537. ISSN 0018-1285.
- Maurel, Marcos (2005). "Un asunto de fe. Fascismo en España (1933–1936)". In Ferran Gallego & Francisco Morente (ed.). Fascismo en España: ensayos sobre los orígenes sociales y culturales del franquismo. El Viejo Topo. pp. 133–162. ISBN 84-96356-32-9.
- Payne, Stanley G. (1961) Falange. A History of Spanish Fascism. Stanford University Press
- Preston, Paul (2023). Architects of Terror: Paranoia, Conspiracy, and Anti-Semitism in Franco's Spain. London, UK: William Collins. ISBN 978-0-00-852212-4.
- Ranzato, Gabriele (2006). El eclipse de la democracia: la Guerra Civil española y sus orígenes, 1931–1939. (translated by Javier Borrajo). Siglo XXI de España Editores.
- Rodrigo, Javier (2013). "A este lado del bisturí. Guerra, fascistización y cultura falangista". In Miguel Angel Ruiz Carnicer (ed.). Falange, las culturas políticas del fascismo en la España de Franco (1936–1975) (PDF). Vol. 1. Zaragoza: Institución Fernando el Católico. pp. 143–167. ISBN 978-84-9911-216-9.
- Saz, Ismael (2008). "Las culturas de los nacionalismos franquistas". Ayer (71): 153–174. JSTOR 41325981.
- Sesma Landrin, Nicolás (2012). "La dialéctica de los puños y de las pistolas. Una aproximación a la formación de la idea de estado en el fascismo español (1931–1945)" (PDF). Historia y Política (27). Madrid: CEPC; UCM; UNED: 51–82. ISSN 1575-0361.
- Thomas, Hugh. "The Hero in the Empty Room: Jose Antonio and Spanish Fascism," Journal of Contemporary History (1966) 1#1 pp. 174–182 JSTOR 259655
- Thomàs, Joan Maria (2019). "José Antonio Primo de Rivera y el Frente Popular". Historia y Política (41). Madrid: CEPC; UCM; UNED: 153–174. doi:10.18042/hp.41.06. hdl:20.500.11797/imarina5874065. ISSN 1575-0361.
- Velarde Fuertes, Juan. "José Antonio y la economía" Grafite ediciones. ISBN 84-96281-10-8
- Vincent, Mary (2006). "La reafirmación de la masculinidad en la cruzada franquista". Cuadernos de historia contemporánea. 28 (28). Universidad Complutense de Madrid: 135–151. ISSN 0214-400X.
- Payne, Stanley G. (2000). Fascism in Spain, 1923–77. University of Wisconsin Press. ISBN 978-02991-6564-2

Party political offices
New creation	Leader of the Falange Española de las JONS; 1934–1936	Succeeded by Manuel Hedilla
Spanish nobility
Preceded by Miguel Primo de Rivera y Orbaneja	Marquis of Estella; 1930–1936	Succeeded by Miguel Primo de Rivera y Sáenz de Heredia
New creation	Duke of Primo de Rivera; 1948 (posthumous)	Succeeded by Miguel Primo de Rivera y Sáenz de Heredia
