= Joaquín Jovellar y Soler =

Spanish general who served as the Prime Minister of Spain

The Most Excellent Joaquín Jovellar
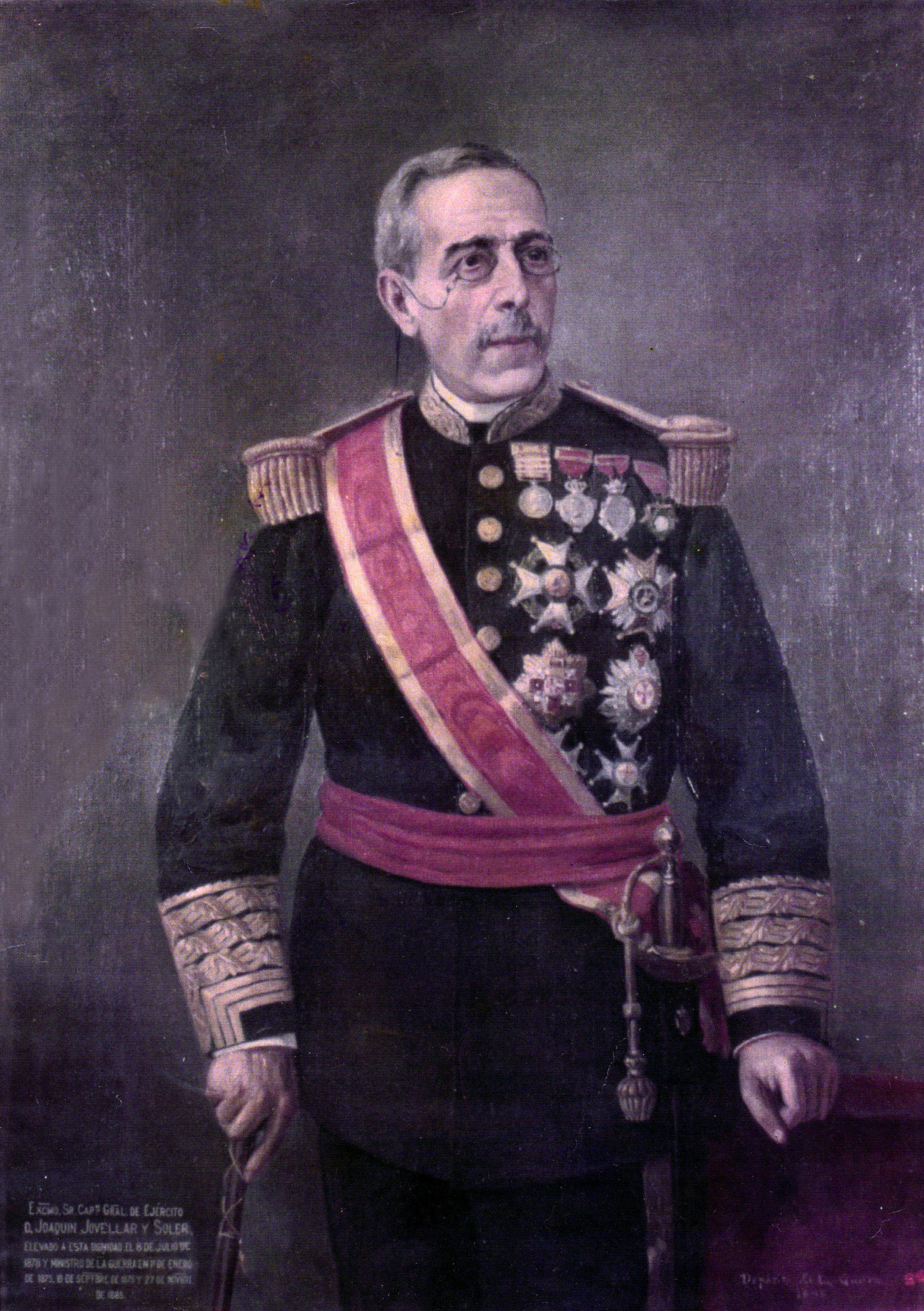

Prime Minister of Spain
- In office 12 September 1875 – 2 December 1875
- Monarch: Alfonso XII
- Preceded by: Antonio Cánovas del Castillo
- Succeeded by: Antonio Cánovas del Castillo

Minister of War of Spain
- In office 31 December 1874 – 2 December 1875
- Monarch: Alfonso XII
- Prime Minister: Antonio Cánovas del Castillo; Himself
- President of the Ministry-Regency: Antonio Cánovas del Castillo
- Preceded by: Francisco Serrano Bedoya
- Succeeded by: Francisco de Ceballos y Vargas
- In office 27 November 1885 – 10 October 1886
- Monarch: Alfonso XIII
- Regent: Maria Christina of Austria
- Prime Minister: Práxedes Mateo Sagasta
- Preceded by: Jenaro Quesada
- Succeeded by: Ignacio María del Castillo

Governor-General of the Philippines
- In office 7 April 1883 – 1 April 1885
- Monarch: Alfonso XII
- Prime Minister: Práxedes Mateo Sagasta; José Posada Herrera; Antonio Cánovas del Castillo
- Minister of Overseas: Fernando León y Castillo; Gaspar Núñez de Arce; Estanislao Suárez Inclán; Manuel Aguirre de Tejada
- Preceded by: Emilio de Molíns (acting); The Marquis of Estella
- Succeeded by: Emilio de Molíns (acting); Emilio Terrero y Perinat

Governor of Cuba
- In office 4 November 1873 – 6 April 1874
- President: Emilio Castelar; Francisco Serrano
- Prime Minister: Emilio Castelar; Francisco Serrano; Juan Zavala de la Puente
- Minister of Overseas: Santiago Soler y Pla; Tomás Mosquera
- Preceded by: Cándido Pieltaín
- Succeeded by: José Gutiérrez de la Concha
- In office 18 January 1876 – 18 June 1878
- Monarch: Alfonso XII
- Prime Minister: Antonio Cánovas del Castillo
- Minister of Overseas: Adelardo López de Ayala y Herrera; Cristóbal Martín de Herrera
- Preceded by: Blas Villate
- Succeeded by: Arsenio Martínez-Campos

Personal details
- Born: Joaquín Jovellar y Soler; 28 December 1819 Palma, Mallorca, Spain
- Died: 17 April 1892 (aged 72) Madrid

Military service
- Allegiance: Kingdom of Spain
- Rank
- Battles/wars: Glorious Revolution, Third Carlist War

Joaquín Jovellar y Soler (28 December 1819 – 17 April 1892) was a Spanish general who served as the Prime Minister of Spain from 12 September 1875 to 2 December 1875 and governor and captain-general of the Philippines from 7 April 1883 to 1 April 1885.

Jovellar was born in Palma de Mallorca. After his studies at military academy he was appointed sub-lieutenant, went to Cuba as captain in 1842. He returned to the War Office in 1851, was promoted major in 1853, and went to Morocco as private secretary to O'Donnell, who made him colonel in 1860, after Jovellar had been wounded at the battle of Wadel Ras.

In 1863 Jovellar became a brigadier-general and the following year he was appointed under-secretary for war. Despite being severely wounded in fighting insurgents on the streets of Madrid, he rose to the rank of general of division in 1866. Jovellar adhered to the revolution, and Amadeo made him a lieutenant-general in 1872. In the autumn of 1873, Castelar sent him to Cuba as governor-general which he served from November 1873 – 1874 and June 1876–October 1878. In 1874 Jovellar came back to the Peninsula, and afterwards and was in command of the Army of the Center against the Carlists when Arsenio Martínez Campos went to Sagunto to proclaim Alfonso XII. Alfonso XII made him a captain-general, president of the council, life-senator, and governor-general of the Philippines (1883–1885). Jovellar died in Madrid on 17 April 1892.

Political offices
Preceded by Antonio Cánovas del Castillo	Prime Minister of Spain; 1875	Succeeded by Antonio Cánovas del Castillo
Preceded by Emilio de Molíns	103rd Governor and Captain-General of the Philippines; 1883–1885	Succeeded by Emilio de Molíns
