= Manuel Pavía y Rodríguez de Alburquerque =

Spanish general

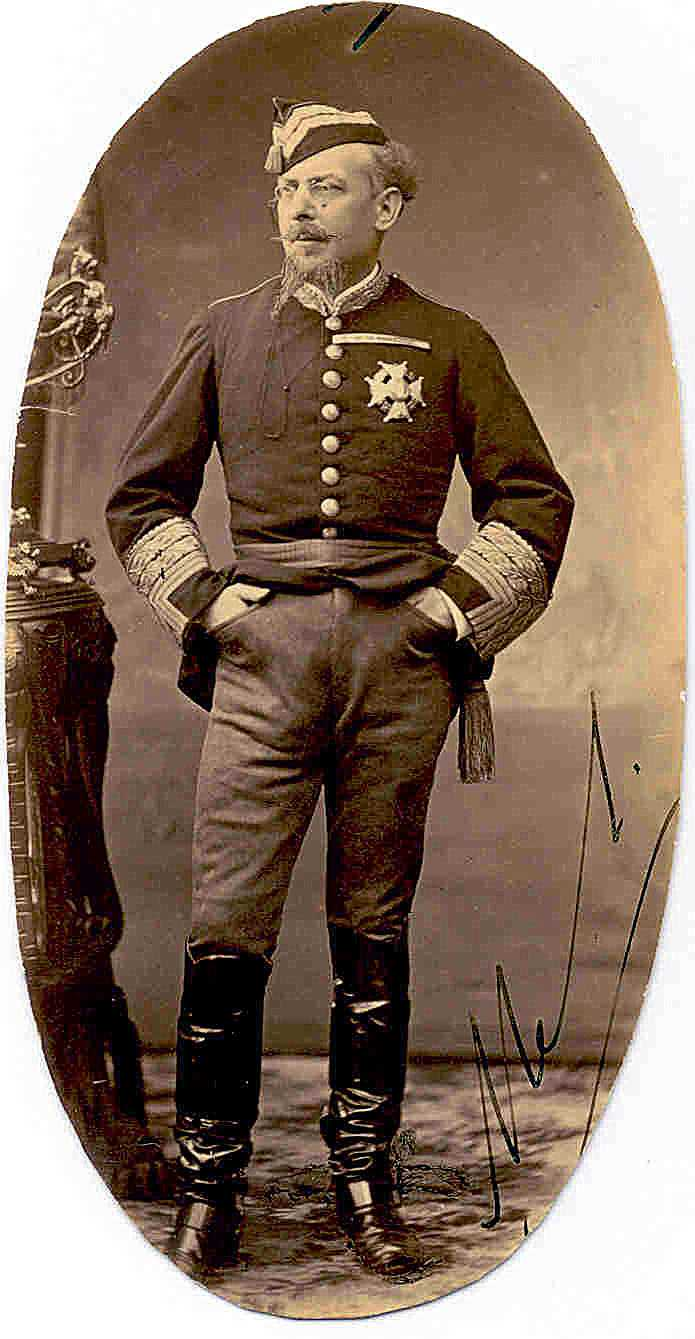
Manuel Pavia

Manuel Pavia y Rodriguez de Alburquerque (2 August 1828 – 4 January 1895) was a Spanish general, who was an important part of Spanish political life during the second half of the 19th century. He participated in the Revolution of 1868, which removed Isabella II from power, and led the coup d'état which brought down the First Spanish Republic, giving way to the Restoration and the rule of Isabella's son Alfonso XII.

== Early career ==
He was born on 2 August 1828 in Cádiz. His military career began in 1841, when he entered the Royal Artillery College at Segovia. He became a lieutenant in 1846 and a captain in 1855. Pavía returned to Spain after fighting in the Hispano-Moroccan War (1859–1860) and in the European expedition to Mexico in 1862; in the latter year he was proclaimed major.

In January 1866, he was a commander under the general Juan Prim. He participated in an unsuccessful mutiny against the regime of Isabella II, ruined in Madrid. Prim left the Liberal Union of Leopoldo O'Donnell and joined the new Progressive Party. At the end of that year, Pavía and Prim organised a mutiny with other generals, but this rebellion didn't succeed due to lack of popular and military support.

O'Donnell sent a detachment to detain the conspirators. Prim and Pavía escaped to Portugal, persecuted by Zavala and Echagüe. During the escape they received much support from the Spanish population.

== 1868 revolution to restoration ==
After two years of exile, Pavía returned to Spain collaborating again with Prim, but this time he began a successful revolutionary movement in August 1866 with the Pact of Ostend with the Federal Democratic Republican Party.

Armed insurrection broke out in Andalusia, prepared by revolutionary juntas composed by democrats and progressives, which acted in favour of a military conspiracy. In September 1868, after proclaiming the slogan España con honra (Spain with honour), Prim disembarked in Cádiz. On 28 September he won the battle of Alcolea, and the support of Barcelona and the Mediterranean coast, which was decisive for the victory of the revolution. The queen left the country in 30 September and a provisional government was set up under General Francisco Serrano.

During this period, Pavía fought in Navarra at the beginning of the Third Carlist War. With the First Spanish Republic proclaimed, during the presidency of Francesc Pi i Margall he and General Arsenio Martínez Campos put down the cantonalist insurrection initiated on 12 July 1873 in Cartagena, which aspired to constitute a federation of the autonomic territorial organizations of the central power.

Pavía and Martínez Campos one by one took almost all the cantons between 26 July and 8 August, being the president Emilio Castelar. Only the canton of Cartagena resisted, until 13 January of the following year. At the end of 1873, Pavía was again Captain general of Castilla la Nueva, with a capital in Madrid. He still held the position when the president Castelar, during the first days of 1874, asked the "Congreso de los Diputados" for a vote of confidence, which was rejected.

On 3 January Pavía (whose political posture favoured united centralism) presented himself in the Congress and ordered the evacuation the building at the moment that it was proceeding to a new presidential election ruled by a federalist. With the coup d'état over, the Fase Pretoriana of the First Republic began, led by Francisco Serrano (Duque de la Torre). This rapidly gave way to the return of the monarchy of the House of Bourbon with Alfonso XII, son of Isabella II.

During the Restoration, Pavía was the captain general of Catalonia from 1880 until 1881 and again captain general of "Castilla la Nueva" in 1885, under the regency of María Cristina de Habsburgo-Lorena. In 1886, carrying out these duties, he defeated the popular anti-dynastic Manuel Villacampa in Madrid.

== Pavia Coup d'état ==
On 3 January 1874, when Castelar lost a motion of confidence and the election of a new Government was proceeding, to whose presidency the centrist Eduardo Palanca aspired, Pavía sent a note to the president of the Cortes, Nicolás Salmerón, ordering him to vacate the premises. The deputies did not obey the order and remained in their seats, although they ended up doing so when a crew of the Civil Guard presented in the chamber and evicted them, dissolving the Cortes and ending the republican parliamentary regime.

After the coup d'état, Pavía convened all the political parties—except Cantonalists and Carlists—to form a government of national concentration, which would give power to general Serrano, beginning like this a republican dictatorship that would culminate with the restoration of the monarchy in the person of Alfonso XII.

Pavia's act before the Cortes was judged very harshly by supporters of the parliamentary system. The day after the events, Castelar himself published a vigorous protest, which in any case did not silence the rumors that the coup d'état had been prepared with his connivance.

For a few months he was general in chief of the Central Army, but on 28 September 1874 the Minister of War Francisco Serrano Bedoya chose Joaquín Jovellar y Soler to replace him. Jovellar joined the preparations of the Sagunto pronouncement, led by General Arsenio Martínez Campos to restore the House of Borbón to the throne.

== Death ==
During his last years of life, he was promoted to captain general, was president of the "Consejo Supremo de Guerra y Marina" and wrote military histories. Manuel Pavía died on 4 January 1895.
