= Marfori =

Marfori is a surname. Notable people with this surname include:

- Andrea Marfori (born 1958), Italian film director
- Antonio Marfori (1937–1974), Filipino pilot
- Carlos Marfori (1821–1892), Spanish-Italian politician
- Filippo Marfori Savini (1877–1952), Italian artist
- Jose Maria Marfori (1939–2003), Filipino actor
