= Miguel Primo de Rivera y Urquijo =

Spanish politician, lawyer and businessman (1934–2018)

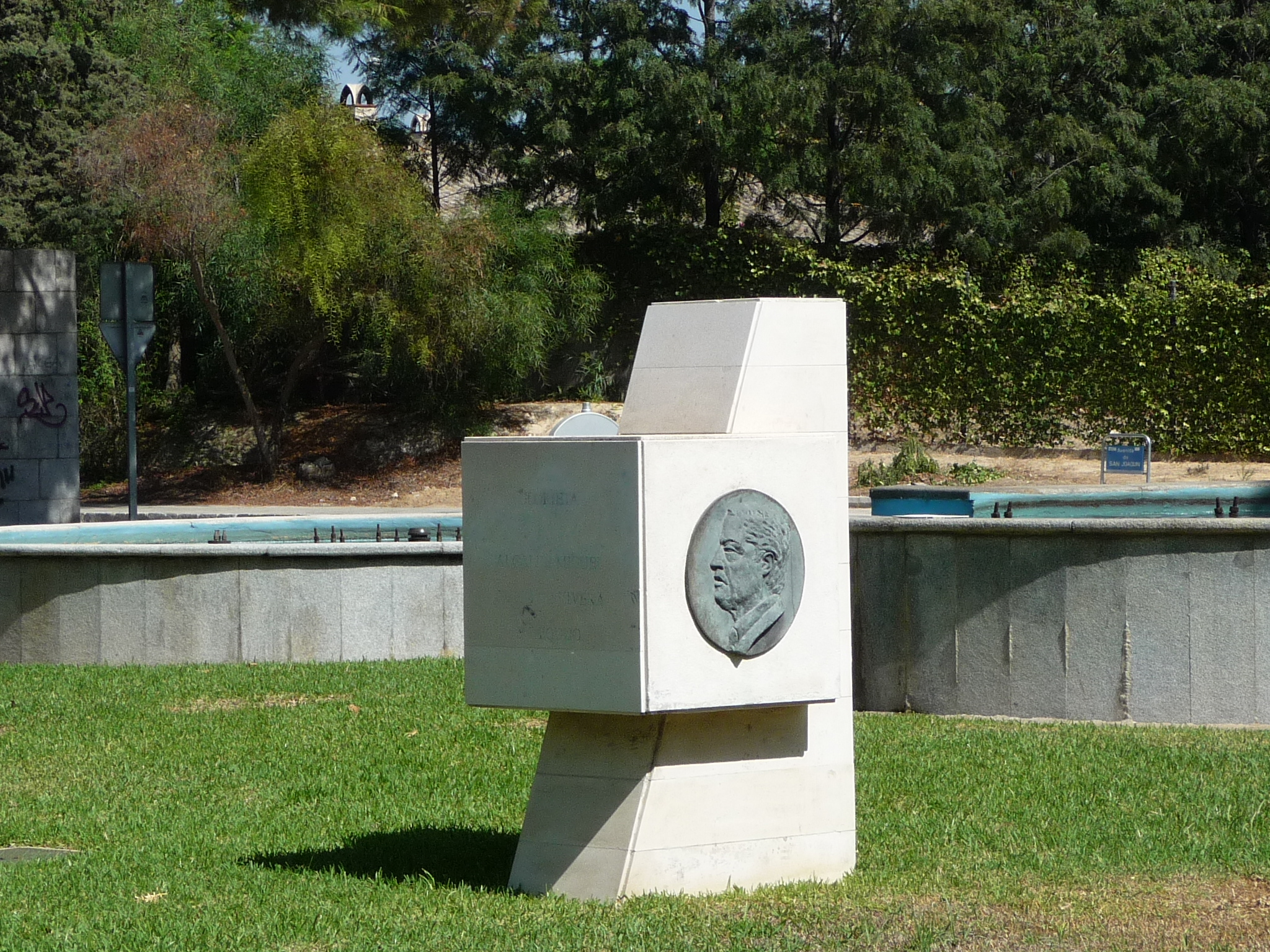
Monument to Mayor Miguel Primo de Rivera y Urquijo in Jerez (Spain), currently removed

Miguel Primo de Rivera y Urquijo, 3rd Duke of Primo de Rivera, 5th Marquis of Estella (17 August 1934 – 3 December 2018) was a Spanish politician, lawyer and businessman. He was a grandchild of the Spanish dictator of the same name. He was mayor of the city of Jerez from 1965 to 1971. He succeeded his uncle as 3rd Duke of Primo de Rivera and passed down the subsidiary title of Marquis of Estella to his son.

== Personal life ==
He was the grandson of Miguel Primo de Rivera, a dictator who ruled Spain from 1923 to 1930. His father Fernando (1908-1936) was the youngest brother of José Antonio Primo de Rivera, the founder and leader of Falange Española. He attended school with future king Juan Carlos I of Spain. It was in their school years that they became life-long friends.

== Political life ==
Because of his friendship with then-prince Juan Carlos and his commitment to the restoration of the monarchy after General Franco's death, he lobbied inside the Francoist institutions, as instructed by the newly proclaimed king, to produce a candidate for Prime Minister, namely Adolfo Suárez, who was prepared to implement democratic reform. He was then tasked with presenting the Political Reform Bill to the Francoist Cortes (parliament). His role was instrumental in that the new law made possible the new democratic reforms that would culminate in the Spanish Constitution of 1978. He worked behind the scenes to ensure the support of some reluctant members of the Cortes, most notably his own aunt, Pilar Primo de Rivera, the leader of the regime's Women's Organization, who had been a stalwart of Franco's regime. He was made a Senator by royal appointment in 1977.

Spanish nobility
Preceded by Miguel Primo de Rivera	Duke of Primo de Rivera; 1965–2018	Succeeded by Fernando Primo de Rivera
