= Duke of Primo de Rivera =

Former hereditary title in the Spanish nobility

Dukedom of Primo de Rivera
- Creation date: 18 July 1948
- Created by: General Francisco Franco
- Peerage: Spain
- First holder: José Antonio Primo de Rivera, 1st Duke (posthumous title)
- Last holder: Fernando Primo de Rivera y Oriol, 4th Duke
- Present holder: Abolished
- Remainder to: Absolute primogeniture
- Subsidiary titles: Marquess of Estella

The Dukedom of Primo de Rivera (Spanish: Ducado de Primo de Rivera) was a hereditary title in the Spanish nobility. The dukedom was posthumously bestowed on José Antonio Primo de Rivera, founder of the Falangist movement, by General Francisco Franco as head of the Spanish State.

Since José Antonio had no children, the title devolved to his younger brother (Miguel Primo de Rivera y Sáenz de Heredia) and subsequently, for the very same reason, to his nephew Miguel Primo de Rivera y Urquijo.

It was abolished in October 2022, under the purview of the Law of Democratic Memory.

== Dukes of Primo de Rivera (1948–2022) ==
- José Antonio Primo de Rivera y Sáenz de Heredia, 1st Duke of Primo de Rivera (posthumous title, d. 1936)
- Miguel Primo de Rivera y Sáenz de Heredia, 2nd Duke of Primo de Rivera (1948–1964)
- Miguel Primo de Rivera y Urquijo, 3rd Duke of Primo de Rivera (1965–2018)
- Fernando Primo de Rivera y Oriol, 4th Duke of Primo de Rivera (2019–2022)

== Family tree ==
Miguel Primo de Rivera, 2nd Marquess of Estella; 1870–1930
José Antonio Primo de Rivera, 1st Duke of Primo de Rivera; 1903–1936	Miguel Primo de Rivera, 2nd Duke of Primo de Rivera; 1904–1964	Fernando Primo de Rivera y Sáenz de Heredia; 1908–1936
Miguel Primo de Rivera, 3rd Duke of Primo de Rivera; 1934–2018
Fernando Primo de Rivera, 4th Duke of Primo de Rivera; 1962
