= New Calamba =

New Calamba Nueva Calambá
- Proposed settlement
- Etymology: Town of Calamba, Laguna
- Territory: British North Borneo

Area
  - Total: 20.23 km^{2} (7.81 sq mi)
- Initial and minimum proposed area

New Calamba (Spanish: Nueva Calambá) was a planned Filipino settlement in Borneo by José Rizal. At the time the settlement was proposed the area which is now situated in the Malaysian state of Sabah was under the administration of the British North Borneo Chartered Company. The Filipino settlement was proposed to be governed autonomously under British North Borneo.

Rizal envisioned the settlement after residents in his native Calamba, Laguna were left homeless after the resolution of a land dispute in favor of the Dominican friars.

== Location ==
New Calamba or Nueva Calambá was planned to be established in North Borneo in an area situated near the Bengkoka River and Marudu Bay. Rizal has negotiated with the governor of North Borneo to lease at least 5,000 acres (2,000 ha) or 20.23 square kilometers (7.81 sq mi) of land for 950 years for the establishment of the settlement with the option to purchase thousands of acres more.

== History ==
=== Calamba land dispute ===
Plans to set up New Calamba was due to a land dispute in Calamba, Laguna in the Spanish governed Philippine islands. The dispute originated from a directive of Governor General Emilio Terrero y Perinat ordering for the investigation of estates owned by Dominican friars as an effort to resolve agrarian issues and problems in collection of land taxes and tenancy upon the request of José Rizal. Rizal was in turn urged by tenants in Calamba to call for an investigation regarding the hacienda owned by the Dominican Order which was later found out to consist of not only the area around Calamba but the whole town. Rizal's actions drew the ire of the friars.

The Supreme Court of Spain made a decision regarding the case and the Madrid-based court ruled in favor of the Dominicans recognizing their proprietorship over the disputed lands in Calamba and ordered the tenants of Calamba to leave the hacienda within 12 days or face expulsion. Among those tenants were Rizal's family. When Valeriano Wéyler, an ally of the friars, took over as Governor General succeeding Terrero, implemented the decision by sending 50 soldiers from the peninsular regiment of artillery to expel the tenants and burnt their houses.

=== Conceptualization ===
José Rizal began conceptualizing the idea of establishing a Filipino settlement in North Borneo while he was on a trip to Hong Kong. In the British colony, Rizal shared the concept to Englishman W.B. Pryor and his wife who were en route to North Borneo. Based on a letter addressed to Ferdinand Blumentritt dated on February 23, 1892, Rizal was thought to consider relocating his family to North Borneo where he plans to establish a Filipino settlement geared towards agriculture with himself as their leader. Rizal observed what he perceive was better governance of the British of their colony, Hong Kong compared to the Spanish's administration of the Philippines particularly their harsh treatment of the island's natives.

=== Attempted establishment ===
Rizal prepared an agreement with the British North Borneo Company by January 1892. The North Borneo company proposed the permanent settlement of Filipinos in North Borneo, the sale and lease of lands in the area where they could settle for 999 years, and an arrangement that would allow the settlers to govern themselves while remaining under the jurisdiction of the company.

Aware that he would need the consent of the Spanish colonial government for the resettlement of evicted residents of Calamba to North Borneo, Rizal wrote a letter to Governor General Eulogio Despujol on March 21, 1892 to seek permission to do so. Within the same month, Pryor, whom Rizal met back in Hong Kong informed Rizal that North Borneo needs manpower with British inviting Rizal to visit Sandakan. The North Borneo company further offered the construction of buildings and plantation of orchards for the planned Filipino settlement in an arrangement where settlers would pay for the cost which is payable in three years.

Rizal entered into a negotiation with the acting Secretary of the North Borneo Government in the absence of the territory's governor. The secretary recorded the conditions of the proposed settlement in writing. Rizal later met with the Governor of North Borneo on April 6, 1892 before leaving for Hong Kong via the Memnon the following day.

=== Spanish opposition ===
José Rizal upon his arrival in the British colony of Hong Kong received the official position of the Spanish colonial government from its consulate in Hong Kong regarding his plan for a Filipino settlement in North Borneo. Governor General Despujol did not reply through letter but through a consul, Despujol informed Rizal his rejection of the plan which he viewed as "anti-patriotic" due to labor shortage in the Philippines. The plan was also viewed with suspicion fearing that a Filipino colony in North Borneo could be used to launch a Filipino revolution against the Spanish colonial government. He also invited Rizal to meet with him in Manila to discuss the plan and Rizal accepted the invitation despite objections from his friends fearing for his safety.

On June 26, 1892, Rizal arrived in Manila and had a series of meeting with Despujol at the Malacañang Palace before he was arrested after he was found to possess leaflets critical to the clergy which was planted by friars. Rizal was put into detention at Fort Santiago before he was executed. His death was later credited to have contributed to the Philippine Revolution.

== Governance ==
New Calamba would have been part of British North Borneo but would have some degree of autonomy. Residents are excluded from free labor or conscription except if the territory's sovereignty was placed under threat.
