= Fernando Primo de Rivera =

Spanish general and politician (1831–1921)

The Most Excellent The Marquis of Estella
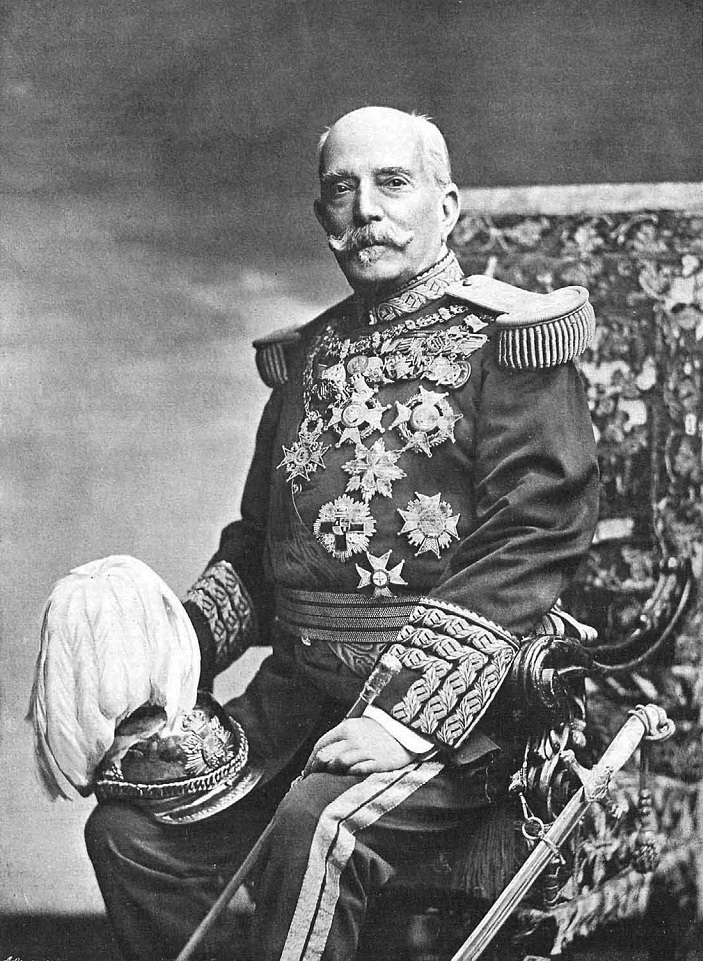
- Photograph by Kaulak

102nd and 115th Governor and Captain-General of the Philippines
- In office April 23, 1897 – April 11, 1898
- Monarch: Alfonso XIII
- Regent: Maria Christina of Austria
- Prime Minister: Antonio Cánovas del Castillo; Marcelo Azcárraga Palmero; Práxedes Mateo Sagasta
- Minister of Overseas: Tomás Castellano y Villarroya; Segismundo Moret
- Preceded by: José de Lachambre
- Succeeded by: Basilio Augustín
- In office April 15, 1880 – March 10, 1883
- Monarch: Alfonso XII
- Prime Minister: Antonio Cánovas del Castillo; Práxedes Mateo Sagasta
- Minister of Overseas: Cayetano Sánchez Bustillo; Fernando León y Castillo
- Preceded by: Rafael Rodríguez Arias
- Succeeded by: Emilio de Molíns

Minister of War of Spain
- Interim
- In office 31 December 1874 – 1 January 1875
- President of the Ministry-Regency: Antonio Cánovas del Castillo
- Preceded by: Francisco Serrano Bedoya
- Succeeded by: Joaquín Jovellar
- In office 3 July 1907 – 1 March 1909
- Monarch: Alfonso XIII
- Prime Minister: Antonio Maura
- Preceded by: Francisco de Paula Loño y Pérez
- Succeeded by: Arsenio Linares y Pombo
- In office 11 June – 18 October 1917
- Monarch: Alfonso XIII
- Prime Minister: Eduardo Dato
- Preceded by: Francisco Aguilera y Egea
- Succeeded by: José Marina Vega

Personal details
- Born: 24 July 1831 Sevilla, Spain
- Died: May 23, 1921 (aged 89) Madrid, Spain
- Relatives: José Antonio Primo de Rivera (grandnephew)

Fernando Primo de Rivera y Sobremonte, 1st Marquis of Estella (24 July 1831 – 23 May 1921) was a Spanish army officer and politician.

Fernando Primo de Rivera was the son of Jose Joaquin Primo de Rivera y Ortiz de Pinedo (1777-1853), an important naval officer, and his wife Juana María Nepomucena de Sobremonte y Larrazábal. His paternal grandfather was Joaquín Primo de Rivera y Pérez de Acal, governor of Maracaibo.

He served in several wars, including the 1848 and 1866 Madrid insurrections and the second Carlista War. When forces under his command in the second Carlist War captured Estella, he was named Marquis of Estella. He was the Spanish Governor-General of the Philippines from 1880 to 1883. In 1897, he again became the Spanish Governor-General of the Philippines. He temporarily suspended hostilities in the Philippine Revolution through negotiations with Emilio Aguinaldo in the Pact of Biak-na-Bato. He was a Minister and the 70th Prime Minister of Spain for one day between 30 and 31 December 1874. He was created the 1st Marquis of Estella on 25 May 1877, the 1,124th Knight of the Spanish Order of the Golden Fleece and the 287th Grand Cross of the Royal Order of Our Lady of the Concepcion of Vila Viçosa of Portugal in 1879.

He was married in Sevilla on 18 June 1857 to María del Pilar Arias-Quiroga y Escalera (Sevilla, Alcolea del Río, c. 1835 – 10 May 1894), 745th Dame of the Royal Order of Queen María Luisa, daughter of Juan Arias-Quiroga y Mejías, 7th Marquis of Arias-Quiroga and his wife María Manuela de Escalera y Fernández de Peñaranda, daughter of Roberto de Escalera y Fernandez de Peñaranda, 46th Lord of Peñaranda, by whom he had no issue. He was also the uncle of Miguel Primo de Rivera, the Spanish dictator, and granduncle of the founder of the Falange Española, Jose Antonio Primo de Rivera.

Government offices
Preceded by Rafael Rodríguez Arias	Governor-General of the Philippines; 1880–1883	Succeeded by Emilio de Molíns
Preceded by José de Lachambre	Governor-General of the Philippines; 1897–1898	Succeeded by Basilio Augustín
Spanish nobility
New creation	Marquis of Estella; 1877–1921	Succeeded by Miguel Primo de Rivera
