= Lanzadera Campaign =

Campaign in the Cuban War of Independence

- Part of Cuban War of Independence and Invasion from East to West in Cuba
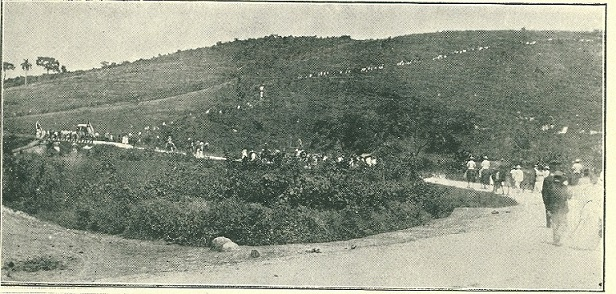
- Gómez and his men marching towards Bejucal
Date	January 7, 1896 – February 19, 1896
Location	La Habana Province, Cuba
Result	Cuban victory

Belligerents
Cuban rebels	Spain

Commanders and leaders
Máximo Gómez; Antonio Maceo	Arsenio Martínez Campos; Sabás Marín; Valeriano Weyler

Strength
2,000 Infantry	40,000 Infantry

The Lanzadera Campaign was a significant part of the Cuban War of Independence as it was the next operation of the Mambises by Máximo Gómez to distract Spanish troops to him and avoiding their pressure on Antonio Maceo, who was able to continue to the West to complete the Invasion from East to West in Cuba. The campaign was considered to be one of skillful maneuvering, mobility and oversight as Gómez's vastly outnumbered 2,000 Mambises had achieved their goals with negligible losses against the 40,000 Spanish infantry which was commanded by Arsenio Martínez Campos, Sabás Marín and Valeriano Weyler.

== Background ==
The war had extended to the Havana region by early 1896 after the Cubans defeated the Spanish at the Battle of Las Taironas which caused the Spanish to get concerned on what to do as the Cubans were mere kilometres away from the capital and began taking measures to not only stop the Cubans from taking the capital but to put a end to their advance to Havana. Around the same time, Cuban generals Antonio Maceo and Máximo Gómez decided to split ways into two different columns as Maceo would go on to defeat the Spanish at Las Taironas and head for the Pinar del Río Province while Gómez was tasked with distracting the main Spanish forces around the Havana area.

== Campaign ==
The Campaign began on January 7, 1896 when the two generals parted ways to focus on their own campaigns and would conclude on February 19 when they would reunite at Soto which was 6 kilometers away from Jaruco. Gómez had to deal with the narrow territory of the Province in the middle of "a terrible maze of stone fences" and to distract the Spanish garrison nearby. Maceo received notice of Gómez's plans and wrote the following:

The general (Maceo) begins his invasion march to the province of Pinar del Río, and I counter-march to support him and sustain me in Havana.

Gómez achieved his goal of distracting the Spanish army by using Guerrilla warfare as around 40,000 Spanish troops began their relentless pursuit which never managed to stop Gómez's continuous mobility and knowledge of the geography despite the larger Spanish force. During the campaign, Gómez carried out important incursions through the towns of Alquízar, Bejucal, Güira de Melena, Quivicán and Batabanó in the southeast portions of the island. Later on, he went on to the northeastern towns of Moralitos, Managua, San José de Las Lajas and Tapaste, to countermarch again to the southeast and enter Güines, San Nicolás de Bari and Melena del Sur.

== Aftermath ==
The cooperation of the Campaign to support Maceo's campaign during the Battle of Las Taironas. It also had positive effects on the military order for Havana, by increasing morale of the Mambises in the region and facilitating the structuring of the Second Division.

During the campaign, Gómez captured hundreds of weapons and horses and thousands of cartridges. He suffered dead and wounded, including himself among the latter; But the invasion had reached Mantua, Maceo had returned to Havana, and the war had reached a nation-wide scale.
