= Emilio de Molíns =

102nd and 104th Governor-General of the Philippines
- In office April 1, 1885 – April 4, 1885
- Monarch: Alfonso XII
- Preceded by: Joaquín Jovellar
- Succeeded by: Emilio Terrero y Perinat
- In office March 10, 1883 – April 7, 1883
- Monarch: Alfonso XII
- Preceded by: Fernando Primo de Rivera
- Succeeded by: Joaquín Jovellar

Personal details
- Born: February 3, 1824 Mahón, Balearic Islands, Spain
- Died: March 27, 1889 (aged 65) Madrid, Spain

Military service
- Allegiance: Kingdom of Spain
- Rank: Segundo cabo de ejército de tierra de españa

Emilio de Molíns y Lemaur (February 3, 1824 – March 27, 1889) was a former military officer of rank lance corporal (Spanish: cabo segundo) of Spanish army in the Philippines. From March 10 to April 7, 1883, he temporarily served as the 102nd governor and captain-general of the Philippines after the reappointment of Fernándo Primo de Rivera. He was succeeded by Joaquín Jovellar, and thereafter came back into office again as ad interim 104th governor and captain-general from April 1 to April 4, 1885.

Political offices
Preceded by Fernando Primo de Rivera	Governor and Captain-General of the Philippines; 1883	Succeeded by Joaquín Jovellar
Preceded by Joaquín Jovellar	Governor and Captain-General of the Philippines; 1885	Succeeded by Emilio Terrero y Perinat
