= Miguel Primo de Rivera y Sáenz de Heredia =

Spanish aristocrat, lawyer, politician and diplomat

The Most Excellent The Duke of Primo de Rivera GE
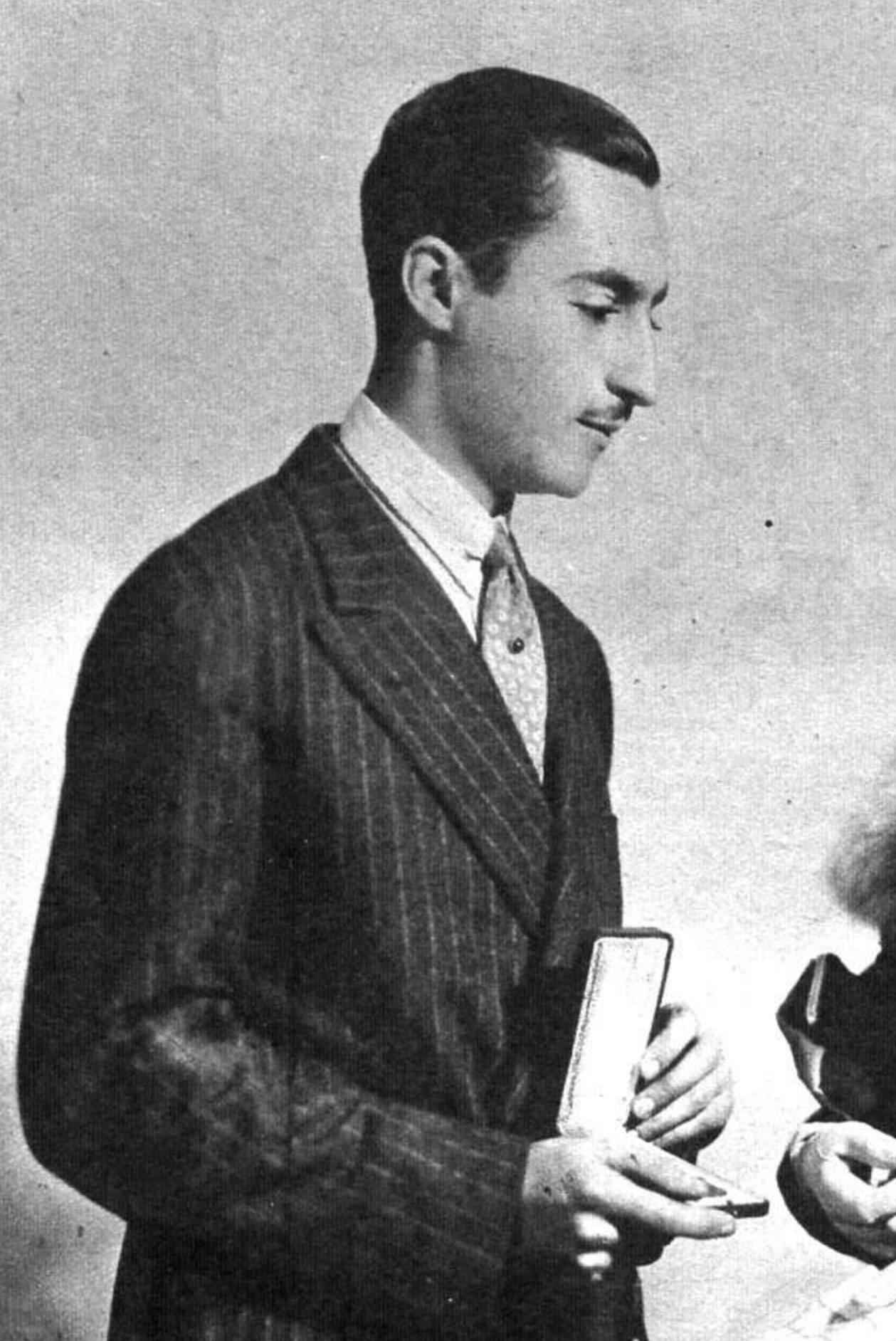

Ambassador of Spain to the United Kingdom
- In office 1951–1958
- Leader: Francisco Franco
- Preceded by: José Ruiz de Arana y Bauer
- Succeeded by: José Fernández-Villaverde

Mayor of Jerez de la Frontera
- In office 1947–1948

Minister of Agriculture
- In office 19 May 1941 – 20 July 1945
- Preceded by: Joaquín Benjumea Burín
- Succeeded by: Carlos Rein Segura

Personal details
- Born: Miguel Primo de Rivera y Sáenz de Heredia; 11 July 1904 San Sebastian, Basque Country, Spain
- Died: 8 May 1964 (aged 59) Madrid, Spain
- Resting place: San Isidro del Campo
- Party: MES (1933); FE (1933-1934); FE de las JONS (1934-1937); FET y de las JONS (1937-1964)
- Spouse: Margarita de Larios y Fernández de Villavicencio
- Parent: Miguel Primo de Rivera (father)
- Education: Universidad Central de Madrid
- Occupation: Lawyer

Miguel Primo de Rivera y Sáenz de Heredia, 2nd Duke of Primo de Rivera, 4th Marquis of Estella (11 July 1904 – 8 May 1964) was a Spanish aristocrat, lawyer, politician and diplomat. He was the second son of the dictator Miguel Primo de Rivera y Orbaneja and younger brother of the founder of the Falange Española, José Antonio Primo de Rivera.

He studied law at Universidad Central de Madrid and was called to the bar in Cádiz. Following World War II, he was Spanish Ambassador to the United Kingdom and mayor of Jerez de la Frontera (1947–1948).

After his death, his nephew Miguel Primo de Rivera y Urquijo (son of his brother Fernando Primo de Rivera y Sáenz de Heredia) assumed the titles of duke and marquis.

Political offices
Preceded by Joaquín Benjumea	Minister of Agriculture; 1941–1945	Succeeded by Carlos Rein
Diplomatic posts
Preceded by José Ruiz de Arana	Ambassador of Spain to the United Kingdom; 1951–1958	Succeeded by José Fernández-Villaverde
Spanish nobility
Preceded by José Antonio Primo de Rivera	Marquis of Estella; 1936–1948	Succeeded by Miguel Primo de Rivera y Urquijo
Preceded by José Antonio Primo de Rivera (posthumous title)	Duke of Primo de Rivera; 1948–1964	Succeeded by Miguel Primo de Rivera y Urquijo
