= Arsenio Martínez Campos =

Spanish general and politician (1831–1900)

The Most Excellent Arsenio Martínez-Campos
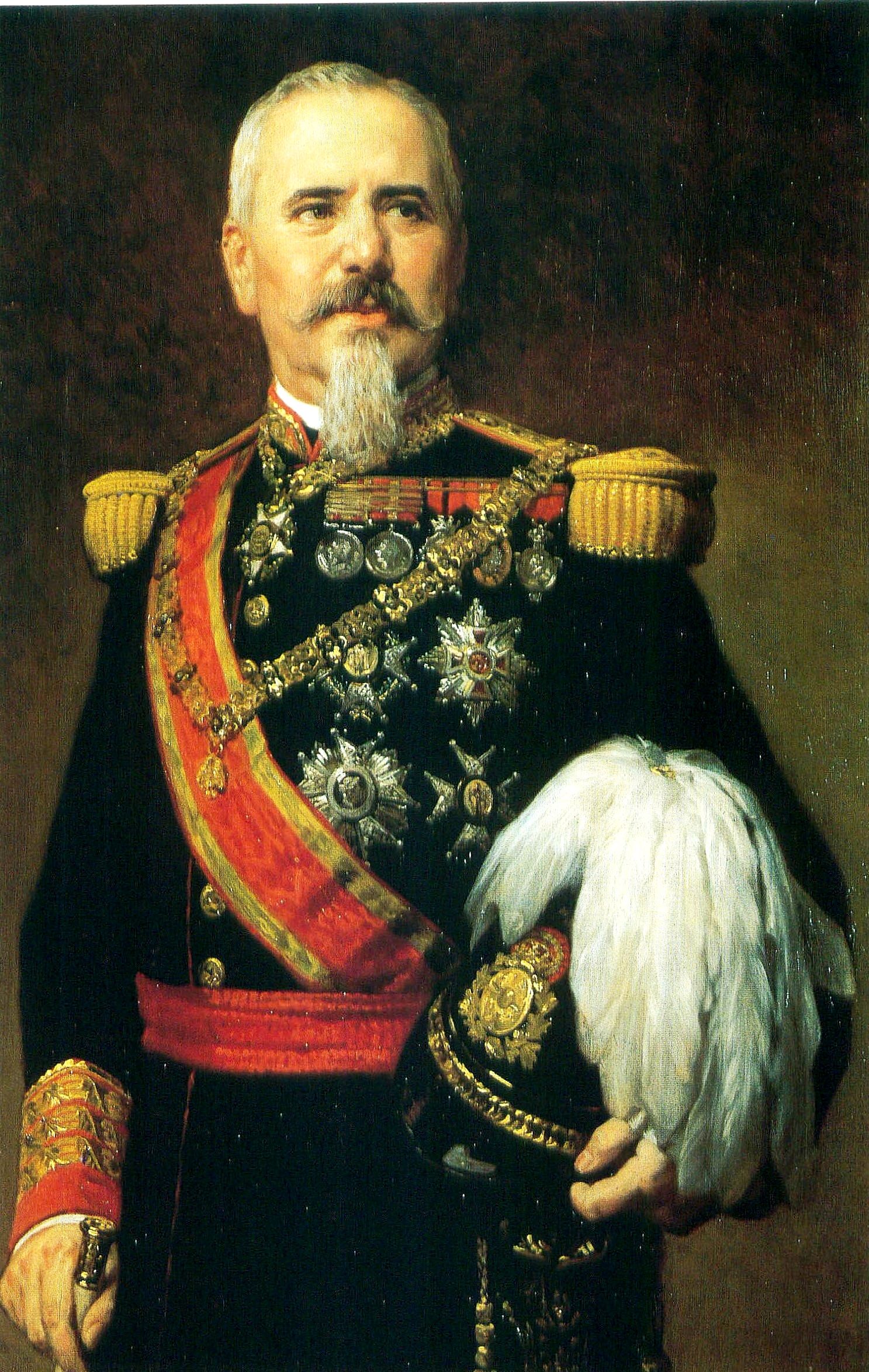
- Portrait of General Martínez-Campos, c. 1889

Prime Minister of Spain
- In office 7 March – 9 December 1879
- Monarch: Alfonso XII
- Preceded by: Antonio Cánovas del Castillo
- Succeeded by: Antonio Cánovas del Castillo

President of the Senate of Spain
- In office 23 December 1885 – 8 March 1886
- Monarch: Alfonso XIII
- Preceded by: Count of Puñonrrostro
- Succeeded by: Marquess of Havana
- In office 27 February 1891 – 4 February 1893
- Monarch: Alfonso XIII
- Preceded by: Marquess of Habana
- Succeeded by: Marquess of Habana
- In office 30 May 1899 – 18 October 1900
- Monarch: Alfonso XIII
- Preceded by: Eugenio Montero Ríos
- Succeeded by: Marcelo Azcárraga Palmero

Minister of War of Spain
- In office 7 March – 9 December 1879
- Monarch: Alfonso XII
- Prime Minister: Himself
- Preceded by: Francisco de Ceballos y Vargas
- Succeeded by: José Ignacio de Echavarría
- In office 8 February 1881 – 13 October 1883
- Monarch: Alfonso XII
- Prime Minister: Práxedes Mateo Sagasta
- Preceded by: José Ignacio de Echavarría
- Succeeded by: José López Domínguez

Minister of the Navy of Spain
- In office 9 January – 13 January 1883
- Monarch: Alfonso XII
- Prime Minister: Práxedes Mateo Sagasta
- Preceded by: Francisco de Paula Pavía
- Succeeded by: Rafael Rodríguez Arias

Captain General of Cuba
- In office 16 April 1895 – 20 January 1896
- Monarch: Alfonso XIII
- Regent: Maria Christina of Austria
- Prime Minister: Antonio Cánovas del Castillo
- Minister of Overseas: Tomás Castellano y Villarroya
- Preceded by: Emilio Calleja
- Succeeded by: Sabas Marín
- In office 18 June 1878 – 5 February 1879
- Monarch: Alfonso XII
- Prime Minister: Antonio Cánovas del Castillo
- Minister of Overseas: Cristóbal Martín de Herrera
- Preceded by: Joaquín Jovellar
- Succeeded by: Cayetano Figueroa

Captain General of Catalonia
- In office 5 December 1873 – 19 January 1874
- President of the Executive Power: Emilio Castelar; Francisco Serrano
- Minister of War: José Sánchez Bregua; Juan Zavala de la Puente
- Preceded by: José Turón y Prats
- Succeeded by: Rafael Izquierdo y Gutiérrez
- In office 31 December 1874 – 10 October 1876
- Monarch: Alfonso XII
- Prime Minister: Antonio Cánovas del Castillo; Joaquín Jovellar
- President of the Ministry-Regency: Antonio Cánovas del Castillo
- Minister of War: Joaquín Jovellar; Francisco de Ceballos y Vargas
- Preceded by: José López Domínguez
- Succeeded by: Marquess of Peña Plata
- In office 23 July – 14 November 1890
- Monarch: Alfonso XIII
- Regent: Maria Christina of Austria
- Prime Minister: Antonio Cánovas del Castillo
- Minister of War: Marcelo Azcárraga Palmero
- Preceded by: Marquess of Peña Plata
- Succeeded by: Marquess of Peña Plata
- In office 9 March – 29 November 1873
- President of the Executive Power: Estanislao Figueras; Francisco Pi i Margall; Nicolás Salmerón; Emilio Castelar
- Minister of War: Juan Costa Muñoz; Ramón Nouvilas; Estanislao Figueras (as interim); Nicolás Estévanez; Eulogio González Íscar; Jacobo Oreiro y Villavicencio (as interim); José Sánchez Bregua
- Preceded by: Marquess of Peña Plata
- Succeeded by: Valeriano Weyler

Captain General of Valencia
- In office 18 July – 5 December 1873
- President of the Executive Power: Francisco Serrano
- Minister of War: Fernando Cotoner y Chacón (as interim); Francisco Serrano Bedoya
- Preceded by: José García y Velarde
- Succeeded by: Francisco de Ceballos y Vargas

Personal details
- Born: Arsenio Martínez y Campos; 14 December 1831 Segovia, Spain
- Died: September 23, 1900 (aged 68) Zarauz, Spain
- Party: Liberal Party (from 1880)
- Other political affiliations: Conservative Party (until 1880)
- Profession: Spanish Armed Forces

Military service
- Allegiance: Spain
- Branch/service: Spanish Army
- Years of service: 1860 – 1896
- Rank: General de ejército
- Battles/wars: Tetuán War; Glorious Revolution; Ten Years' War; Third Carlist War; Cuban War of Independence: First Eastern Campaign; Battle of Peralejo; Invasion from East to West in Cuba; Lanzadera Campaign

Arsenio Martínez-Campos y Antón (né Martínez y Campos; 14 December 1831 – 23 September 1900), was a Spanish officer who rose against the First Spanish Republic in a military revolution in 1874 and restored Spain's Bourbon dynasty. Later, he became Captain-General of Cuba where he was tasked with stopping pro-independence rebels. Martínez Campos took part in wars in Africa, Mexico and Cuba and in the Third Carlist War.

== Education and early military career ==
In 1860, he was sent to Africa to take part in the Tetuán War in Morocco, and distinguished himself in 16 actions, obtaining the Cross of San Fernando and the rank of lieutenant colonel. He also took part in the second French intervention in Mexico under General Juan Prim in a joint expedition along with France and Britain.

== Ten Years' War ==
After the Revolution of 1868, Martínez Campos requested a posting to Cuba, where he fought against the rebels in 1869 in the Ten Years' War, gaining the rank of brigadier general. Success in this war was often a matter of perception. The Spanish Army, after taking massive losses, would take the field in bayonet charges.

Despite winning tactical victories, the Spanish losses against the Cuban rebels would make the Cubans consider the action to be a victory for the body count and then withdraw. The Cubans also knew that movements of Spanish in the field raised the exposure of the Spanish forces to yellow fever and other tropical diseases, which would hurt the enemy even further. Perceived as too soft to win, he was displaced by Blas Villate, Count of Balmaceda, who proceeded with a brutal campaign.

== Political and military intrigue in Spain ==
In 1872, Martínez Campos returned to Spain and supported the coup d'état led by Manuel Pavía. There, he commanded several brigades against the Carlist uprisings with little success. He was later placed in charge of the Valencian army, where he fought independent forces in Alicante and Cartagena.

The chaotic situation in Spain pushed him to plot against the Spanish Republic in favor of restoring Alfonso XII, the son of the exiled Queen Isabella II.

Although he made little effort to hide his monarchist intentions, Marshal Serranoappointed him to command of a division in 1874. WIth it, he took part in the relief of Bilbao on 2 May and in the operations around Estella-Lizarra in June. On both occasions he unsuccessfully attempted to persuade fellow commanders to proclaim Alfonso XII. He was placed under surveillance in Ávila but managed to escape and took refuge in Madrid.

On 29 December 1874, Martínez Campos led a coup d'état in Sagunto that restored the Bourbon monarchy under Alfonso XII. Following this, he was appointed Captain General of Catalonia, where he defeated the Carlists and ended the civil war, as well as in Navarre during the early Restoration period.

== Governor of Cuba ==
He was made captain general (governor) of Cuba in 1876. His reputation as a noble warrior allowed him to arrange a peace treaty (Paz de Zanjón) with the war-weary Cuban rebels in 1878. The treaty granted more autonomy to Cuba and freedom to rebels who had been slaves, and, a few years afterward, it led to the complete abolition of slavery on the island.

Returning to Spain, after presiding over a conservative government in 1879 as Cánovas's puppet, he was forced to leave the Conservative Party since he favoured granting total freedom to all races in Spain.

He turned to the Liberals. As Minister for War under Sagasta, he founded the General Military Academy. After the death of King Alfonso in 1885, Martínez Campos steadily supported the regency of Queen Maria Christina and held high commands but declined to take office.

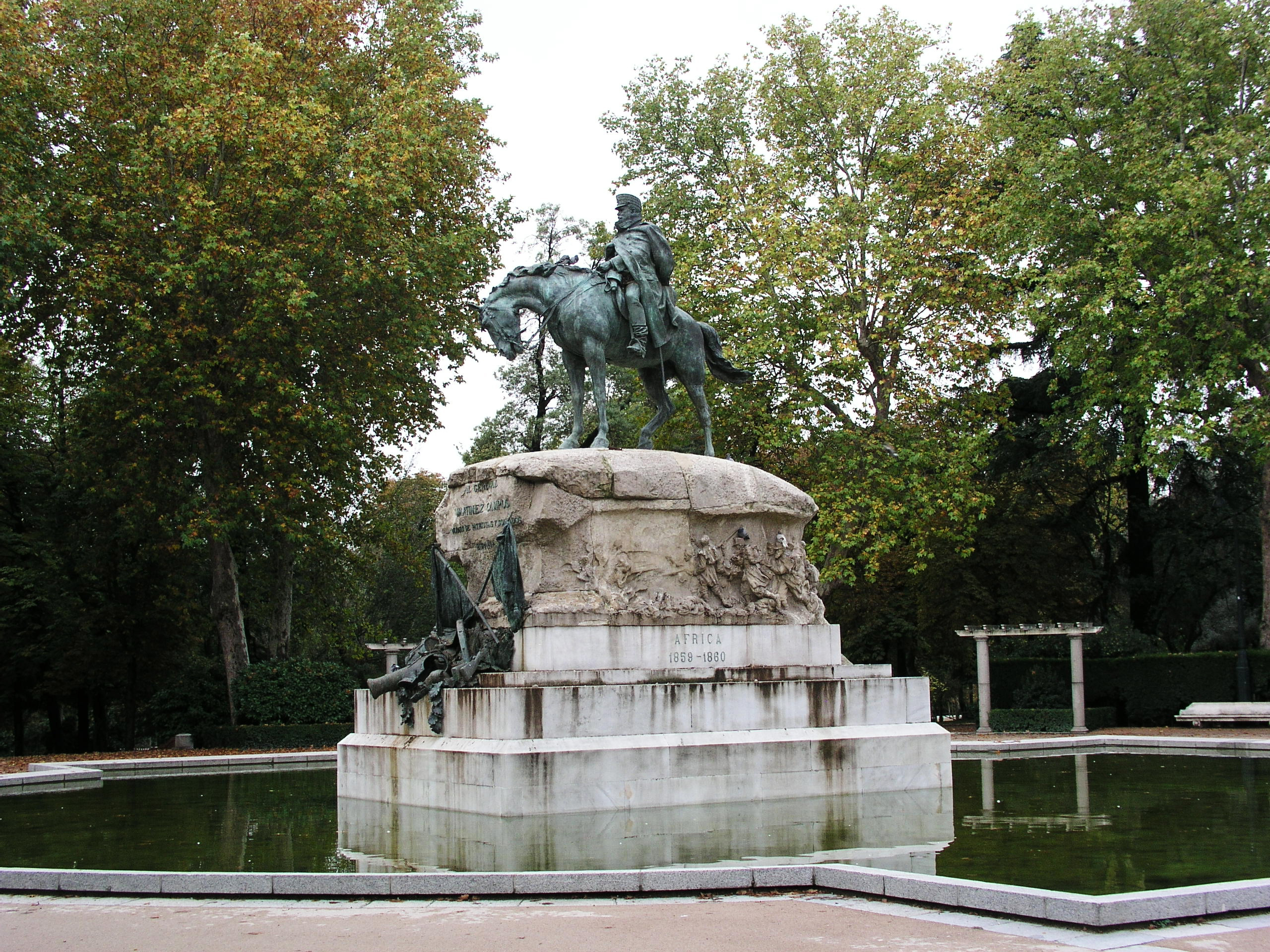
Monument to Martínez-Campos in Madrid (M. Benlliure, 1907).

== Cuban War of Independence ==
Two years later at age 53, he was sent to Cuba as the first general to face down a Cuban attempt at independence. His campaign faced difficulties from the very beginning, with much of the imperial force suffering from malaria and yellow fever during the first summer in the swamps. Moreover, the insurgents' use of dynamite and ambush proved effective in pushing back against the superior numbers of the Spanish force. After months of rebel raids and the capture of poorly defended towns, Campos attempted to force a decisive engagement in July.

The battle ended in a humiliating defeat for the Spanish, whose troops fled the field in the face of the rebels more advanced tactics. With increasing pressure from both the rebels and his own government, Campos began considering more extreme measures. Facing an incorrectly perceived need to toughen measures against the rebels, he refused to authorize ethnic cleansing. Instead, he resigned his post and was replaced by Valeriano Weyler.

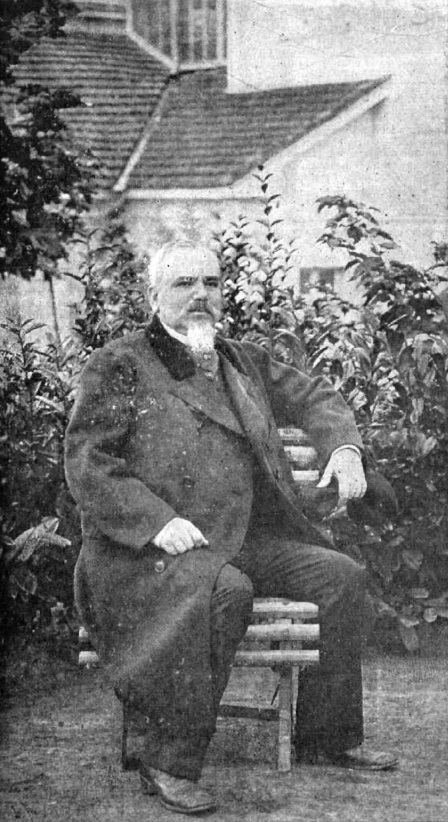
Photograph of General Martínez-Campos in his old age, c. 1891

Days after the defeat, Campos sent a letter to the Spanish prime minister outlining a strategy to ‘reconcentrate’ hundreds of thousands of rural Cubans behind trenches and barbed wire in Spanish-held towns. The plan aimed to isolate the insurgents and cut off the widespread rural support that had sustained them throughout the war. However, Campos refused to implement the policy himself or to escalate the conflict further, and offered to relinquish his imperial post.

== Return to Spain and death ==
Martínez Campos returned to Spain, where he was named president of the Supreme War and Navy Council but resigned after a month in office. He died on September 23, 1900, at Zarauz.

== Sources ==
- Anon. (1906) Monumento al general Martínez Campos, Madrid : Establecimiento Tipografico "El Trabajo", 580 p.
- Navarro Martin, Antonio (1878) Opúsculo sobre la Pacificacion de Cuba, acompañado ... de los festejos de la paz y biografía ... de su ilustre pacificador ... D. Arsenio Martinez de Campos, México, 78 p.
- Tone, John Lawrence (2006) War and genocide in Cuba, 1895–1898, Chapel Hill : University of North Carolina Press, ISBN 0-8078-3006-2
