= Adelardo López de Ayala y Herrera =

Spanish writer and politician (1828–1879)

The Most Excellent Adelardo López de Ayala
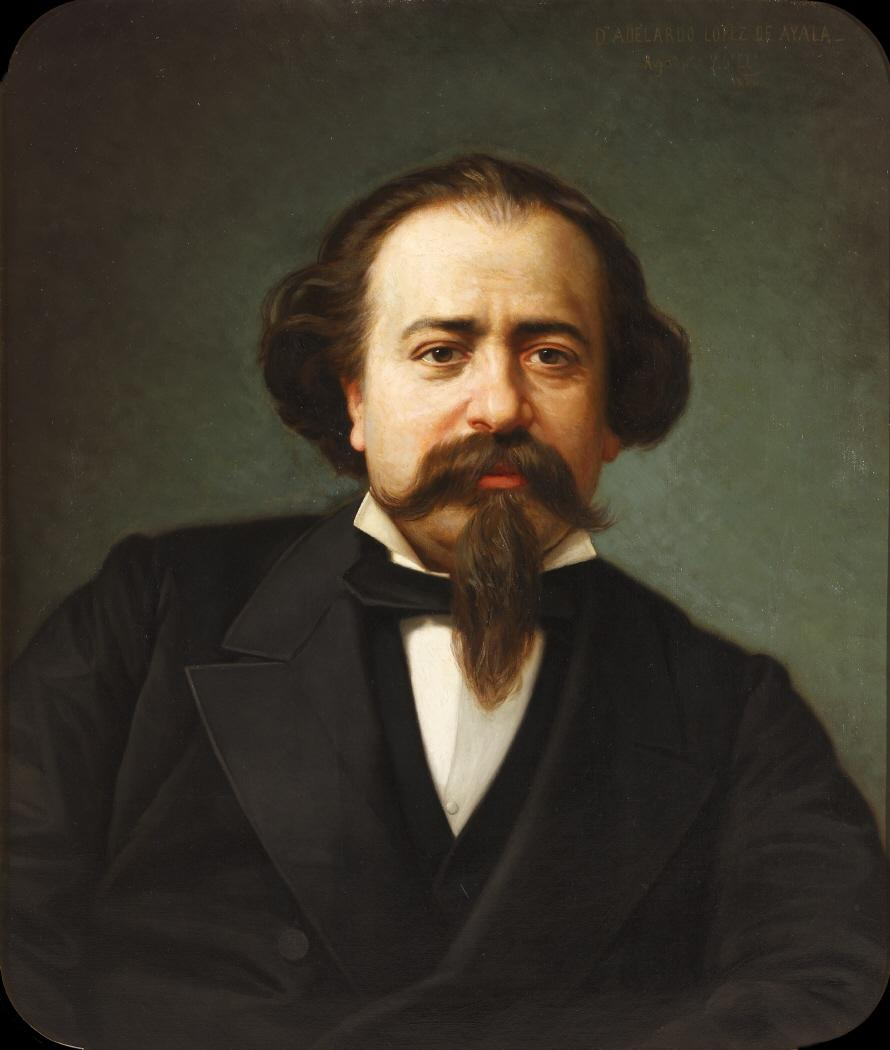

Minister of Overseas
- In office 8 October 1868 – 18 June 1869
- Preceded by: Tomás Rodríguez Rubí
- Succeeded by: Juan Bautista Topete
- In office 27 December 1870 – 24 July 1871
- Preceded by: Segismundo Moret
- Succeeded by: Tomás Mosquera
- In office 26 May 1872 – 13 June 1872
- Preceded by: Cristóbal Martín de Herrera
- Succeeded by: Eduardo Gasset y Artime
- In office 31 December 1874 – 15 January 1877
- Preceded by: Antonio Romero Ortiz
- Succeeded by: Cristóbal Martín de Herrera

Seat f of the Real Academia Española
- In office 25 March 1870 – 30 December 1879
- Preceded by: Antonio Alcalá Galiano
- Succeeded by: Gabino Tejado

Personal details
- Born: Adelardo López de Ayala y Herrera; 1 May 1828 Guadalcanal, Spain
- Died: 30 December 1879 (aged 51) Madrid, Spain

Adelardo López de Ayala y Herrera (1 May 1828 – 30 December 1879) was a Spanish writer and politician.

== Life ==
He was born at Guadalcanal, Seville on 1 May 1828, and at a very early age began writing for the theatre of his native town. The titles of these juvenile performances, which were played by amateurs, were Salga por donde saliere, Me voy a Sevilla and La Corona y el Fugal. As travelling companies never visited Guadalcanal, and as ladies took no part in the representations, these three plays were written for men only. Ayala persuaded his sister to appear as the heroine of his comedy, La Primera Dama, and the innovation if it scandalized some of his townsmen, permitted him to develop his talent more freely.

In his twentieth year he matriculated at the University of Seville, but his career as a student was undistinguished. In Seville he made acquaintance with García Gutiérrez, who is reported to have encouraged his dramatic ambitions and to have given him the benefit of his own experience as a playwright. Early in 1850, Ayala removed his name from the university books, and settled in Madrid with the purpose of becoming a professional dramatist. Though he had no friends and no influence, he speedily found an opening. A four-act play in verse, Un Hombre de Estado, was accepted by the managers of the Teatro Español, was given on 25 January 1851, and proved a remarkable success.

Henceforward Ayala's position and popularity were secure. Within a year he became more widely known by his Castigo y Perdón, and by a more humorous effort, Los Dos Guzmanes; and shortly afterwards he was appointed by the Moderado (moderate) government to a post in the home office, which he lost in 1854 on the succession to power of the Liberal party.

In 1854 he produced Rioja, perhaps the most admired and the most admirable of all his works, and from 1854 to 1856 he took an active part in the political campaign carried on in the journal El Padre Cobos. A zarzuela entitled Guerra a Muerte, for which Emilio Arrieta composed the music, belongs to 1855, and to the same collaboration is due El Agente de Matrimonios.

At about this date Ayala passed over from the Moderates to the Progressives, and this political maneuver had its effect upon the fate of his plays. The performances of Los Comuneros were attended by members of the different parties; the utterances of the different characters were taken to represent the author's personal opinions, and every speech which could be brought into connection with current politics was applauded by one half of the house and derided by the other half.

A zarzuela named El Conde de Castralla was given amid much uproar on 20 February 1856, and, as the piece seemed likely to cause serious disorder in the theatre, it was suppressed by the government after the third performance. Ayala's rupture with the Moderates was now complete, and in 1857, through the interest of General Leopoldo O'Donnell, he was elected as Liberal deputy for Badajoz.

His political changes are difficult to follow or explain, and they have been unsparingly censured. So far as can be judged, Ayala had no strong political views, and drifted with the current of the moment.

He took part in the revolution of 1868, wrote the Manifesto of Cadiz, took office as colonial minister, favored the candidature of Antoine, Duke of Montpensier, resigned in 1871, returned to his early conservative principles, and was a member of Alfonso XII's first cabinet. Meanwhile, however divided in opinion as to his political conduct, his countrymen were practically unanimous in admiring his dramatic work; and his reputation, if it gained little by El Nuevo Don Juan, was greatly increased by El Tanto por Ciento and El Tejado de Vidrio. His last play, Consuelo, was given on 30 March 1878. Ayala was nominated to the post of president of the congress shortly before his death, which occurred unexpectedly on 30 January 1879.
