= Battle of Las Taironas =

Part of the Cuban War of Independence (1896)

- Part of Cuban War of Independence and Invasion from East to West in Cuba
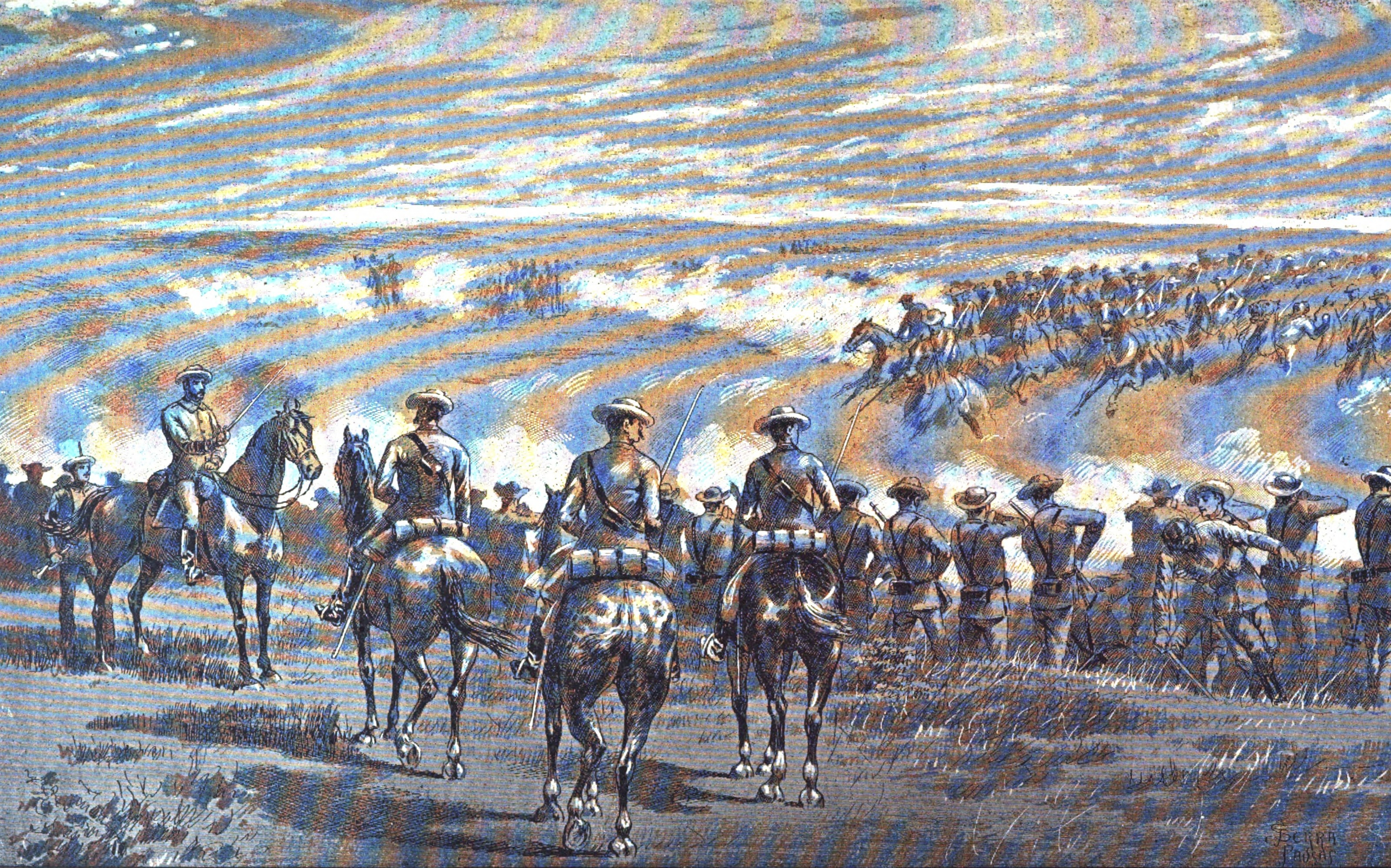
- Illustration of the battle by Joán Serra y Pausas (1896)
Date	January 17, 1896
Location	Pinar del Río, Pinar del Río Province, Cuba
Result	Cuban victory

Belligerents
Cuban rebels	Spain

Commanders and leaders
Antonio Maceo	Ulpiano Sánchez Echevarría

Units involved
Céspedes Regiment; Las Villas Regiment	Baza Battalion; Isabel la Católica Regiment

Strength
1,560 Mambises	520 Infantry

Casualties and losses
12 killed, 49 Wounded	Source 1: 48 – 200 killed and wounded Source 2: 400 killed and wounded

The Battle of Las Taironas was a battle of the Cuban War of Independence that took place on January 17, 1896 at Pinar del Río between Cuban forces led by Major General Antonio Maceo and the Spanish led by lieutenant colonel Ulpiano Sanchez Echevarria who was a Cuban native.

== Background ==
Within the period of the Invasion from East to West in Cuba, Antonio Maceo; After separating from Máximo Gómez in La Habana Province, he continued his march to the westernmost end of the province of Pinar del Río with the aim of reaching the end of the invasion. After a series of defeats, the Spanish command, led by Arsenio Martínez Campos, sought one last action to stop Maceo, an occasion that appeared in the town of Las Taironas.

== The Battle ==
During the course of the battle, the Spanish hosts were repelled, leaving, in a field covered with dead and wounded and the Mambi troops opening the doors for the end of the invasion. The Cuban revolutionaries suffered a major loss during the fighting however as Dr. Federico de la Torre y Latte was killed in action.

== Aftermath ==
The Cuban rebels captured 45 mules from the Spanish. As a result of this failure, which together with the arrival of Maceo to Guane on January 22, 1896, Captain General Martínez Campos was forced to submit his resignation.
