= Carlos Rein =

Spanish politician

The Most Excellent Carlos Rein OLSM
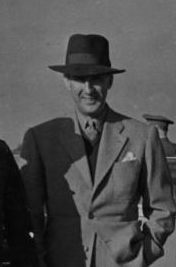
- Pictured in a partridge hunt, ca. 1952

Minister of Agriculture
- In office 20 July 1945 – 20 July 1951
- Leader: Francisco Franco
- Preceded by: The Duke of Primo de Rivera
- Succeeded by: Rafael Cavestany

Personal details
- Born: Carlos Rein Segura; 18 July 1897 Málaga, Spain
- Died: 11 February 1992 (aged 94) Madrid, Spain

Carlos Rein Segura, OLSM (18 July 1897 – 11 February 1992) was a Spanish politician who served as Minister of Agriculture during the Francoist regime, from 1945 to 1951. He was a member of FET y de las JONS.

== Early years ==
Born in Málaga on 18 July 1897, he came from a family of the upper mercantile bourgeoisie. He studied agricultural engineering and entered the administration, being framed by the National Corps of Agricultural Engineers of the Ministry of Finance.

He carried out functions in the Board of Colonization and Interior Repopulation, serving in the agricultural colonies of the Galleon, in Cazalla de la Sierra and Cañamero. In the first town he was appointed mayor during the dictatorship of Primo de Rivera. Later he held another political position, that of president of the Partial Committee of Charter and Unloading of the Port of Málaga.

After the dictator fell, he was attached to the Málaga Agronomic Section, being promoted that same year in 1929 to director of the Málaga Tobacco Fermentation Center. His career path would already be closely related to this crop.

== War period ==
During the republican period, he adopted a discreet position on political matters. He intervened as an auditor in the 1931 elections and in the 1936 elections, supporting the right-wing forces. He joined Falange Española de las JONS. At the outbreak of the Spanish Civil War, he was deposed, detained and imprisoned on the Marqués de Chávarri prison ship, where he remained until February 8, 1937, when Málaga was taken by the Francoist army. The intervention of the Consul of Mexico in Málaga, taking an interest in his situation and that of other political prisoners, allowed him to delay looking at his cause and saving his life.

The new authorities appointed him manager of the first Town Hall, president of the Official Agricultural Chamber and in May 1938, provincial union delegate in the province, a position in which he remained until May 1941. He was a Falangist from José Luis Arrese's circle. Appointed chief engineer of Tobacco Culture and Fermentation, he moved to Madrid.

Once in the capital, he was elected a member of the political secretariat of the General Secretariat of the Party and in November 1941, he was appointed deputy national secretary for Economic Planning of the National Delegation of Trade Unions. Already in the Ministry of Agriculture, he was Director of the National Union of Tobacco Cultivated, General Director of Supplies and Transport and Undersecretary of Agriculture.

== Francoist period ==
On July 20, 1945, he was appointed minister of agriculture. During his term, the Law dated April 27, 1946, which regulated the expropriation of rustic farms for social interest, and the Law dated April 21, 1949, which promoted the colonization and distribution of property in irrigable areas. It also promoted the Institute of Animal Biology and the Institute of Livestock Artificial Insemination was created. A vigorous hunter, he helped and encouraged the founding of the Junta Nacional de Homologación de Trofeos de Caza during his office.

After his ministerial stage, he held other positions in the administration. Thus, he was again responsible for the National Tobacco Cultivation Service.

He was solicitor in Cortes by reason of his charges, between March 16, 1943 and April 14, 1958 and by designation of Francisco Franco between May 31, 1961 and November 11, 1967.

His career ended in private business. He was vice president of the Industria Cervecera Sevillana. He maintained his position with the world of tobacco, first as vice president in Tabacalera representing public capital in the period 1971-1973 and then in the same position, representing private capital until 1979. He was also linked to John Deere Ibérica, being appointed in May 1974 honorific chairman. During this time, he was also president of the General Council of Colleges of Agricultural Technical Engineers and Agricultural Experts of the State. He was also a director of Banco Urquijo, Rural and Mediterranean, Western and Foreign banks.

He was always very close to his city of origin and so in 1958 he promoted the creation of the Casa de Málaga in Madrid.

Rein was profoundly decorated. In relation to the Civil War, he was granted the Medal of Suffering for the Homeland and Campaign Medal in the Rear. Related to his political and professional activity, he was awarded the Grand Cross of the Order of Charles III, the Grand Cross of the Order of Isabella the Catholic, the medal for Agricultural Merit and the Orden del Mérito Civil. Internationally, he was granted the Order of the Liberator General San Martín and the Order of Boyacá.

== Selected works ==
- La electrificación agrícola y sus posibilidades: Conferencia pronunciada en el Círculo de la Unión Mercantil de Madrid (Madrid, 1945)

== See also ==
- Francoist repression

== Bibliography ==
- Arasa, Daniel (2008). Historias curiosas del franquismo. Barcelona: Ediciones Robinbook.
- del Arco, Manuel (1970). Los 90 ministros de Franco (in Spanish). Dopesa.
- Urquijo y Goitia, José Ramón de (2008). Gobiernos y ministros españoles en la edad contemporánea (2ª ed.). Madrid: CSIC. ISBN 978-84-00-08737-1.
