= Marquis of Estella =

Marquessate of Estella
- Creation date: 25 May 1877
- Created by: Alfonso XII
- First holder: Fernando Primo de Rivera y Sobremonte, 1st Marquess of Estella
- Present holder: Fernando María Primo de Rivera y Oriol, 6th Marquess of Estella
- Remainder to: Heirs of the body of the grantee

Marquis of Estella (Spanish: Marqués de Estella) is a hereditary title of Spanish nobility, accompanied by the dignity of Grandee. It was created on 25 May 1877 by King Alfonso XII in favor of Fernando Primo de Rivera, a prominent military officer and politician.

== List of Holders ==
- Fernando Primo de Rivera y Sobremonte, 1st Marquis of Estella (1831-1921)
- Miguel Primo de Rivera y Orbaneja, 2nd Marquis of Estella (1870-1930)
- José Antonio Primo de Rivera y Sáenz de Heredia, 3rd Marquis of Estella (1903-1936)
- Miguel Primo de Rivera y Sáenz de Heredia, 4th Marquis of Estella (1904-1964)
- Miguel Primo de Rivera y Urquijo, 5th Marquis of Estella (1934-2018)
- Fernando Primo de Rivera y Oriol, 6th Marquis of Estella (b. 1962)

== Family tree ==
José Primo de Rivera y Ortiz de Pinedo; 1777–1853
Miguel Primo de Rivera; 1826–1898 | Fernando Primo de Rivera, 1st Marquess of Estella; 1831–1921
Miguel Primo de Rivera, 2nd Marquess of Estella; 1870–1930
José Antonio Primo de Rivera, 3rd Marquess of Estella; 1903–1936 | Miguel Primo de Rivera, 4th Marquess of Estella; 1904–1964 | Fernando Primo de Rivera y Sáenz de Heredia; 1908–1936
Miguel Primo de Rivera, 5th Marquess of Estella; 1934–2018
Fernando Primo de Rivera, 6th Marquess of Estella; 1962
