= Ministry of Overseas (Spain) =

- Ministerio de Ultramar
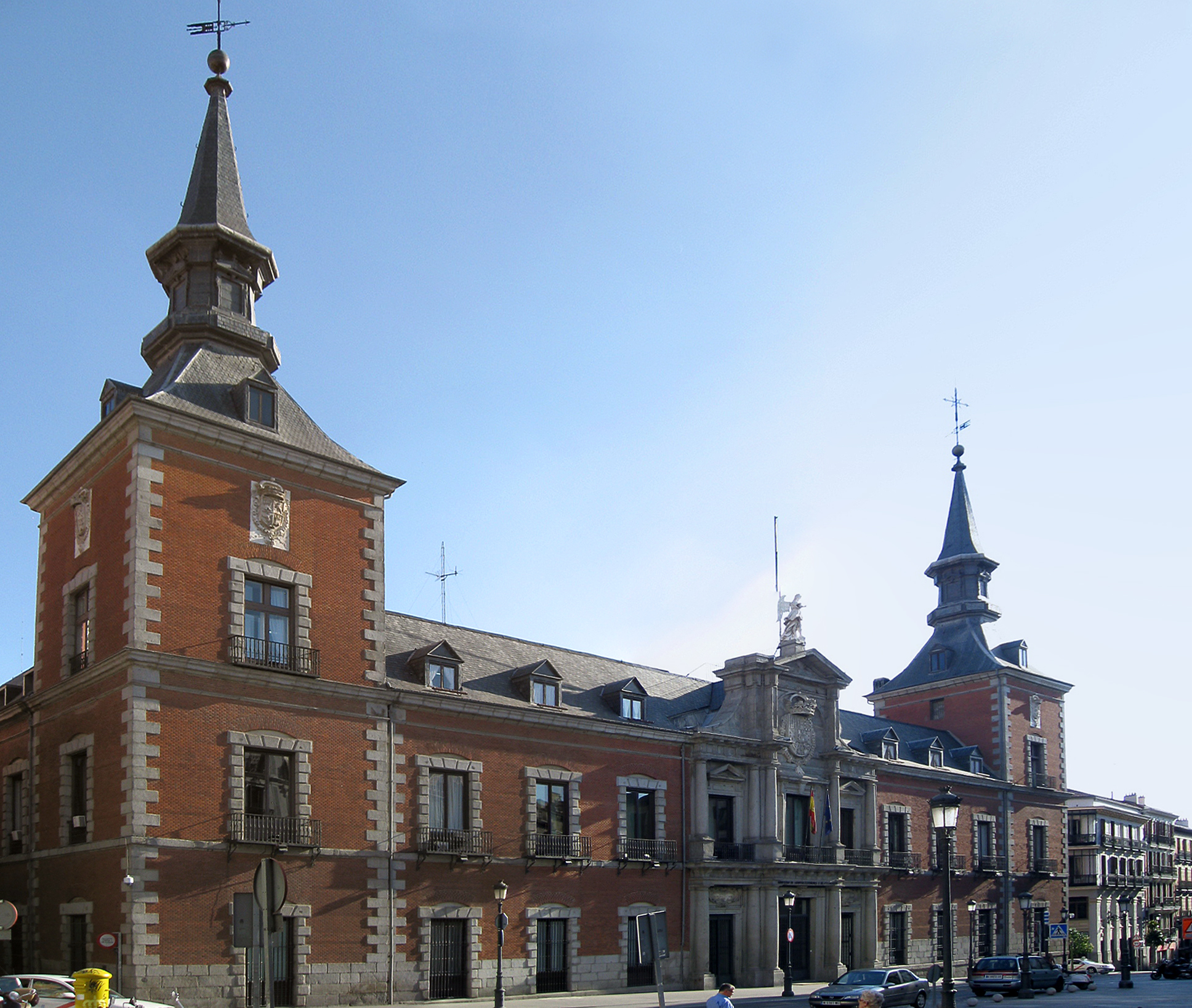
- Main headquarters from 1885 to 1889

Agency overview
- Formed: 1812 (first time); 1863 (second time)
- Preceding agency: Directorate-General for Overseas Governance
- Dissolved: 1814 (first time); 1898 (second time)
- Type: Ministry
- Jurisdiction: Government of Spain
- Headquarters: Santa Cruz Palace (Madrid)

The Ministry of Overseas, Ministry of Overseas Affairs, Ministry of Overseas Territories (Spanish Ministerio de Ultramar), or simply, Ultramar, was the ministerial department in charge of the direction of Spanish territories between 1863 and 1899. It administered the Philippines, Cuba, Puerto Rico, Santo Domingo and the Carolinas, Marianas and Palaos.

Prior to its establishment, the administration of the colonies was in charge of the Ministry of the Navy. By a royal decree of 20 May 1863 responsibility for the colonies was transferred to a new department. Following Spanish–American War of 1898, in which Spain lost the greater part of her colonial territory (Cuba, Guam, Puerto Rico and the Philippines), and the sale of her remaining Pacific possessions to Germany by the treaty of 12 February 1899, the Overseas Ministry itself was suppressed in a royal decree of 20 April 1899.

The creation of a Spanish protectorate in Morocco in 1912, and the establishment of Spanish control over its Guinean possessions, a new colonial department, the Direccion General de Marruecos y Colonias (Directorate-General for Morocco and the Colonies), was set up in 1925. After recognizing the independence of Morocco in 1956, its name was changed to Direccion General de Plazas y Provincias Africanas (Directorate-General for African Territories and Provinces). In 1969, following the independence of Equatorial Guinea, its remit was once again reduced and it became the Direccion General de Promoción del Sahara (Directorate-General for Sahara Promotion), charged with the advancement of Spanish Sahara until 1975.

== List of ministers ==
Period	Beginning	End	Name	Government
Reign of Isabella II (1833–1868)
Reign of Isabella II (1833–1868)	21 May 1863	18 July 1863	José Gutiérrez de la Concha	Manuel Pando Fernández de Pinedo
Reign of Isabella II (1833–1868)	18 July 1863	1 August 1863	Manuel Moreno López	Manuel Pando Fernández de Pinedo
Reign of Isabella II (1833–1868)	1 August 1863	6 August 1863	José Gutiérrez de la Concha	Manuel Pando Fernández de Pinedo
Reign of Isabella II (1833–1868)	6 August 1863	29 November 1863	Francisco Permanyer Tuyets	Manuel Pando Fernández de Pinedo
Reign of Isabella II (1833–1868)	29 November 1863	17 January 1864	José Gutiérrez de la Concha	Manuel Pando Fernández de Pinedo
Reign of Isabella II (1833–1868)	17 January 1864	1 March 1864	Alejandro de Castro Casal	Lorenzo Arrazola
Reign of Isabella II (1833–1868)	1 March 1864	16 September 1864	Diego López Ballesteros	Alejandro Mon y Menéndez
Reign of Isabella II (1833–1868)	16 September 1864	21 June 1865	Manuel Seijas Lozano	Ramón María Narváez
Reign of Isabella II (1833–1868)	21 June 1865	10 July 1866	Antonio Cánovas del Castillo	Leopoldo O'Donnell
Reign of Isabella II (1833–1868)	10 July 1866	27 October 1867	Alejandro de Castro Casal	Ramón María Narváez
Reign of Isabella II (1833–1868)	27 October 1867	23 April 1868	Carlos Marfori y Callejas	Ramón María Narváez
Reign of Isabella II (1833–1868)	23 April 1868	15 June 1868	Carlos Marfori y Callejas	Luis González Bravo
Reign of Isabella II (1833–1868)	15 June 1868	19 September 1868	Tomás Rodríguez Rubí	Luis González Bravo
Junta Revolucionaria Interina (1868–1871)
Junta Revolucionaria Interina (1868–1871)	8 October 1868	18 June 1869	Adelardo López de Ayala	Pascual Madoz Ibáñez; Joaquín Aguirre de la Peña; Francisco Serrano
Junta Revolucionaria Interina (1868–1871)	18 June 1869	6 August 1869	Juan Bautista Topete	Juan Prim
Junta Revolucionaria Interina (1868–1871)	6 August 1869	2 April 1870	Manuel Becerra y Bermúdez	Juan Prim
Junta Revolucionaria Interina (1868–1871)	2 April 1870	27 December 1870	Segismundo Moret y Prendergast	Juan Prim
Junta Revolucionaria Interina (1868–1871)	27 December 1870	4 January 1871	Adelardo López de Ayala	Juan Bautista Topete
Reign of Amadeo I (1871–1873)
Reign of Amadeo I (1871–1873)	4 January 1871	24 July 1871	Adelardo López de Ayala	Francisco Serrano
Reign of Amadeo I (1871–1873)	24 July 1871	5 October 1871	Tomás Mosquera	Manuel Ruiz Zorrilla
Reign of Amadeo I (1871–1873)	5 October 1871	21 December 1871	Víctor Balaguer	José Malcampo
Reign of Amadeo I (1871–1873)	21 December 1871	20 January 1872	Juan Bautista Topete	Práxedes Mateo Sagasta
Reign of Amadeo I (1871–1873)	20 January 1872	26 May 1872	Cristóbal Martín de Herrera	Práxedes Mateo Sagasta
Reign of Amadeo I (1871–1873)	26 May 1872	13 June 1872	Adelardo López de Ayala	Francisco Serrano
Reign of Amadeo I (1871–1873)	13 June 1872	21 December 1872	Eduardo Gasset y Artime	Manuel Ruiz Zorrilla
Reign of Amadeo I (1871–1873)	21 December 1872	12 February 1873	Tomás Mosquera	Manuel Ruiz Zorrilla
First Spanish Republic (1873–1874)
First Spanish Republic (1873–1874)	12 February 1873	24 February 1873	Nicolás Salmerón	Estanislao Figueras
First Spanish Republic (1873–1874)	24 February 1873	11 June 1873	José Cristóbal Sorní y Grau	Estanislao Figueras
First Spanish Republic (1873–1874)	11 June 1873	13 June 1873	José Cristóbal Sorní y Grau	Francisco Pi i Margall
First Spanish Republic (1873–1874)	13 June 1873	19 July 1873	Francisco Suñer	Francisco Pi i Margall
First Spanish Republic (1873–1874)	19 July 1873	4 September 1873	Eduardo Palanca Asensi	Nicolás Salmerón
First Spanish Republic (1873–1874)	4 September 1873	3 January 1874	Santiago Soler y Pla	Emilio Castelar
First Spanish Republic (1873–1874)	3 January 1874	13 May 1874	Tomás Mosquera	Francisco Serrano; Juan Zavala de la Puente
First Spanish Republic (1873–1874)	13 May 1874	3 September 1874	Antonio Romero Ortiz	Juan Zavala de la Puente
First Spanish Republic (1873–1874)	3 September 1874	31 December 1874	Antonio Romero Ortiz	Práxedes Mateo Sagasta
Reign of Alfonso XII (1874–1885)	31 December 1874	12 September 1875	Adelardo López de Ayala	Antonio Cánovas del Castillo
Reign of Alfonso XII (1874–1885)	12 September 1875	2 December 1875	Adelardo López de Ayala	Joaquín Jovellar
Reign of Alfonso XII (1874–1885)	2 December 1875	15 January 1877	Adelardo López de Ayala	Antonio Cánovas del Castillo
Reign of Alfonso XII (1874–1885)	15 January 1877	8 March 1879	Cristóbal Martín de Herrera	Antonio Cánovas del Castillo
Reign of Alfonso XII (1874–1885)	8 March 1879	9 December 1879	Salvador Albacete	Arsenio Martínez-Campos
Reign of Alfonso XII (1874–1885)	9 December 1879	23 March 1880	José Elduayen Gorriti	Antonio Cánovas del Castillo
Reign of Alfonso XII (1874–1885)	23 March 1880	8 February 1881	Cayetano Sánchez Bustillo	Antonio Cánovas del Castillo
Reign of Alfonso XII (1874–1885)	8 February 1881	9 October 1883	Fernando León y Castillo	Práxedes Mateo Sagasta
Reign of Alfonso XII (1874–1885)	9 October 1883	13 October 1883	Gaspar Núñez de Arce	Práxedes Mateo Sagasta
Reign of Alfonso XII (1874–1885)	13 October 1883	18 January 1884	Estanislao Suárez Inclán	José Posada Herrera
Reign of Alfonso XII (1874–1885)	18 January 1884	27 November 1885	Manuel Aguirre de Tejada	Antonio Cánovas del Castillo
Regency of Maria Christina of Austria (1885–1902)	27 November 1885	10 October 1886	Germán Gamazo Calvo	Práxedes Mateo Sagasta
Regency of Maria Christina of Austria (1885–1902)	12 November 1887	14 June 1888	Víctor Balaguer	Práxedes Mateo Sagasta
Regency of Maria Christina of Austria (1885–1902)	14 June 1888	11 December 1888	Trinitario Ruiz Capdepón	Práxedes Mateo Sagasta
Regency of Maria Christina of Austria (1885–1902)	11 December 1888	21 January 1890	Manuel Becerra y Bermúdez	Práxedes Mateo Sagasta
Regency of Maria Christina of Austria (1885–1902)	21 January 1890	5 July 1890	Manuel Becerra y Bermúdez	Práxedes Mateo Sagasta
Regency of Maria Christina of Austria (1885–1902)	5 July 1890	23 November 1891	Antonio María Fabié	Antonio Cánovas del Castillo
Regency of Maria Christina of Austria (1885–1902)	23 November 1891	11 December 1892	Francisco Romero Robledo	Antonio Cánovas del Castillo
Regency of Maria Christina of Austria (1885–1902)	11 December 1892	12 March 1894	Antonio Maura Montaner	Práxedes Mateo Sagasta
Regency of Maria Christina of Austria (1885–1902)	12 March 1894	4 November 1894	Manuel Becerra y Bermúdez	Práxedes Mateo Sagasta
Regency of Maria Christina of Austria (1885–1902)	4 November 1894	23 March 1895	Buenaventura Abarzuza Ferrer	Práxedes Mateo Sagasta
Regency of Maria Christina of Austria (1885–1902)	23 March 1895	8 August 1897	Tomás Castellano y Villarroya	Antonio Cánovas del Castillo
Regency of Maria Christina of Austria (1885–1902)	8 August 1897	4 October 1897	Tomás Castellano y Villarroya	Marcelo Azcárraga
Regency of Maria Christina of Austria (1885–1902)	4 October 1897	18 May 1898	Segismundo Moret y Prendergast	Práxedes Mateo Sagasta
Regency of Maria Christina of Austria (1885–1902)	18 May 1898	7 March 1899	Vicente Romero Girón	Práxedes Mateo Sagasta
Regency of Maria Christina of Austria (1885–1902)	7 March 1899	20 April 1899	Raimundo Fernández Villaverde	Francisco Silvela
