= Carlos Marfori, 1st Marquess of Loja =

Spanish-Italian politician

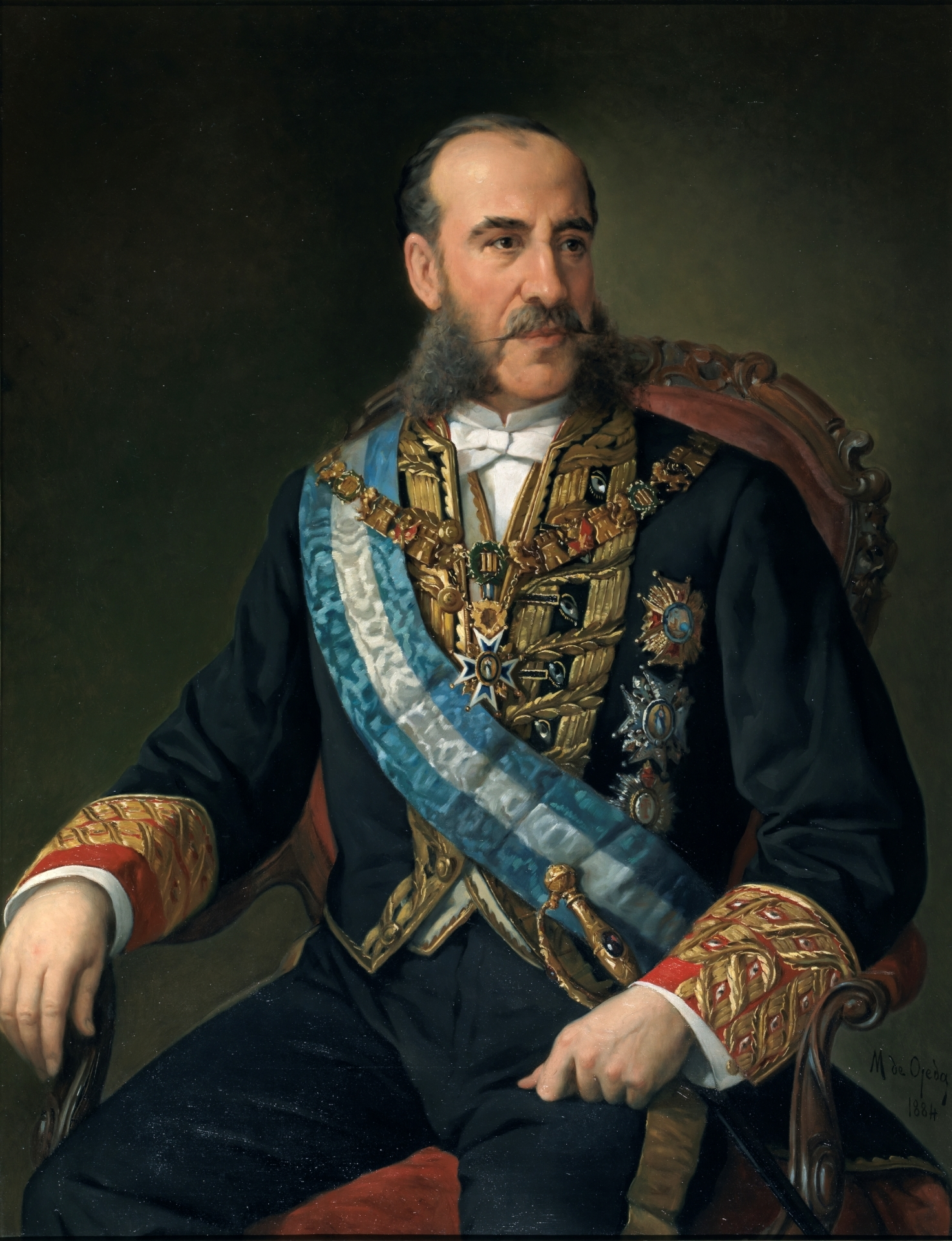
Portrait by Manuel Ojeda, 1884

Carlos Marfori y Callejas, 1st Marquess of Loja (born on 10 November 1821, died 2 June 1892), was a Spanish-Italian politician who served as Overseas Minister from 1867 to 1868.

== Life and career ==
Born in San Fernando, Cádiz, son of Francisco-Antonio Marfori y Rodi, an Italian nobleman, and María-Josefa Callejas y Pavón. He was married to María de la Concepción Fernández de Córdoba y Campos, a Prime Minister Narváez's cousin. He died in 1892 in Madrid.

Marfori was claimed to be the lover as well as the favorite of queen Isabella II, and aroused a great deal of discontent because of his inability to be show discretion about his relationship with the queen and how it benefitted his career.

1. Mayor and Civil Governor of Madrid (1857)
2. Member of Spanish Parliament for Loja and Granada (1857–1884)
3. Overseas Minister (1867–1868)
4. Provisional Army Minister and lifelong Senator from 1891.
