= Emilio Terrero y Perinat =

Emilio Terrero
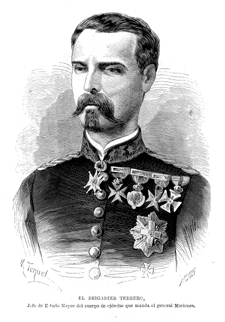

106th Governor-General of the Philippines
- In office April 4, 1885 – 1888
- Preceded by: Emilio de Molíns
- Succeeded by: Antonio Molto

Personal details
- Born: 1827
- Died: 1890 (aged 62–63)
- Profession: Governor General

Military service
- Allegiance: Kingdom of Spain
- Rank

Emilio Terrero y Perinat (1827–1890) was a 33rd degree Mason who became the Governor-General of the Philippines from 1885 to 1888. He was renowned for his campaign against the Moros in Mindanao.

== Governor General of the Philippines ==
Terrero was lieutenant general before he became Governor General of the Philippines on April 4, 1885 due to his appointment to the post by Praxedes Mateo Sagasta, then Prime Minister of Spain. Terrero started out as a new Carlist, but after seeing first hand the abuses and avarice of the friars and their blatant disregard of the laws of the land, he gradually abandoned his absolutist and apostolic Carlist convictions and was transformed into a liberal, reform-minded and anti-clerical Governor General. He took part in the Carolinas dispute between Spain and Germany in 1885, in which the friars funded construction of a ship named Crucera Filipina in 1886. The dispute raised alarm in Manila that a German invasion of the Philippines was imminent, with the Carolinas taken by Germany without resistance. Terrero himself awarded the two leaders he sent to facilitate Carolinas who escaped. The erection of a monument in honor of King Carlos IV, the man who made smallpox vaccine possible in the Philippines, was initiated in 1824, and finally accomplished during Terrero's term. In the middle of 1887, few electric lights were established along the quays from the mouth of Pasig River to the first bridge, and one light also on that bridge, so that steamers could enter the river after sunset if desired. A concession for the construction of a railway line from Manila to Dagupan was granted to Don Edmundo Sykes of the Ferrocarril de Manila-Dagupan on June 1, 1887. The Ferrocarril de Manila-Dagupan which constitutes much of the North Main Line today, began construction in July 1887 with the laying of the cornerstone for Tutuban station by Terrero himself.

=== Connections with Rizal ===
Jose Rizal's Noli Me Tangere was not absolutely banned in the archipelago, as suggested by the Censorship Commission, due to Terrero's efforts. His term ended in 1888 and was not renewed. Terrero was even mentioned in the said novel as un generalito Calamidad for his campaign against the Moros.

=== Expedition against the Moros ===
He began an expedition against the Moros under Datu Uto in Mindanao in 1885, and led an all-out war in pursuit of the Moro leader by 1887. The Moros became insurgent when a famine struck Mindanao in 1872, and their Christianization proved troublesome for his administration. He was able to destroy a number of forts in Cotabato and gain for the Spanish flag Sarangani Bay by June 1886. On March 10, 1888, Datu Uto signed a peace treaty with the Spaniards.

Preceded by Emilio de Molíns	Spanish Governor - Captain General of the Philippines; 1885–1888	Succeeded by Antonio Molto
