= Cristóbal Martín de Herrera =

Spanish politician

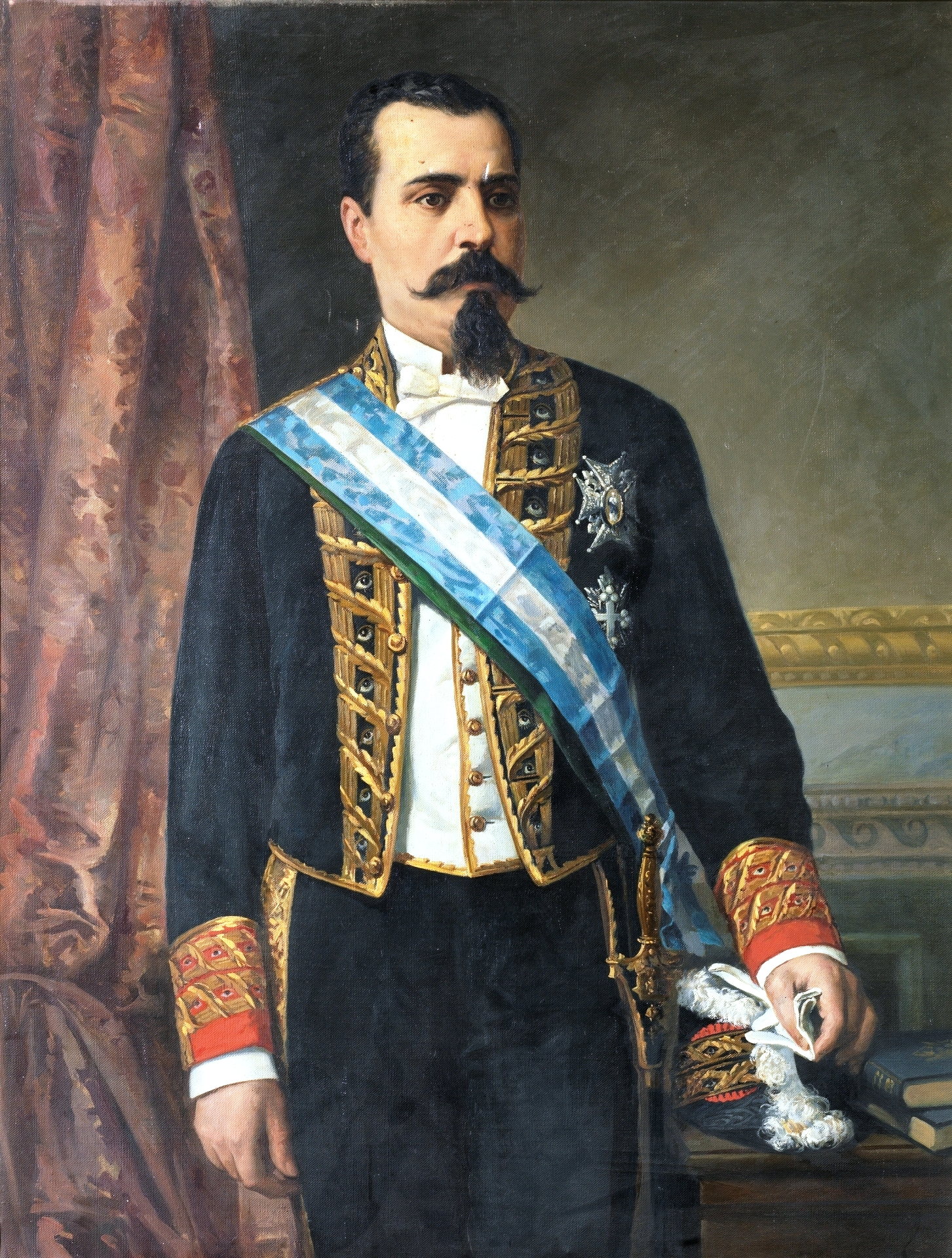
A picture of Cristóbal Martín de Herrera

Cristóbal Martín de Herrera (29 March 1831 in Aldeadávila de la Ribera, Spain – 1878 in Madrid, Spain) was a Spanish politician who served as Minister of Public Works in the reign of Alfonso XII.
