= Cuatro de Marzo =

Neighborhood in Valladolid, Spain

Cuatro de Marzo is a neighborhood in the city of Valladolid, Spain, located between Paseo de Zorrilla and the Pisuerga River and inaugurated on October 29, 1959, by the then Head of the Spanish State, Francisco Franco.

== Characteristics ==
The residential complex of 1,947 apartments, whose construction began in 1954, was planned to alleviate the housing shortage during the Spanish postwar period. It is configured with linear blocks of different heights in red brick, closed at its ends with five 11-story towers. The apartments come in two types, 80 and 120 square meters. Likewise, the neighborhood is divided in two by a green area in front of the facade of the Church of Santo Domingo de Guzmán, of modern style. It also has a school group and up to 23 commercial premises.

== Name ==
The name of the neighborhood refers to the event that took place on March 4, 1934, in the Calderón Theater, when the Juntas de Ofensiva Nacional-Sindicalista (JONS) of Onésimo Redondo and Ramiro Ledesma merged with the Falange Española of José Antonio Primo de Rivera resulting in Falange Española de las JONS. In the center of the neighborhood, there is a monolith in honor of Jesús Aramburu, civil governor of Valladolid and promoter of the urban work.

== Gallery ==
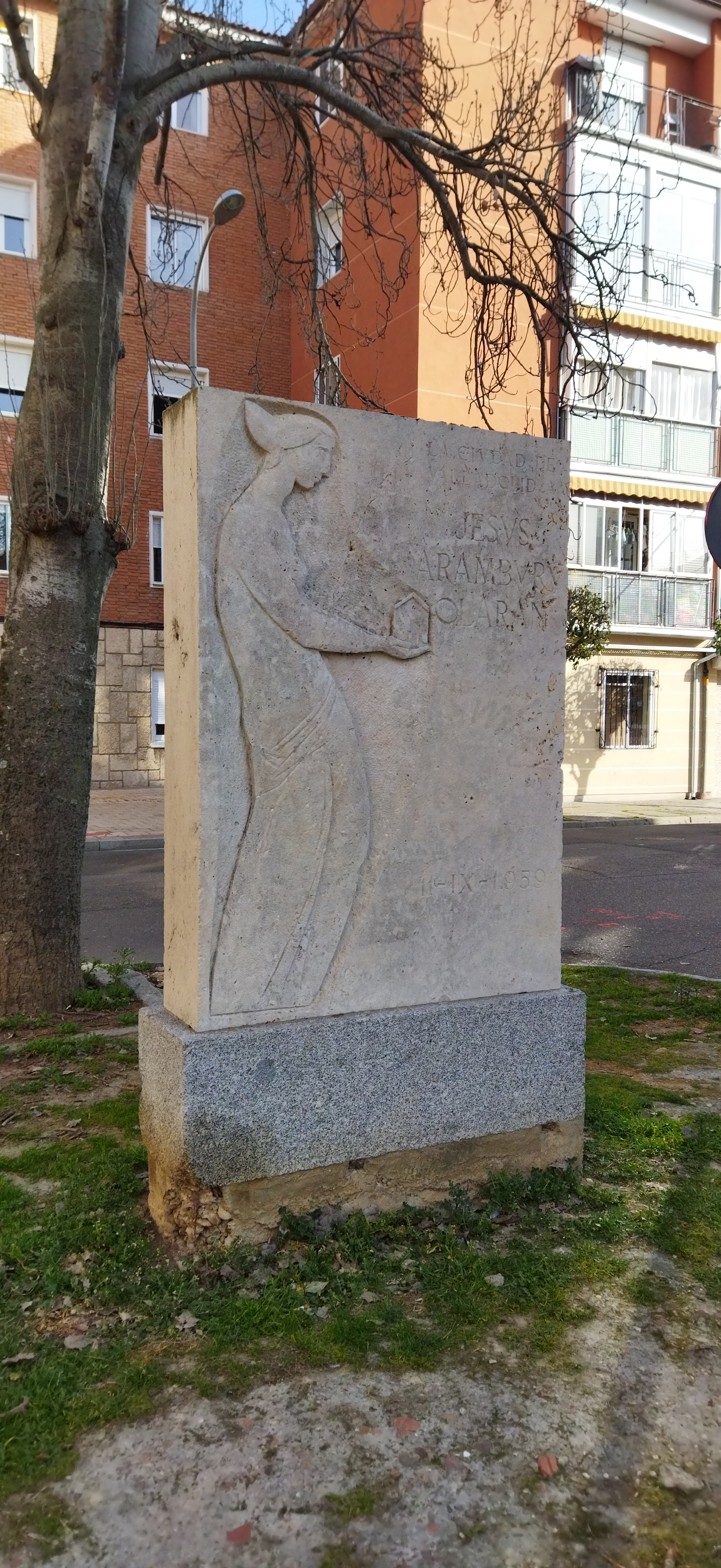
Monolith in honor of Jesús Aramburu

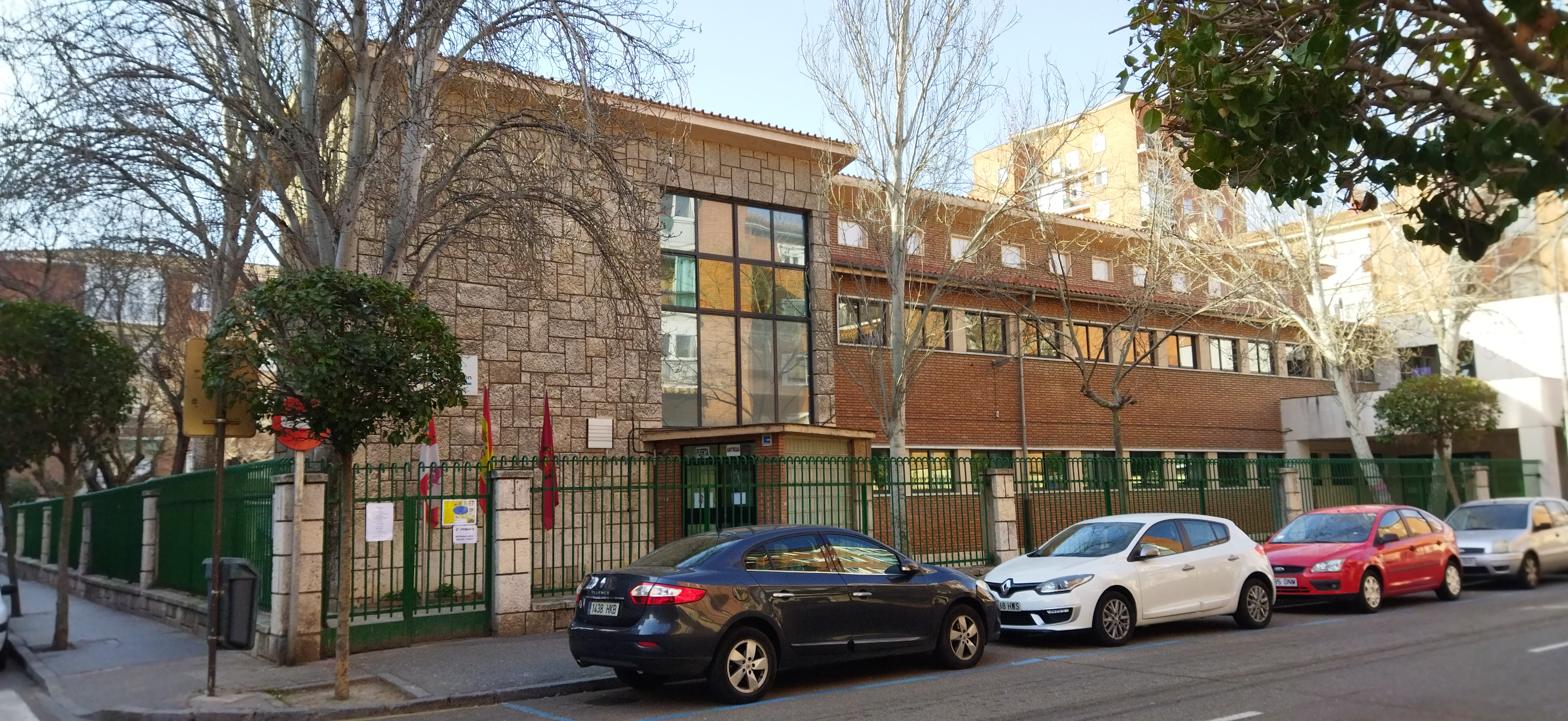
Francisco de Quevedo School Group

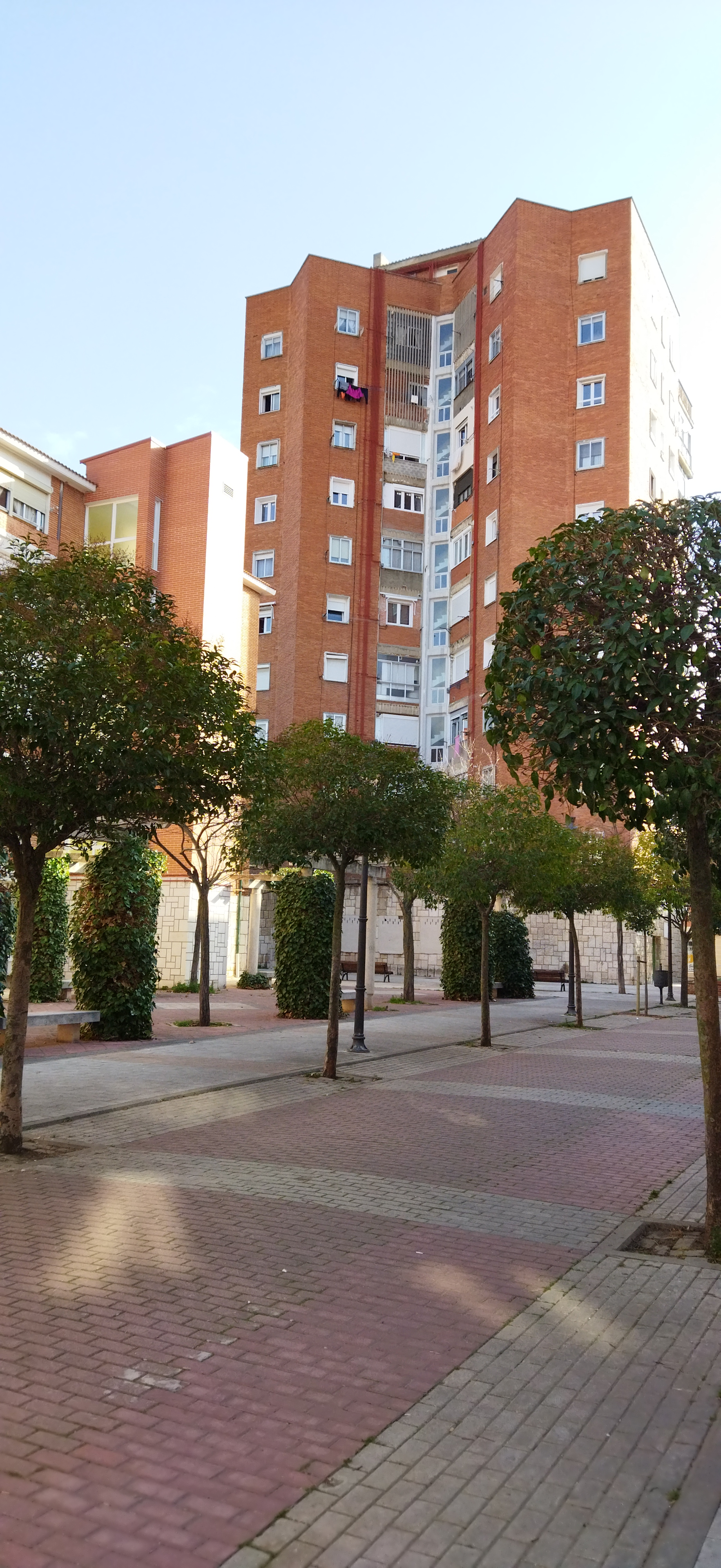
One of the towers that close the neighborhood

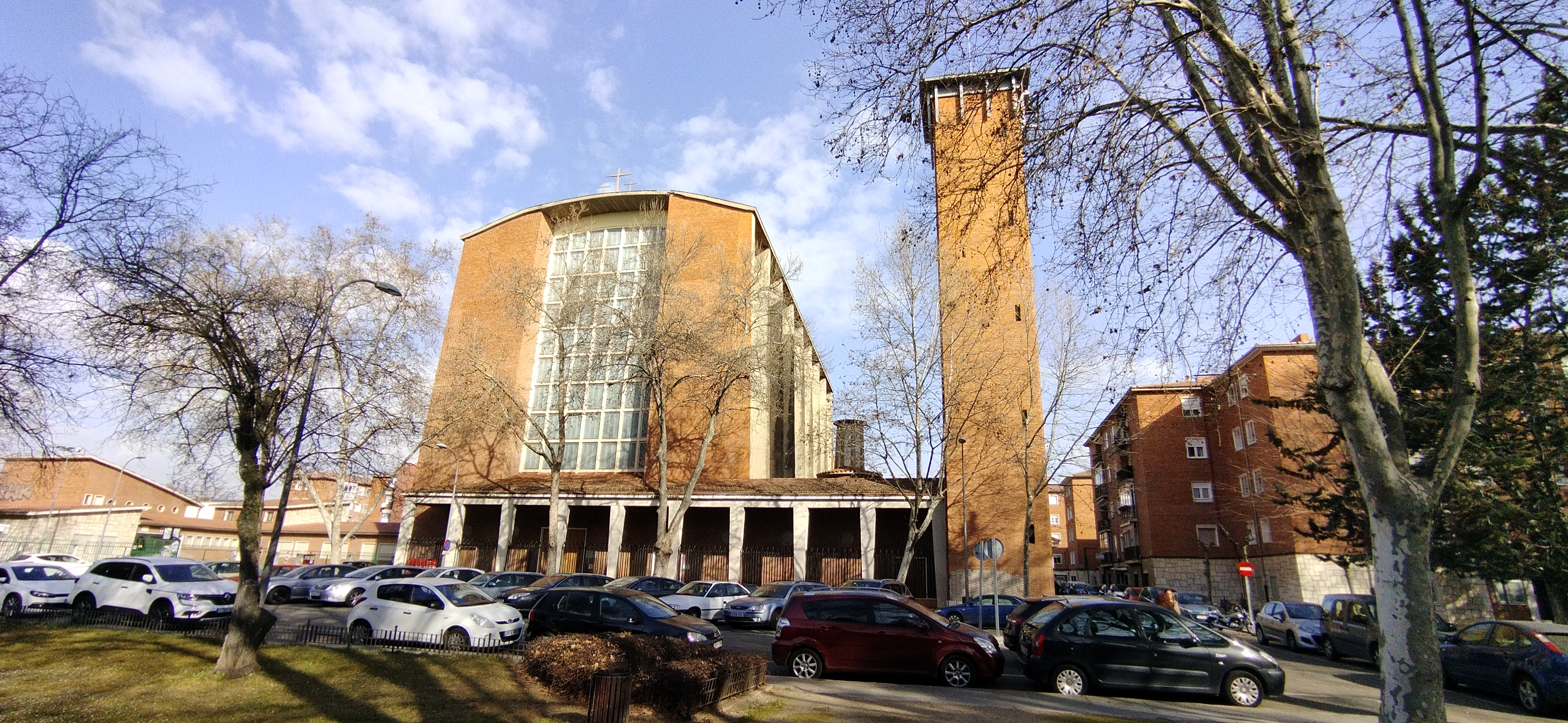
Church of Santo Domingo de Guzmán
