= Yoke and arrows =

Badge of Spanish monarchy, fascist emblem

The yoke and arrows

The yoke and arrows (Spanish: Yugo y flechas) or the yoke and the bundle of arrows (Spanish: Yugo y haz de flechas) is a symbolic badge dating back to the dynastic union of Spain's Catholic monarchs Ferdinand II of Aragon and Isabella I of Castile. Subsequent Catholic monarchs continued to use it on their shields to represent a united Spain and symbolize "the heroic virtues of the race".

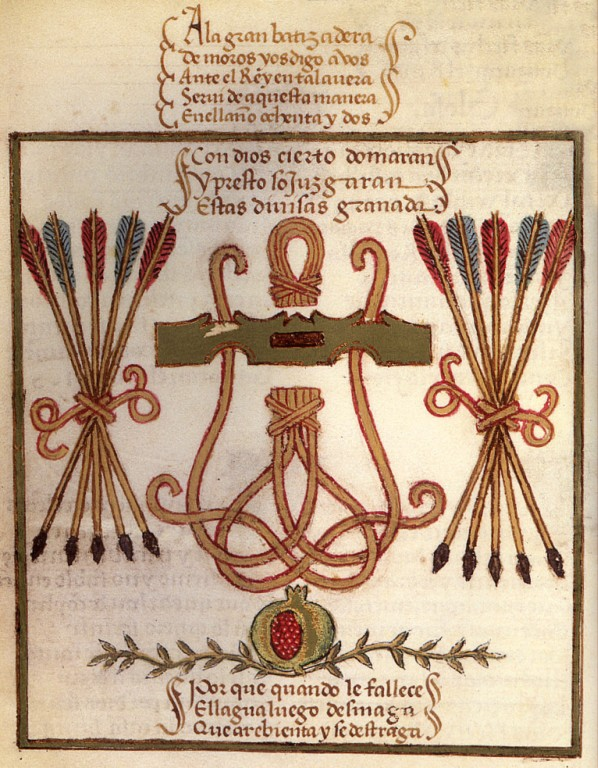
Badge of Ferdinand II and Isabella

It was also an allusion to the names of the founding monarchs: Y stood for yugo and for Ysabel (in contemporary spelling) and F stood for flechas and for Ferdinand. The yoke referred to the legend of the Gordian knot, as did Isabel and Ferdinand's motto Tanto monta; the bundle of arrows alluded to the ancient proverb that arrows can be easily broken one by one, but are unbreakable if tied together.

== Spanish Empire ==
Royal Standard of Spain, 1492–1508

Many possessions of the Spanish Empire incorporated the yoke and arrows into their coats of arms. Although these countries and territories are no longer part of Spain, some of them retain this symbol in their heraldry, e.g., the coat of arms of Puerto Rico and Panama City. Additionally, minted coins included the symbol since at least Joanna of Castile's reign.

== Recent history ==
On 24 January 1927, far-right writer Rafael Sánchez Mazas noted the poetic importance of the symbol, which connected the Catholic monarchs and the envisioned Spanish future, at a conference in Santander.

One account of its official induction into the national syndicalist movement credits Juan Aparicio López, who suggested it for the Juntas de Ofensiva Nacional-Sindicalista (JONS) during its founding in 1931; while a student at the Faculty of Law of Granada, he was purportedly told by socialist professor Fernando de los Ríos that if fascism were to arise in Spain, the yoke and arrows would serve as its symbol, as opposed to the fasces. According to Ramiro Ledesma, the yoke and arrows symbol was unanimously accepted upon the 1934 merging of JONS and Falange Española into Falange Española de las JONS. That year, José Antonio Primo de Rivera is quoted as attributing further meaning to the symbol: "the yoke of labor and the arrows of power". As for its historical importance, he explained the yoke represented King Ferdinand's subjugation of his enemies and the arrows, Queen Isabella's expulsion of Muslims. This iteration was popularly referred to as a spider (araña) or crab.

During the Spanish Civil War, the symbol was used as one of the major emblems of the Nationalist faction. Following their victory in 1937, Falange became the sole legal party, being reorganized into the FET y de las JONS, and their yoke and arrows a main symbol of the Francoist regime, even being conferred as the Imperial Order of the Yoke and Arrows. It was eventually removed during the Spanish transition to democracy, together with the also appropriated Eagle of Saint John.

Flag of the Spanish Falange

Logo of the Spanish Falange

Francoist Spain coat of arms (1939–1945)

Francoist Spain coat of arms (1945–1977)

Following the death of Franco and transition to democracy, it is no longer representative of Spain or its monarchy and is mostly considered a symbol of the Fascist far-right, though it continued to be present in the personal coat of arms of King Juan Carlos I. In October 2007, the Spanish Cortes banned Francoist symbols, including the yoke and arrows. Opposition claimed Prime Minister José Luis Rodríguez Zapatero's administration was "opening old wounds" and "denying Spain its history". Upon his accession to the Spanish throne in 2014, King Felipe VI discontinued their use as part of his personal coat of arms.

== See also ==
- Fascist symbolism
- Mottos of Francoist Spain
