= Monument to Onésimo Redondo =

Removed monument in Valladolid, Spain

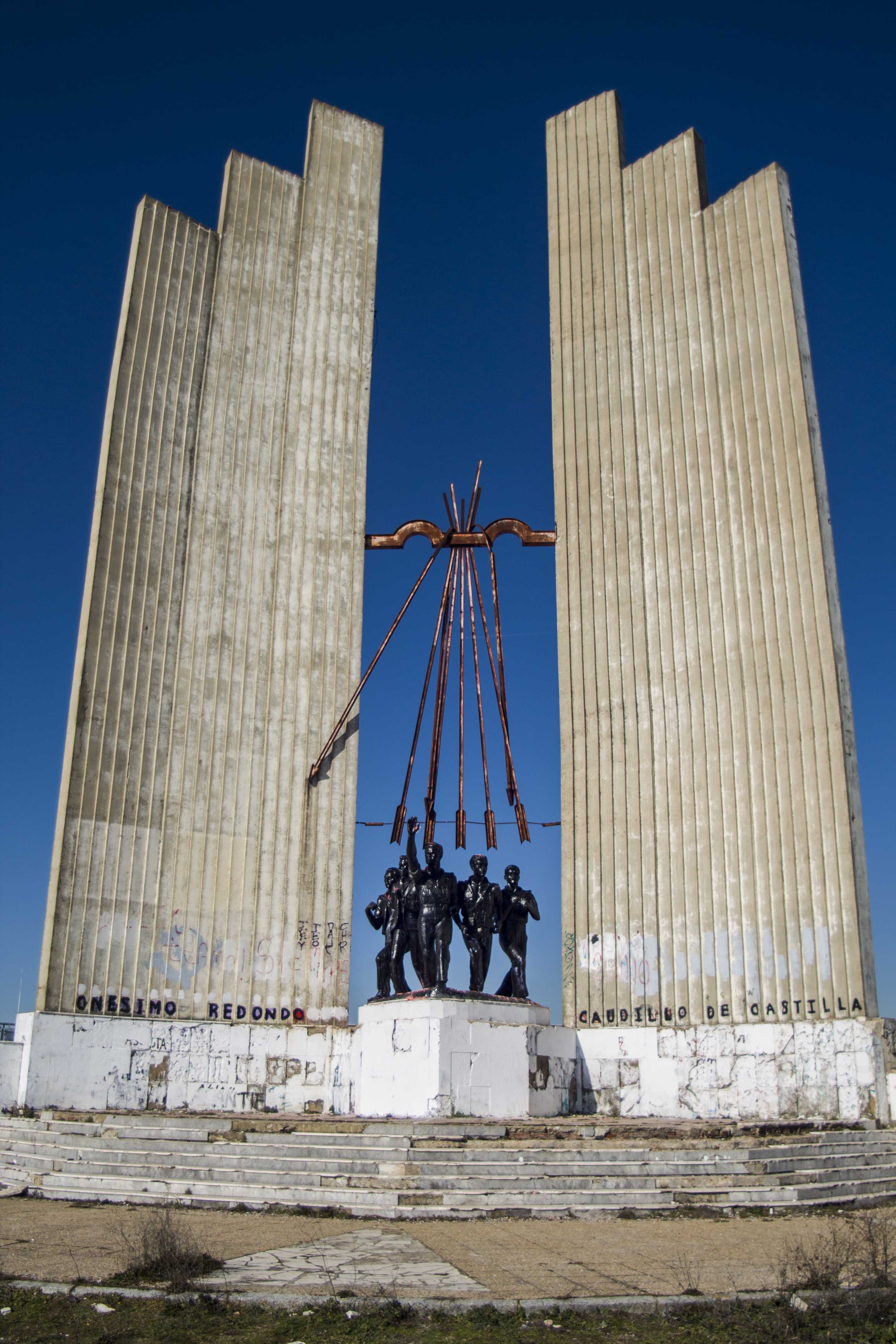
- The monument in 2015
- Interactive map of Monument to Onésimo Redondo
- Location: Cerro de San Cristóbal, Valladolid, Spain
- Coordinates: 41°36′52″N 04°41′53″W
- Designer: Jesús Vaquero (architect); Manuel Ramos (sculptor)
- Material: Bronze, concrete
- Height: 31 m
- Weight: ~5,000 kg
- Completion date: 1960
- Opening date: 24 July 1961
- Dedicated to: Onésimo Redondo
- Dismantled date: February 2016

The Monument to Onésimo Redondo (Spanish: Monumento a Onésimo Redondo) was an instance of public art in Valladolid. A memorial to Onésimo Redondo, a Fascist politician who died in the beginning of the Spanish Civil War—the so-called "Caudillo of Castile", as he came to be named by the Francoist regime—the monument was removed in February 2016 on the basis of the enforcing of the Historical Memory Law.

== History and description ==
The project was awarded to the architect Jesús Vaquero Martín and to the sculptor Manuel Ramos.

Erected on the top of the Cerro de San Cristóbal —a small hill in the outskirts of Valladolid standing at about 843 metres above sea level— the monument was practically finished by October 1960. It was unveiled on 24 July 1961, the day marking the 25th anniversary of Redondo's death during a skirmish at the beginning of the Spanish Civil War, during a ceremony presided by Francisco Franco, also attended by José Solís Ruiz, Gabriel Arias-Salgado, Cirilo Cánovas García, José Antonio Girón de Velasco and Raimundo Fernández Cuesta, among others.

The bronze sculptural group presiding the ensemble and placed below a colossal 12-metre high yoke and arrows consisted of five 3.5 metre high statues: a peasant, a student, a worker, a fighter and Onésimo Redondo himself at the centre, pulling the fascist salute. The allegorical statues attempted to convey episodes of the life of Redondo, thus making a synthesis of his life.

The sculptures were put on an altar and sided by two groups of columns, standing at a maximum height of 31 metres.

Following the death of Franco, the monument was the target of vandalism and calls for its removal.

Dismantling works started on 1 February 2016.

== In popular culture ==
Shortly after the removal of the monument, a short-film titled Fachadolid—dealing with the event—was released.
