= Juntas Castellanas de Actuación Hispánica =

Spanish political party

Castilian Boards of Hispanic Action Juntas Castellanas de Actuación Hispánica
- Abbreviation: JCAH
- Leader: Onésimo Redondo
- Founded: August 9, 1931 (95 years ago)
- Dissolved: October 10, 1931 (95 years ago)
- Merged into: Juntas de Ofensiva Nacional-Sindicalista
- Headquarters: Valladolid
- Newspaper: Libertad
- Ideology: Fascism; Spanish Nationalism; Traditionalist Catholicism; Agrarianism; Antisemitism
- Political position: Far-right
- Religion: Roman Catholicism

Juntas Castellanas de Actuación Hispánica (JCAH) (or the Castilian Boards of Hispanic Action) was a fascist Spanish political party founded in Valladolid on August 9, 1931 by Onésimo Redondo. It had a small membership that did not extend beyond the Province of Valladolid and a short existence. In October 10, 1931, it merged with the newly formed Juntas de Ofensiva Nacional-Sindicalista (JONS), created in conjunction with the group organized in Madrid by Ramiro Ledesma Ramos, which expressed its views through the magazine La Conquista del Estado (The Conquest of the State). It was the first fascist Spanish political party. The group's official organ was the weekly newspaper Libertad.

== Background ==
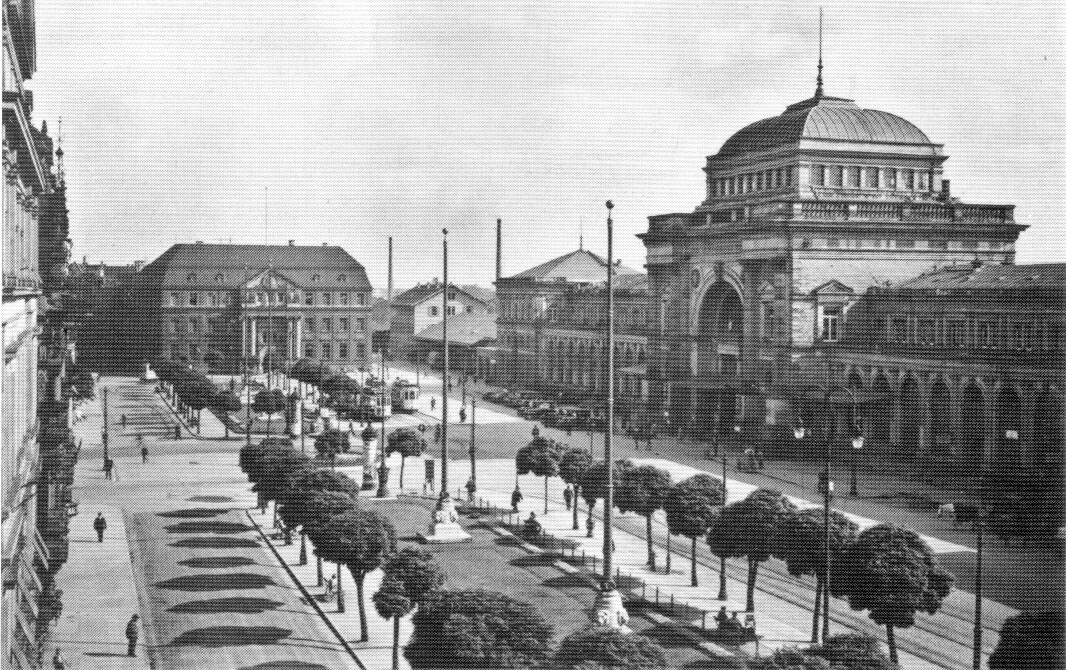
University of Mannheim, the university where Onésimo Redondo studied jurisprudence, taught Spanish, and encountered National Socialism.

The party's founder and leader was Onésimo Redondo. He was a man of rural origin from a conservative, clerical Castilian background. In 1928, he worked as a Spanish lecturer at the Catholic College of Mannheim, where he came into contact with National Socialist activities and ideology, which impressed him, although without causing him to abandon his Catholicism. This led him to develop an ideology marked by three basic objectives: national unity, social justice, and the primacy of what he considered traditional Hispanic values.

During 1930 and 1931, he organized a beet growers' union in the Province of Valladolid, which allowed him to connect with the labor movement. He strongly identified with the struggle of small Castilian farmers and was hostile to Catalan and Basque separatism, leftist workers' movements, large financiers, and liberal politicians. He advocated a rebellion of Catholic peasants and merchants in inland Spain against the freer lifestyle that existed in cosmopolitan cities, supposedly to "save the nation and put an end to selfish, pornographic, and Jewish tendencies." He believed that economic activity should be controlled by autonomous unions, but organized at a national level. Although he had been a member of the Catholic Association of Propagandists in the past, at that time he was in favor of organizing a revolutionary, nationalist, and violent youth movement. Politically, he had supported the monarchist candidacy in the municipal elections of April 1931. He had later helped to set up the Valladolid branch of Acción Nacional; but the Catholic party's compliance with the new established order disappointed the young man, who desired a more radical opposition to the Republic.

On June 13, 1931, he founded the weekly newspaper Libertad in Valladolid, through which he propagated his ideas, which advocated both the destruction of the cosmopolitan bourgeoisie and the struggle for a greater role for the Church in the Second Republic. In issue number 17, he stated:

Coeducation or school pairing is a ministerial crime against decent women. It is a chapter of Jewish action against free nations. A crime against the health of the people for which the responsible traitors must pay with their lives.

He also maintained that Spain was already immersed in a civil war and that young people should prepare for the fight:

Youth must be trained in physical combat; they must systematically embrace violence. National violence is just, necessary, and convenient. Cultivating a morality of violence, of military confrontation, is one of our enduring slogans.

Redondo became aware of Ramiro Ledesma 's publication, La Conquista del Estado, which sparked an interest that was reciprocated by his colleague.

== Foundation ==
The JCAH included some students from the University of Valladolid.

On August 9, 1931, Redondo founded the Juntas Castellanas de Actuación Hispánica, an organization intended to put his ideas into practice. Its first members were some of his followers from the area around Valladolid and several radical students. Among them were his brother Andrés, Emilio Gutiérrez Palma, Narciso García Sánchez, and the brothers Jesús and Francisco Ercilla. Other members included José Antonio Girón, Carlos Sanz, Manuel González Vicén, Elías Iglesias, Fernando Bulnes, and Javier Martínez de Bedoya. The leaders attempted to recruit enough followers to form militias according to fascist principles, calling on young people to seize political power, as they were the only group he considered "uncontaminated" by liberalism and Marxism.

The organization was Catholic and anti-communist, and its motto was "Tradition and Renewal." One of its objectives was the so-called Hispanic Revolution, which was to be "led by a youth movement inflamed with the desire to make Spain great." Although ideologically different from Ledesma 's group, fascist ideology was present. However, the JCAH had a more defensive character than the group formed around La Conquista del Estado, which had a more revolutionary bent. Redondo considered the participation of youth in political activity, understood as a "civic militia," to be necessary.

== Ideology ==
The purpose of the JCAH was to establish a national dictatorship that would abolish parliament, promote anti-Semitic activities, and eliminate opposition groups. The party did not call itself fascist, as it considered its project of a "Hispanic revolution" to be entirely original, although it recognized that fascism pursued similar objectives.

The party devoted much time to theorizing about the legitimacy of using violence. It considered it the State's obligation to curb existing threats to national unity. But, given the government's inability to stop revolutionary violence, citizens were authorized to use it through national militias.

=== Agrarianism ===
To win the support of conservative small landowners, Redondo espoused a regenerationist ruralism inspired by Joaquín Costa and Macías Picavea. Libertad promulgated the slogan "¡Castilla, salva a España!" (Castile, save Spain!) as the motto of the "new revolution." The idealized Castile of the Juntas was that of conservative small landowners, a rural society in which traditionalist Catholicism persisted. It included small towns, but not the capital. Redondo opposed agrarian reform and, in particular, the distribution of land to landless peasants. In contrast, he proposed a new agricultural orientation for economic policy, intervention to maintain stable grain prices, the creation of a single agricultural bank, the expansion of irrigation systems, and the reconstitution of some communal lands eliminated by disentailment.

=== Antisemitism ===
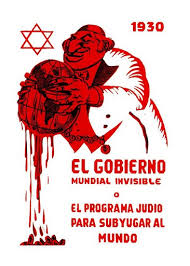
Anti-semitic literature influenced Redondo and the JCAH.

Although a residual anti-Judaism rooted in religion persisted in Spain for centuries, antisemitism was not a fundamental component of the Spanish far right. However, in the 1930s, political radicalization and Nazi influence led to the association of "Jewishness" with Freemasonry and Marxism as supposed " internal enemies." By then, the antisemitic libel known as The Protocols of the Elders of Zion had already spread throughout Europe. Its arguments were repeated by Henry Ford in his book The International Jew, which was published several times in Spain. Based on this latter work, Redondo published two articles in Libertad: "The Jewish Danger," on June 27, 1931, and "The International Jew: Intervention of American Jews in the Russian Revolution," on September 28. In these articles, he made derogatory references to Judaism and added insults directed at Republican and Socialist politicians. Other leaders of the Juntas made comments about Marx's supposed Jewish spirit.

In another article published on July 24 and entitled "The next burning of convents", Redondo proposed explicit measures to eliminate his enemies:

That is why we propose that, in the defense, the shots be aimed at the heads of the truly responsible parties, those types who found these publications with Jewish money, and who knows, perhaps even money from the Spanish State itself! Among them is the famous old woman we have as Minister of Fine Arts. (Note: The allusion was to the Minister of Public Instruction and Fine Arts, Domingo, and it earned Redondo a lawsuit for slander.)

Redondo's writings, however, lacked the ability to clearly identify the adversary, which hampered his proselytizing efforts.

== Merger with JONS ==
The small JCAH groups were completely isolated in Valladolid and lacked contacts in Madrid. Despite their efforts, the group never exceeded thirty or forty members, including professionals, farmers, and university students like José Antonio Girón de Velasco. Since Ledesma had run out of financial resources, the two groups made contact in September 1931 because they felt they needed each other. Despite their differences, both the Catholic Redondo and the subversive Ledesma were nationalists, revolutionaries, anti-Marxists, and authoritarians. The union of both groups was necessary for their survival. Consequently, on October 10, La Conquista del Estado announced the merger of both groups to form the new Juntas de Ofensiva Nacional Sindicalista (JONS) (also the National Syndicalist Offensive Committees). Thus was born the first political organization with an explicitly national-syndicalist ideology.

== See also ==
- National Syndicalism
- Juntas de Ofensiva Nacional Sindicalista
- Onésimo Redondo

== Bibliography ==
- Gallego, Ferrán (2005). Fascism in Spain: Essays on the Social and Cultural Origins of Francoism. El Viejo Topo. ISBN 84-96356-32-9.
- González Calleja, Eduardo (1994). "Straitjackets: Fascism and Paramilitarization" (PDF). Archived from the original on 2016-09-21.
- Counterrevolutionaries. Madrid: Alianza Editorial. 2011. pp. 148–149. ISBN 978-84-206-6455-2.
- Martín Jiménez, Ignacio (2000). The Civil War in Valladolid, 1936-1939. Bloody Dawns. Ámbito.
- Payne, Stanley G. (1985). Phalanx. History of Spanish fascism. Madrid: Sarpe. ISBN 84-7291-764-9.
- Rodríguez Jiménez, José Luis (2000). History of the Falange Española de las JONS. Madrid: Editorial Alliance. ISBN 84-206-6750-1.
