= No-Do =

Spanish state-controlled newsreel (1943–1981)

No-Do is the colloquial name for Noticiario y Documentales ("News and Documentaries"), a state-controlled series of cinema newsreels produced in Spain from 1943 to 1981 and closely associated with the dictatorial regime of Francisco Franco.

In their heyday, the No-Do newsreels contained Francoist propaganda and effervescent reporting in favour of the Francoist State. They were a way in which Franco could have a monopoly over the news and supply public information, censorship and propaganda for the formation of public opinion favorable to the Spanish State.

After Franco's death, the No-Do newsreels, tainted by their indelible association with the Francoist State, fell out of favour within a few years of the Spanish transition to democracy. The last No-Do was produced in 1981 prior to the operation's absorption into RTVE, Spain's state-controlled television and radio broadcaster. The No-Do archive is an important asset of RTVE and is often mined for nostalgia programmes.

In December 2012, the interactive media of RTVE digitized and launched the complete No-Do library on the RTVE website, being able to be accessed for the first time by users around the world and not only by researchers. There are only five lost newsreels.

== See also ==
- Propaganda in Spain
