= Libertad (newspaper) =

Spanish defunct newspaper

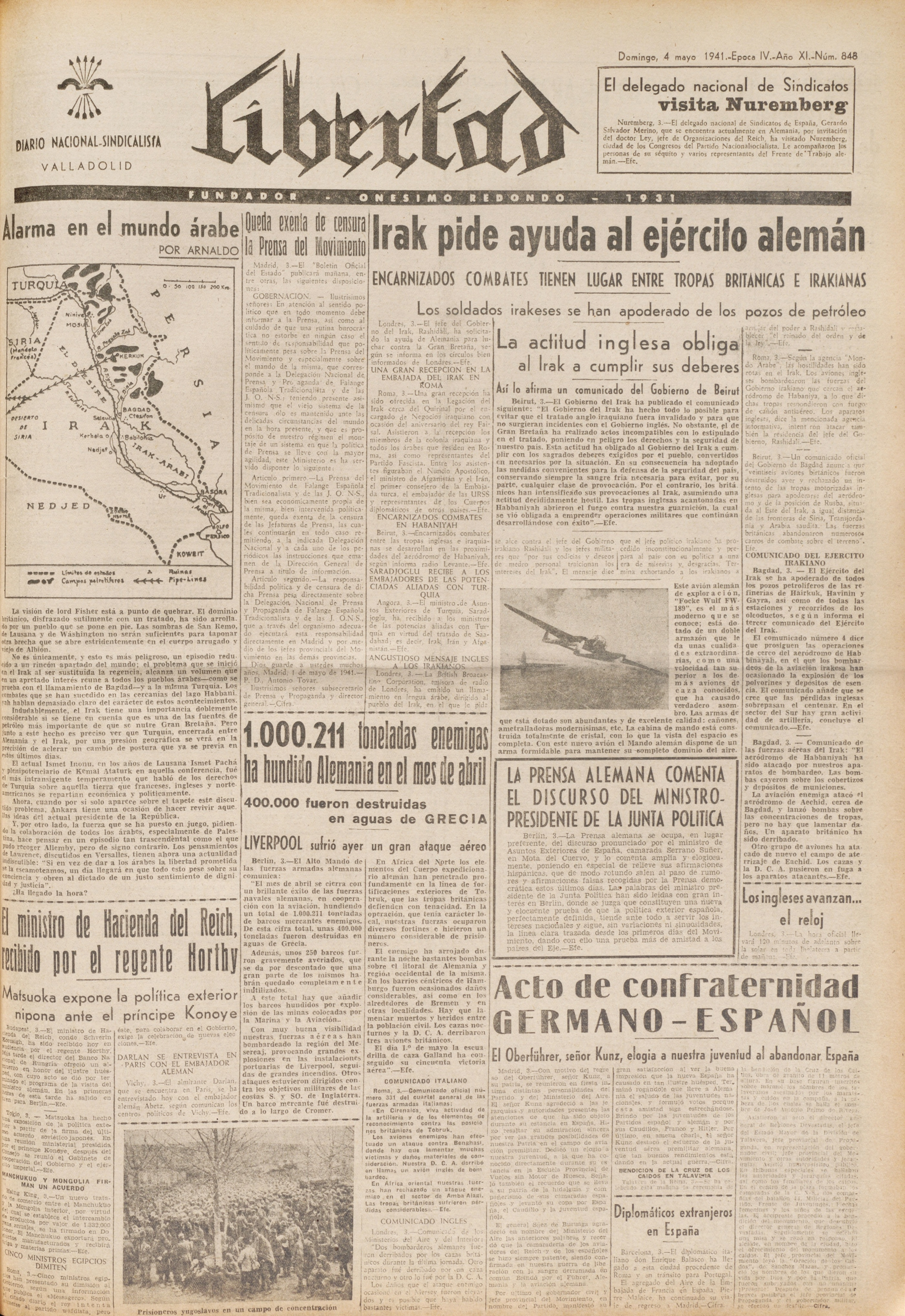
- Image of 1941 page of Libertad
- Type: Newspaper
- Owner: Cadena de Prensa del Movimiento (1938–79)
- Founder: Onésimo Redondo
- Founded: 13 June 1931
- Ceased publication: June 1979
- Political alignment: Juntas de Ofensiva Nacional-Sindicalista; Fascism; Antisemitism
- Language: Spanish
- Headquarters: Valladolid, Spain
- Circulation: Daily; Weekly (1936–1938)

Libertad was a Spanish newspaper published in Valladolid between 1931 and 1979. Originally founded by the fascist leader Onésimo Redondo as a weekly of fascist, pro-Nazi and antisemitic ideology, during the Civil War it became a daily newspaper. It continued to be published until its disappearance in 1979, after the end of the Franco regime.

== History ==
=== Early years ===
The newspaper was originally founded by the fascist leader Onésimo Redondo as the weekly Libertad, on 13 June 1931. A group of authors who used to publish there, such as Javier Martínez de Bedoya, Carlos Fernández-Cuenca, Jesús Ercilla and Emilio Gutiérrez Palma, gathered around Redondo.

During the republican period it was the main fascist publication in Valladolid, which caused it a few problems with the authorities: suspensions, fines and legal proceedings. In one of these suspensions, the publication had to be temporarily replaced – between 1932 and 1933 – by the weekly Igualdad, before circulating again. From Libertad, a strong follow-up of German Nazism was made, reaching the point of reproducing the writings of Adolf Hitler. Antisemitic diatribes appeared in its pages and the antisemitic libel The Protocols of the Elders of Zion was even published in instalments. During these years it also served as the organ of the party founded by Redondo, the Juntas Castellanas de Actuación Hispánica (JCAH), and later it would also be the organ of its successor, the Juntas de Ofensiva Nacional-Sindicalista (JONS). After the union of the JONS with the Spanish Falange, the magazine continued to be published with some interruptions until 20 May 1935, when it ceased to be published on the orders of the Falangist leader José Antonio Primo de Rivera – who with this measure would have sought to promote the dissemination of the weekly Arriba of Madrid.

=== Francoist Spain ===
After the start of the Civil War in the summer of 1936, Libertad re-emerged as a weekly. Under the new direction of Gabriel Arias-Salgado, as of 21 August 1938, the old weekly began to be published daily. Subsequently, the newspaper became the property of FET and the JONS, and during the Franco dictatorship it became part of the so-called Movement Press as its official organ in Valladolid.

During the years of Francoism, Narciso García Sánchez, Víctor Gómez Ayllón, Timoteo Esteban Vega, passed by the direction of the newspaper. In this period it was one of the three newspapers that were published in the capital of Valladolid, along with Diario Regional and El Norte de Castilla. However, unlike the others, Libertad never had very high sales among the population. In 1966, the newspaper was deficient for the public coffers. After Franco's death, it was incorporated into the state entity Media de Comunicación Social del Estado (MCSE), but the situation continued to worsen. By 1979, it had accumulated losses of almost forty-six million pesetas, and its daily print run was only 885 copies. This situation made its maintenance unsustainable and its closure was finally agreed in 1979.

== Bibliography ==
- Bardavío, Joaquín; Sinova, Justino (2000). Todo Franco. Franquismo y antifranquismo de la A a la Z (in Spanish). Plaza & Janés.
- Checa Godoy, Antonio (1989). Prensa y partidos políticos durante la II República (in Spanish). Universidad de Salamanca. ISBN 84-7481-521-5.
- De las Heras Pedrosa, Carlos (2000). La prensa del movimiento y su gestión publicitaria, 1936-1984 (in Spanish). Universidad de Málaga. doi:10.5281/zenodo.2603453. ISBN 84-7496-771-6.
- Domínguez Arribas, Javier (2009). El enemigo judeo-masónico en la propaganda franquista, 1936-1945 (in Spanish). Marcial Pons Historia. ISBN 978-84-96467-98-9.
- Gallego, Ferran; Morente Valero, Francisco (2005). Fascismo en España: ensayos sobre los orígenes sociales y culturales del franquismo (in Spanish). Editorial El Viejo Topo. ISBN 9788496356320.
- Gallego, Ferran (2014). El evangelio fascista: la formación de la cultura política del franquismo (1930-1950) (in Spanish). Crítica.
- García Venero, Maximiano (1970). Historia de la unificación (Falange y Requeté en 1937) (in Spanish). Distribuciones Madrileñas.
- Garitaonaindía Garnacho, Carmelo; Granja Sáinz, José Luis de la; Pablo, Santiago de; Tuñón de Lara, Manuel (1990). Comunicación, cultura y política durante la II República y la Guerra Civil: País Vasco (1931-1939) (in Spanish). Universidad del País Vasco. ISBN 9788475852690.
- Jérez Riesco, José Luis (2006). El Madrid de la Falange (in Spanish). Nueva República.
- Martín de la Guardia, Ricardo (1994). "El modelo propagandístico en la prensa del movimiento ante el aislamiento internacional: Libertad de Valladolid, 1945-1951". Investigaciones históricas: Época moderna y contemporánea (in Spanish) (14): 237–258. ISSN 0210-9425.
- Martín Jiménez, Ignacio (2000). La guerra civil en Valladolid, 1936-1939. Amaneceres ensangrentados (in Spanish). Ámbito. ISSN 0048-7694.
- Núñez Seixas, Xosé M. (2015). "Falangismo, nacionalsocialismo y el mito de Hitler en España (1931-1945)" (PDF). Revista de Estudios Políticos (in Spanish) (169): 13–43. doi:10.18042/cepc/rep.169.01. ISSN 0048-7694.
- Palomares, Jesús María (1996). La Segunda República en Valladolid: Agrupaciones y Partidos políticos (in Spanish). Universidad de Valladolid.
- Rodríguez Jiménez, José Luis (1994). Reaccionarios y golpistas: la extrema derecha en España: del tardofranquismo a la consolidación de la democracia, 1967-1982 (in Spanish). Consejo Superior de Investigaciones Científicas. ISBN 84-00-07442-4.
- Sáiz, María Dolores; Seoane, María Cruz (1996). Historia del periodismo en España 3. El Siglo XX: 1898-1936 (in Spanish). Alianza Editorial.
- Sánchez Rada, Juan (1996). Prensa, del movimiento al socialismo: 60 años de dirigismo informático (in Spanish). Fragua.
- Sanz Hoya, Julián (2006). De la resistencia a la reacción: las derechas frente a la Segunda República (Cantabria, 1931-1936) (in Spanish). Universidad de Cantabria.
- Tusell, Javier; Soto Carmona, Álvaro (1995). Historia de la transición y consolidación democrática en España (1975-1986) (in Spanish). Universidad Nacional de Educación a Distancia.
- VV.AA. (1987). Censura y literaturas peninsulares (in Spanish). Diálogos hispánicos de Ámsterdam.
- Vila-San Juan, José Luis (1975). García Lorca, asesinado: toda la verdad (in Spanish). Planeta. ISBN 9788432056109.
