= Mottos of Francoist Spain =

Francoist Spain's coat of arms incorporates the mottos "Una Grande Libre" and Plus Ultra. It consists of the traditional Spanish escutcheon (the arms of Castile, León, Aragon, Navarre and Granada), as well as other heraldic icons such as the Pillars of Hercules. It includes elements adopted from the Catholic Monarchs such as the Eagle of Saint John and the yoke and arrows. See also: Symbols of Francoism.

The mottos of Francoism are mottos which encapsulate the ideals of the Francoist dictatorship. Although the regime had many ideological influences including Traditionalism, National Catholicism, militarism, and national syndicalism, it employed Falangism in its popular movements. Falangist ideology was easily incorporated in the creation of mottos as it is believed to demonstrate a certain reluctance towards political agendas, and to favour empiricism, taking action, and the simplification of ideas.

Although these mottos originated from the activity of different right-wing intellectuals and nationalist political parties during the Second Spanish Republic, their use became widespread and proved to be an effective propaganda tool used by the Nationalist faction during the Spanish Civil War (1936–1939) in mobilising public opinion and persuading the population to conform to nationalist ideas. Mottos were also often used as political chants during Franco's dictatorship (1939–1975).

As well as achieving military victory, the Rebel, or Nationalist, faction successfully used propaganda to link the term "national" with the concept of Spain itself. This is a result of the extended period of time the regime stayed in power in the absence of any public resistance, despite clandestine opposition. Those within the regime did not all blindly support such simplifications as demonstrated in España como problema by the Falangist intellectual, Pedro Laín Entralgo. Rafael Calvo Serer responded to this with his España sin problema, expressing traditional and orthodox beliefs. These beliefs had to be adopted, as assuming a traditional stance and showcasing 'unwavering support' towards Franco was the only way to maintain any semblance of power, as highlighted by Luis Carrero Blanco when referring to Franco and everything the Caudillo represented:

[...] my loyalty to [Franco] and his work is undoubtedly sincere and completely transparent; it is unconstrained by limitations, nor is it affected by doubts or reservations [...]

During Spain's transition to democracy, not only were Francoism's mottos and symbols abandoned, but there was also a decline in the use of national symbols in general. Even referring to 'Spain' was frequently substituted by other terms (such as 'this country', though this term was already used in the Romantic period by the Spanish author Mariano José de Lara), while there was an increase in the use of terms relating to regional nationalism.

== ¡Una, Grande y Libre! (One, Great and Free) ==
Una, Grande y Libre (English: One, Great and Free or United, Great and Free) was the Francoist tripartite motto which expressed the nationalist concept of Spain as:

- 'indivisible', expressing opposition to any kind of separatism or territorial decentralization;
- 'imperial', referring to the part of the Spanish Empire established in the Americas, as well as the one that was intended to be built in Africa;
- and 'not subject to foreign influences', referring to the international Judeo-Masonic-Communist conspiracy which the Nationalists believed controlled the Soviet Union, the European democracies and the United States (until the agreements of 1953), as well as a large number of threats to the regime which were deemed anti-Spanish, communist, separatist, liberal (see also: White Terror).

The motto was created by jonsist student Juan Aparicio López (he also created the motto Por la Patria, el Pan y la Justicia; "for the Homeland, for Bread and for Justice" and was also behind the adoption of the Yoke and the Arrows as symbol of the JONS as well as the red-black flag), and was later adopted by Falange Española de las JONS along other JONS' symbols.

Una, Grande y Libre was often used at the end of speeches; The leader would exclaim three times ¡España!, and the public would successively respond to each of these shouts with ¡Una!, ¡Grande!, and finally ¡Libre! The effect was similar to the way Amen is used in church, as well as to the chant of Sieg Heil! in Nazi Germany. The ritual would continue with an almost choreographed script of ¡Arriba España!, ¡Arriba! José Antonio, ¡Presente!, Caídos por Dios y por España, ¡Presente!. ¡Viva Franco!, ¡Viva!, or just intoning ¡Franco, Franco, Franco…!

In his farewell message to the Spanish people upon his death in 1975, Franco referred to "the great task of making Spain united, great and free."

The slogan was incorporated into the Falangist anthem, Cara al Sol; it ended with the stanza ¡España una! ¡España grande! ¡España libre! (Spain, one [united]! Spain, great! Spain, free!)

== Una patria, un estado, un caudillo (one fatherland, one state, one leader) ==
Although ¡Una, Grande y Libre! was the most widespread motto under Franco's dictatorship, una Patria, un estado, un caudillo is another tripartite motto which was used extensively between 1936 and the beginning of 1940. The motto was spread by the Franco's confidant, founder of the Spanish Legion, José Millán Astray, who profoundly admired the Caudillo. In the first few months of the Spanish Civil War, when Franco was still a member of the Junta de Defensa, Millán Astray traversed the nationalist-controlled areas, particularly the provinces of Castille and Navarra, serving Franco's personal cause and convincing the troops and officers of Franco's indisputable claim as the leader of Spain.

After creating the motto ¡Viva la muerte! (Long live death!), Millán Astray adapted the Nazi Ein Volk, ein Reich, ein Führer (one people, one empire, one leader) in order to create the motto Una patria, un estado, un caudillo. When the Junta de Defensa became the Junta Técnica del Estado and Franco was named as the head of state, it became compulsory for all newspapers and postcards in the Nationalist-controlled zones to include this motto in their header.

=== Significance of the tripartite motto ===
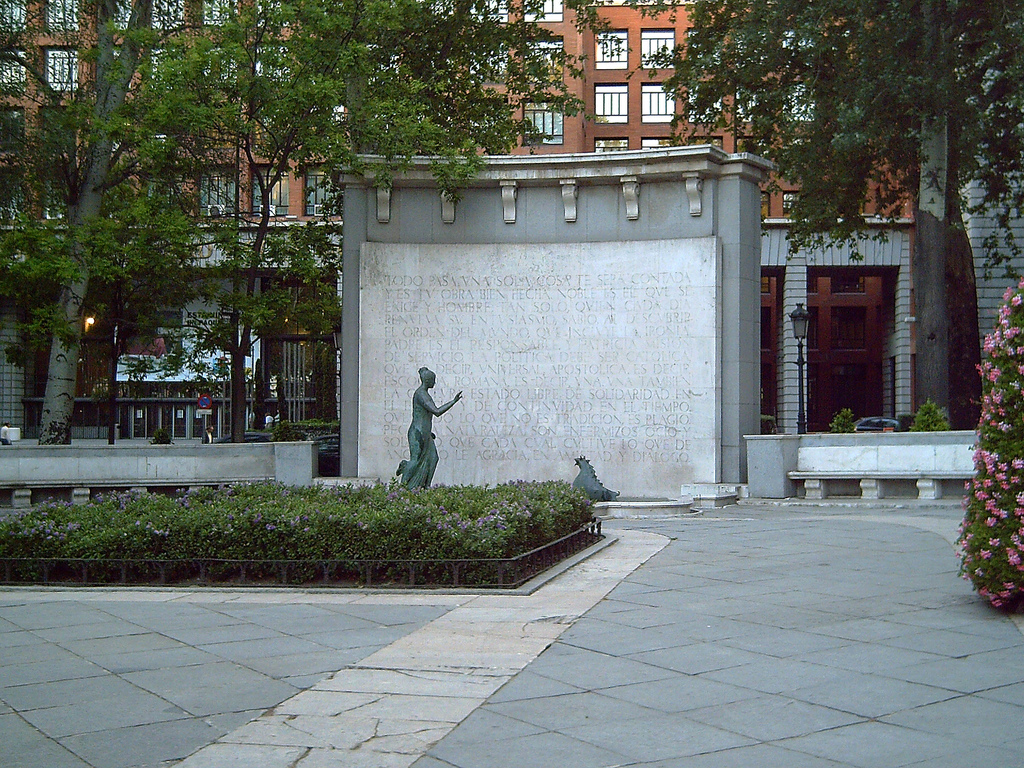
The Monument of Eugenio D'Ors in Madrid includes descriptions of parts of his work, many of which are references points of Francoist mottos.

Many Francoist slogans were purposely designed to be tripartite mottos in clear reference to religious symbolism (the Holy Trinity: the Father, the Son and the Holy Spirit). This implicitly compares Spain to the defining characteristics of the Roman Catholic Church; "Catholic" (meaning universal), "Apostolic" (meaning chosen) and "Roman" (meaning united). These comparisons must be viewed in the context of National Catholicism, an essential aspect to the Francoist ideology. Although National Catholicism was not a key component of Falangist ideology (and was sometimes even opposed by the Falangists), it was used by the Falange as a rhetorical device.

Throughout history, ideas and concepts have often been incorporated into and expressed as tripartite mottos. It is believed that this occurrence originated with Indo-European populations, who worshipped three gods as one. The social classes of these populations were also split into three categories, in a similar way to those of medieval societies and the Ancien Régime. Other tripartite mottos include "Liberté, égalité, fraternite" (liberty, equality, fraternity), created during the French Revolution; "Dios, Patria y Libertad" (God, Homeland and Freedom), used in the Dominican Republic; and "Dios, patria, rey" (God, Homeland, King) which dates back to Carlism, a traditionalist, right-wing Spanish ideology.

In addition to mottos, examples of other tripartite classifications are the Falange's categories of "natural units of political life" ("Family, town council, trade union"). Furthermore, in the philosophy of absolute idealism, the dialectical method of Hegelian theory (thesis, antithesis, synthesis) is also composed of three parts. On some occasions, these three-part classifications have been linked to a "western" or "patriarchal" way of viewing the world, which contrasts with the two-part "eastern" or "matriarchal" point of view (yin and yang).

A song written in Catalan by Joan Manuel Serrat (Temps era temps) refers to the postwar period as the "time of the ¡Una, Grande y Libre!"

== ¡Arriba España! (Up with Spain!) ==
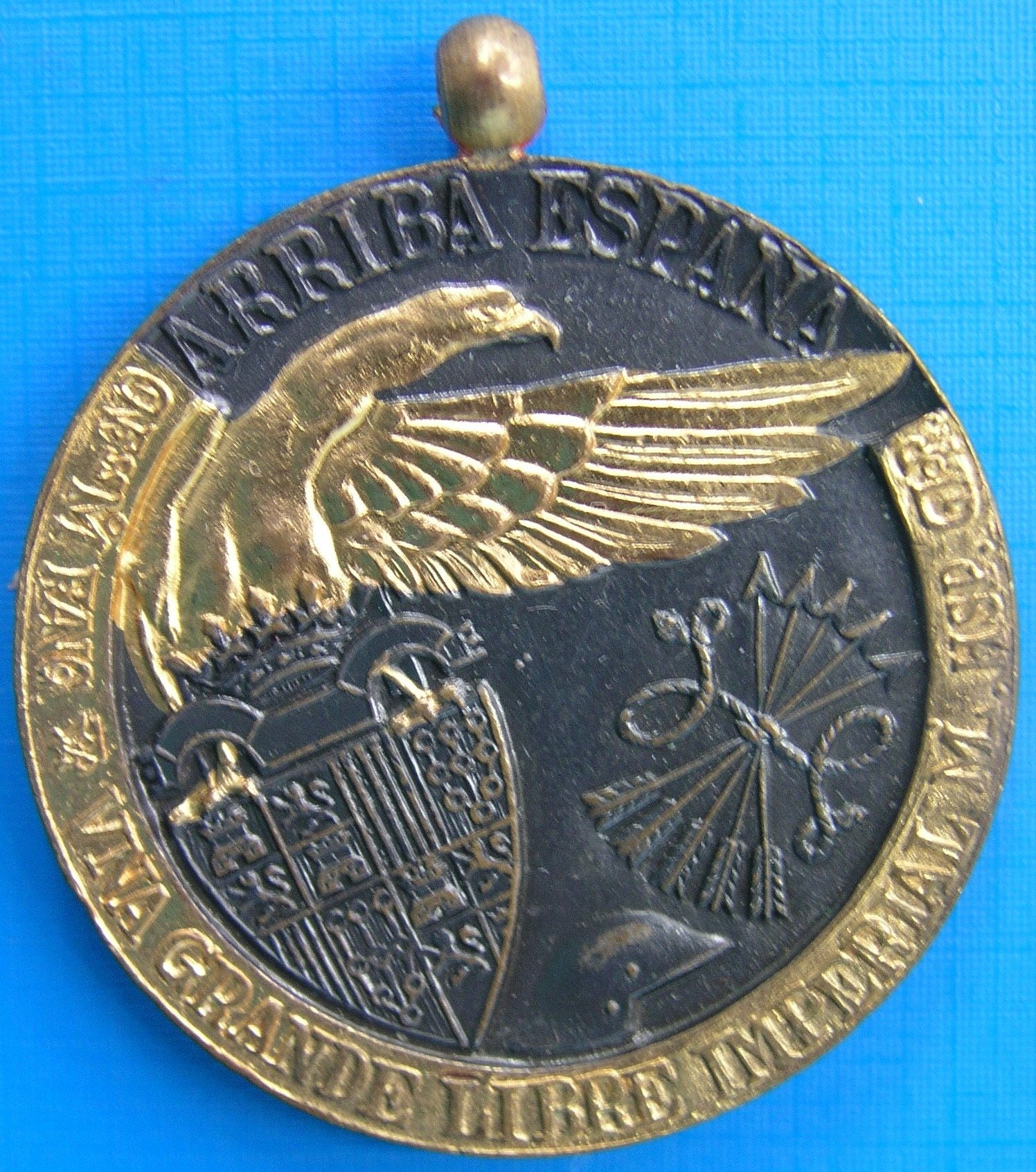
Medal commemorating the Nationalist victory of the Civil War, imprinted with the slogan Arriba España and Una Grande Libre Imperial.

The origin of the cry "Up with Spain!" is usually attributed to the Spanish writer and reformer Ricardo Macías Picavea in 1899, and was later proposed by the Falangist pioneer Rafael Sánchez Mazas. The decision to use 'up' instead of 'long live' was justified on the basis that the term 'live' was insufficient. The word 'up' conveys the idea of Spanish patriots standing at attention, asserting their active willingness to improve Spain. It also resonated with the providential belief that all events are predetermined by God.

Spain's ultimate triumph lies in security and faith. In this way, security and faith will mean a Spain that's one, great and free, one which will triumph in the way we have always hoped for. This will allow Spain return to the way it once was, to return to its path and to its roots. Because Spain's history isn't anything more than that: a constant strive towards the highest ideals of the soul. We don't bow down to low, minor or insignificant things. We serve nothing but the highest and greatest. Therefore, in saying "Up with Spain", we summarise our history and, at the same time, illustrate our hope. Because what we want is for Spain to return to its "rightful place", to the place it has been assigned by history. And that place is "up", meaning up above, close to the spirit, to the ideal, to faith...and above all, close to God."

— José María Pemán, 1939

== Si eres español, habla español (If you're Spanish, speak Spanish) ==
The motto 'Speak the language of the empire' was also employed, as instructed by a poster once displayed in the courtyard of the University of Barcelona. This motto was possibly inspired by Antonio de Nebrija, who wrote in 1492 that "Language was always a companion of the empire" in Gramática castellana, the first work dedicated to the Spanish language and its rules.

These mottos were used above all in Catalonia in order to discourage the use of Catalan after the region was taken over by Franco's army in the final stage of the Civil War (Barcelona was taken on 26 January 1939), and were also used in the postwar period.

== Rusia es culpable (Russia is guilty) ==
This slogan is taken from the speech Ramón Serrano Suñer made on 23 June 1941, the day after Germany invaded the Soviet Union (known as Operation Barbarossa), in which he blames Stalin's communist Russia for the Spanish Civil War, and encourages the support of Hitler's Nazi Germany in their fight against them. The quote was printed in newspapers and employed by the anti-Soviet movement which created the Blue Division, formed by volunteers and incorporated into the German army. These volunteers were believed not to affect or compromise Spain's official position of neutrality (although Franco favoured the Axis powers). Eventually, pressure from the Western powers forced Franco's government to withdraw the division.

Russia is guilty! Guilty for our civil war. Guilty for the death of José Antonio. History demands that Russia be exterminated, as does Europe's future...

— Ramón Serrano Súñer

Cliches surrounding Russia often had some truth to them, making the country an easy target that people could blame for their misfortunes. These cliches include "the Moscow Gold" (which refers to the Republic's transfer of the Bank of Spain's gold reserves during the civil war as payment for Soviet military assistance, which Franco's government demanded be returned to Spain) and the "Children of Russia" (who were evacuated from the Republican zone and, unlike those who were sent to France or other Western countries, were not allowed to return to Spain). The documentary "Los Niños de Rusia" by Jaime Camino explores this subject.

The chance for Spain to take their symbolic revenge arose during the 1964 European Nations' Cup, in which Spain's match against the Soviet Union was won by the legendary goal scored by Marcelino. Spain's use of football as an outlet of social tensions is reflected in the expression "Pan y fútbol" ("Bread and football", adapted from the phrase "Bread and circuses", used to describe a government's attempts at generating public approval through distraction.)

== Gibraltar es español (Gibraltar is Spanish) ==
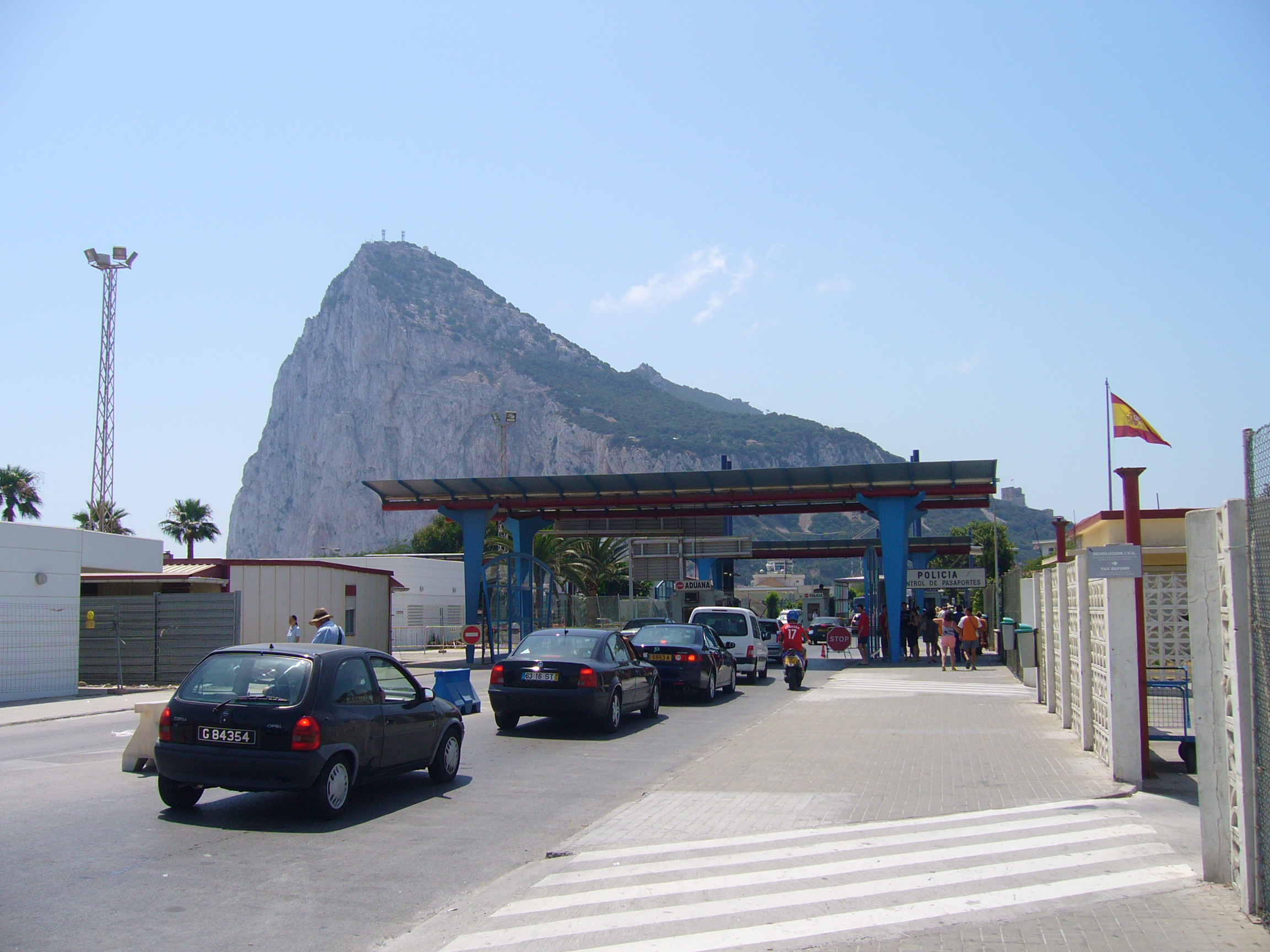
The Gibraltar-Spain border, known in Spanish as the 'iron-wrought gate of Gibraltar', was closed by the Francoist regime to exert pressure on the British Government in the hope that negotiations regarding the territory would begin. It was not reopened until the 1980s by Felipe González's government.

Gibraltar's concession to Britain in the Treaty of Utrecht in 1713 lead to a continuous demand for the territory to be reinstated as a part of Spain. However, the level of this demand varied throughout the years. The Second World War allowed Franco to take advantage of the strategic possibilities brought about by the British colony, using it in his both in negotiations with Hitler as well as his negotiations with the Allied powers, none of whom ended up facing Spain's military. After the defeat of Germany, international pressure on the Francoist regime caused the country to become isolated; this point was employed periodically in efforts to sway public opinion within Spain.

Protests, most of which were unplanned, occurred as a result of the country's anti-British sentiments, with those in attendance chanting "Spanish Gibraltar!" Notable protests are those which occurred in 1955 in reaction to Elizabeth II's visit to the British territory.

An official exhibition entitled "Spanish Gibraltar" was put on at the National Library in 1955. Surprisingly, those living in San Roque, the municipality closest to Gibraltar, avidly opposed sending a painting of the Nazarene, which was going to accompany other images (such as the Virgen Santa María Coronada and the Madre de San Roque) from the town to be displayed at the exhibition. These images were originally worshipped in Gibraltar, and were taken to San Roque by the Gibraltarians when they fled the city during the 18th century. The townspeople of San Roque feared that the painting wouldn't be returned; however, their worries were eventually overcome, and the painting was taken to the exhibition.

Displays of patriotism have led to many places (such as Almería, Alcázar de San Juan, Anchuras, Consuegra, Setenil de las Bodegas, Torredelcampo, Torrijos) having streets named "Spanish Gibraltar."

== Opposition to Francoist mottos ==
As discussed in an opinion piece by Anton Reixa, during Franco's dictatorship there were those who responded to the above Francoist mottos with parodies such as 'There's only one Spain (because if there were another, we'd all be there.)'

People also opposed the regime in more subtle ways such as by chanting the last part of the motto Una, Grande y Libre louder than the others, emphasizing the word "Free". This form of protest is illustrated in the film Las trece rosas (2007), which focuses on a group of girls awaiting a death sentence in the Ventas Prison in Madrid in 1939. Coincidentally, one of the reasons for their imprisonment is the distribution of propaganda containing a motto opposing Franco: menos Franco y más pan blanco (Less Franco and more white bread). This can be interpreted as a response both to the chants of 'Franco, Franco' as well as a criticism of Francoist slogans like "No house without a fireplace nor a Spaniard without bread", a motto which was printed on the packages of bread which were used to 'bombard' the Republican rearguard in the final stages of the Civil War in order to showcase the superiority and alleged benevolence of the rebel faction, as well as the hunger which prevailed in the Republican zones.

== See also ==
- África empieza en los Pirineos
- Symbols of Francoism
- Movimiento Nacional
- Francoist Spain
- Sociological Francoism
- Nationalism
- Propaganda in Spain
