= La Conquista del Estado =

Spanish magazine

- Categories: Political magazine
- Frequency: Weekly
- Founded: 1931
- Final issue: 1931
- Country: Spain
- Based in: Madrid
- Language: Spanish

La Conquista del Estado (English: "The Conquest of the State") was a magazine based in Madrid, Spain.

== History and profile ==
La Conquista del Estado was launched in 1931 by Ramiro Ledesma Ramos. The first issue, issued on 14 March 1931, contained a manifesto in which National Syndicalism was elaborated. Ledesma's idea was to win over the Confederación Nacional del Trabajo (CNT), the then dominant trade union movement in the country, to a form of national corporatism. The ideas in the essay were discussed during the CNT congress in the summer of 1931 without being approved.

On the other hand, despite the magazine being inspired from the views of Adolf Hitler, the founders of the magazine did not endorse his views on racism and argued that it should be replaced with the notion of Spain's imperial past.

Members of the organizing committee of La Conquista del Estado were Ramiro Ledesma Ramos (president), Juan Aparicio López (secretary), Ernesto Giménez Caballero, Ricardo de Jaspe Santoma, Manuel Souto Vilas, Antonio Bermúdez Cañete, Francisco Mateos González, Alejandro M. Raimúndez, Ramón Iglesias Parga, Antonio Riaño Lanzarote and Roberto Escribano Ortega.

The small group around La Conquista del Estado was based in the universities of Madrid. On 10 October the group around La Conquista del Estado merged with the Valladolid-based Juntas Castellanas de Actuación Hispánica to form the Juntas de Ofensiva Nacional-Sindicalista.

In total 23 issues of La Conquista del Estado were published during 1931. Generally the publication was weekly, but was suspended during August and September. The last issue was published on 24 October.

== See also ==
- List of magazines in Spain
