= Tanto monta, monta tanto, Isabel como Fernando =

Alleged prenuptial motto of the Spanish monarchs

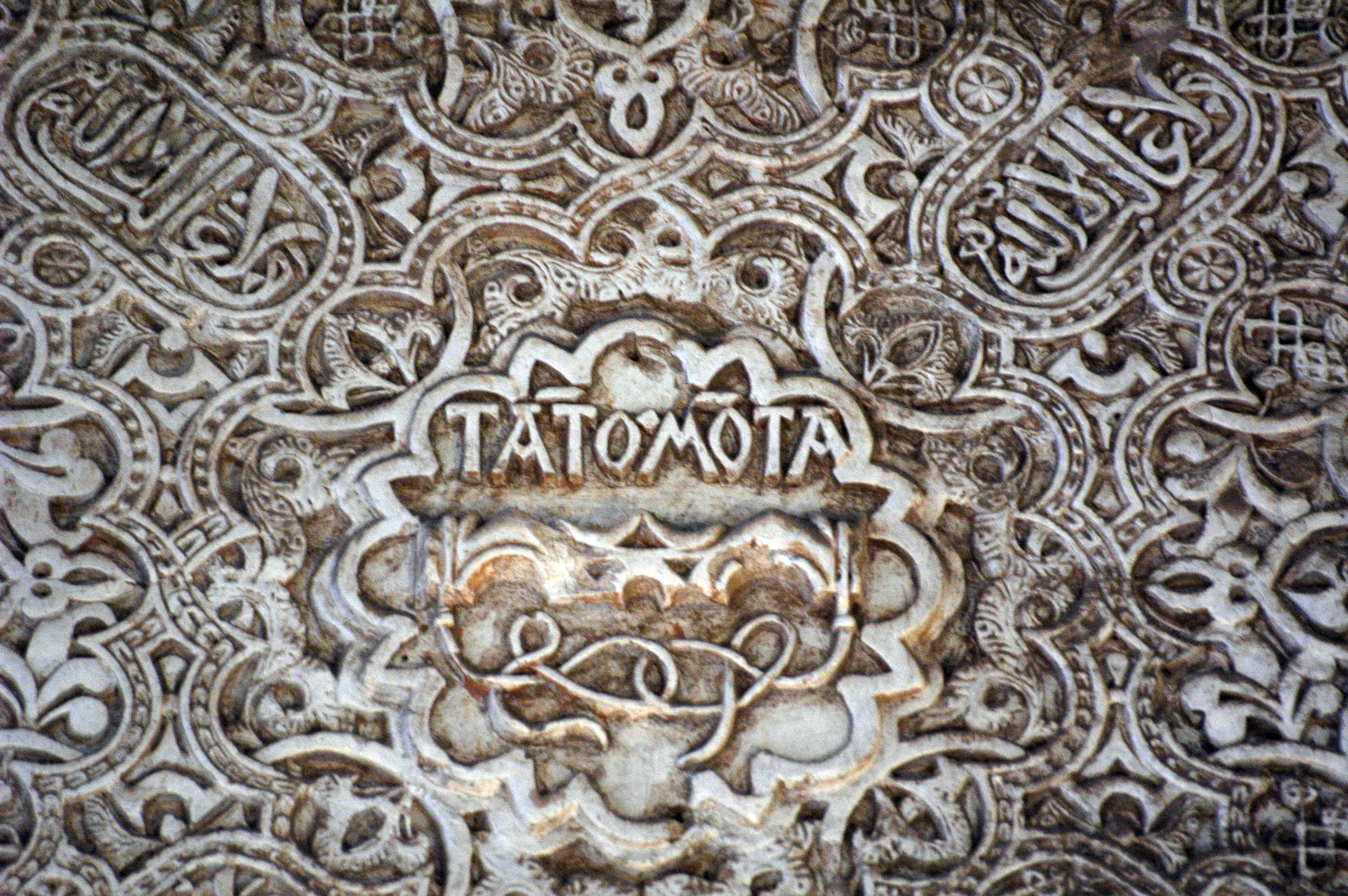
"Tãto mõta" ("tanto monta") as inscribed on the Moorish Alhambra Palace in Granada.

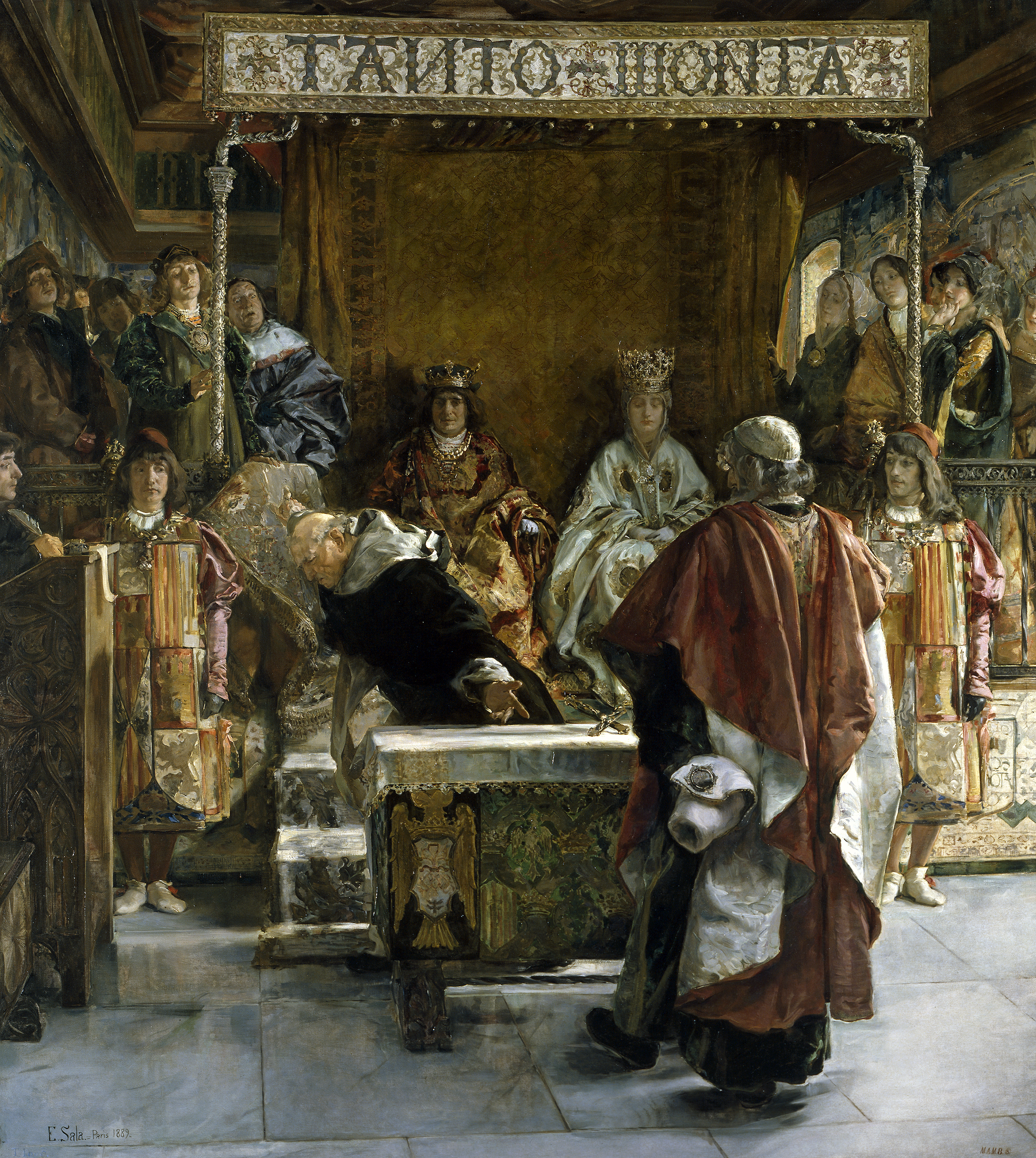
The motto TANTO MONTA is included in this 1889 oil painting by Emilio Sala Francés, illustrating [the role played by Torquemada (the Grand Inquisitor) in events leading up to] The Expulsion of the Jews from Spain in 1492

Arms of the Catholic Monarchs.

Tanto monta, monta tanto, Isabel como Fernando (pronounced [ˈtanto ˈmonta, ˈmonta ˈtanto, isaˈβel ˈkomo feɾˈnando]) or simply Tanto monta, monta tanto ("They amount to the same, the same they amount to") was the alleged motto of a prenuptial agreement made by the Spanish Catholic Monarchs Isabella I of Castile and Ferdinand II of Aragon. During their joint reign they did in fact support each other effectively in accordance with their motto of equality. Still, the wording "Tanto monta, monta tanto, Isabel como Fernando" is actually a popular saying invented many centuries later, not the real motto. Besides, and contrary to popular belief, Tanto monta was only the motto of King Ferdinand of Aragon, and never used by Isabella.

The Catholic Monarchs' great sword kept in the Royal Armoury of Madrid, made in the 15th century, was used during the reign of Ferdinand II of Aragon and Isabella of Castile and in all solemn court occasions until the 18th century. With this sword, the Catholic Monarchs Ferdinand and Isabella knighted Christopher Columbus on his return from his first voyage to America. In the Throne Hall of the Royal Palace in Barcelona, Columbus was named "Admiral of the Ocean" and "Viceroy of the Indies". This ceremonial sword was used as the symbol of the royal power in all religious and political ceremonies starting with the conquest of Granada and the beginning of Spain as a nation. On its hand guard it bears the inscription "Tanto monta, monta tanto" that translates roughly to "As much as the one is worth, so too is the other."

== Gordian knot ==
Another version holds that the motto comes from the proverb Tanto monta cortar como desatar ("It amounts to the same, cutting as untying"), from the Classical story of the Gordian knot where Alexander the Great, wanting to untie the knot of a sacred yoke at Gordion to fulfill the prophecy of the conquest of Asia, decided to cut it with his sword. Hence it is associated to the yoke in the emblem of the yoke and arrows.

The motto Tanto monta, monta tanto appeared on the Spanish Royal Standard of the Catholic Monarchs from 1492–1506. Romantic painters represented it on the Spanish flags that Christopher Columbus brought to the New World, but there is no proof that he actually carried them. Later the motto was changed to Plus Ultra which is Latin for "further beyond" referring to Spain and its lands in the Americas.
