= Workers' University of Córdoba =

Former educational institution in Spain

The Workers’ University of Córdoba (Universidad Laboral de Córdoba) was inaugurated on 5 November 1956 under the name of Onésimo Redondo in Córdoba, Spain. Located at "km 395" of the old motorway to Madrid, its estate covered an area of over 20 hectares.

The Workers’ University consisted of six colleges named after personalities from the city of Córdoba: San Rafael, Luis de Góngora, Juan de Mena, Gran Capitán, San Álvaro and San Alberto Magno. There were workshops for professional training, theory classrooms, dining halls, a logistics centre, a bakery, laundry and maintenance services, as well as sports facilities including a running track, swimming pools, gyms and accommodation for teaching staff.

Among the premises of the Workers’ University, the main hall stood out, where offices, the Secretary and the church were located. In 1981 it was transformed into the Centre for Integral Studies (Centro de Estudios Integrados CEI), and later into two secondary level teaching institutions: the I.E.S. Gran Capitán and the I.E.S. Alhaken II.

Among the hundreds of lecturers and the thousands of students of the University during its thirty years of operation, we can remember:

- Francisco Zueras Torréns, painter, muralist, writer and scholar.
- José Luis García Pantaleón, veterinarian and biologist.
- Santiago Pérez Gago (Father Gago), educator and linguist.
- Padre Naranjo, educator
- Ricardo Cuadrado Tapias, Father Richard.
- Juan Antonio Olmo Cascos, student of the ‘11th Promotion I.’ Technician and creator of the website http://www.laboraldecordoba.es
- Antonio Colinas, student for three years and poet.
- Desiderio Vaquerizo Gil, student for three years, lecturer, writer and novelist.
- Ramón Garrido Palomo, student for three years, paediatrician, chair of the Medical School of Ciudad Real and chair of the Autonomous Council of Medical Schools of Castile-La-Mancha.

== Sports ==
The old Workers’ University, nowadays Rabanales Campus of Córdoba University, had among its sports facilities the first air-conditioned indoor competition swimming pool and the first rugby pitch in Córdoba.
