= Quintanilla de Onésimo =

Coordinates: 41°37′N 4°21′W

Quintanilla de Onésimo, Spain
- Coat of arms

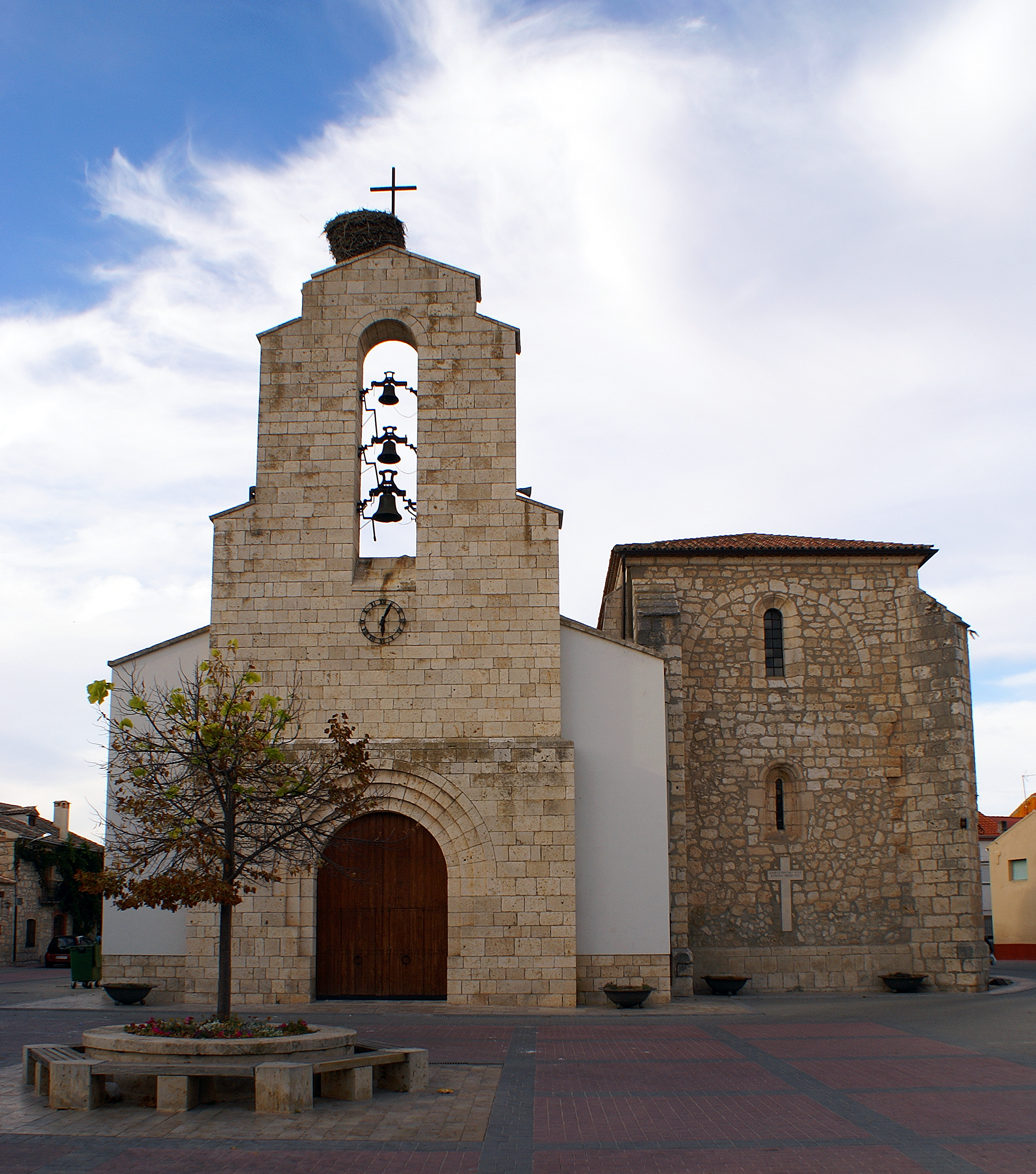
- church
- Country: Spain
- Autonomous community: Castile and León
- Province: Valladolid
- Municipality: Quintanilla de Onésimo

Area
  - Total: 55 km^{2} (21 sq mi)

Population (2025-01-01)
  - Total: 1,043
  - Density: 19/km^{2} (49/sq mi)
- Time zone: UTC+1 (CET)
  - Summer (DST): UTC+2 (CEST)

Quintanilla de Onésimo is a municipality located in the province of Valladolid, Castile and León, Spain. According to the 2004 census from the National Statistics Institute, the municipality has a population of 1,139 inhabitants.

The municipality was originally known as Quintanilla de Abajo, but was renamed in 1941 in honour of Onésimo Redondo (1905-1936), who was born there. Redondo was a founder of the Castilian Juntas of Hispanic Action (JCAH) and a prominent member of the Falange. He was killed in combat in 1936 during the Spanish Civil War.

== See also ==
- Cuisine of the province of Valladolid
