= Gabriel Arias-Salgado =

Spanish politician (1904–1962)

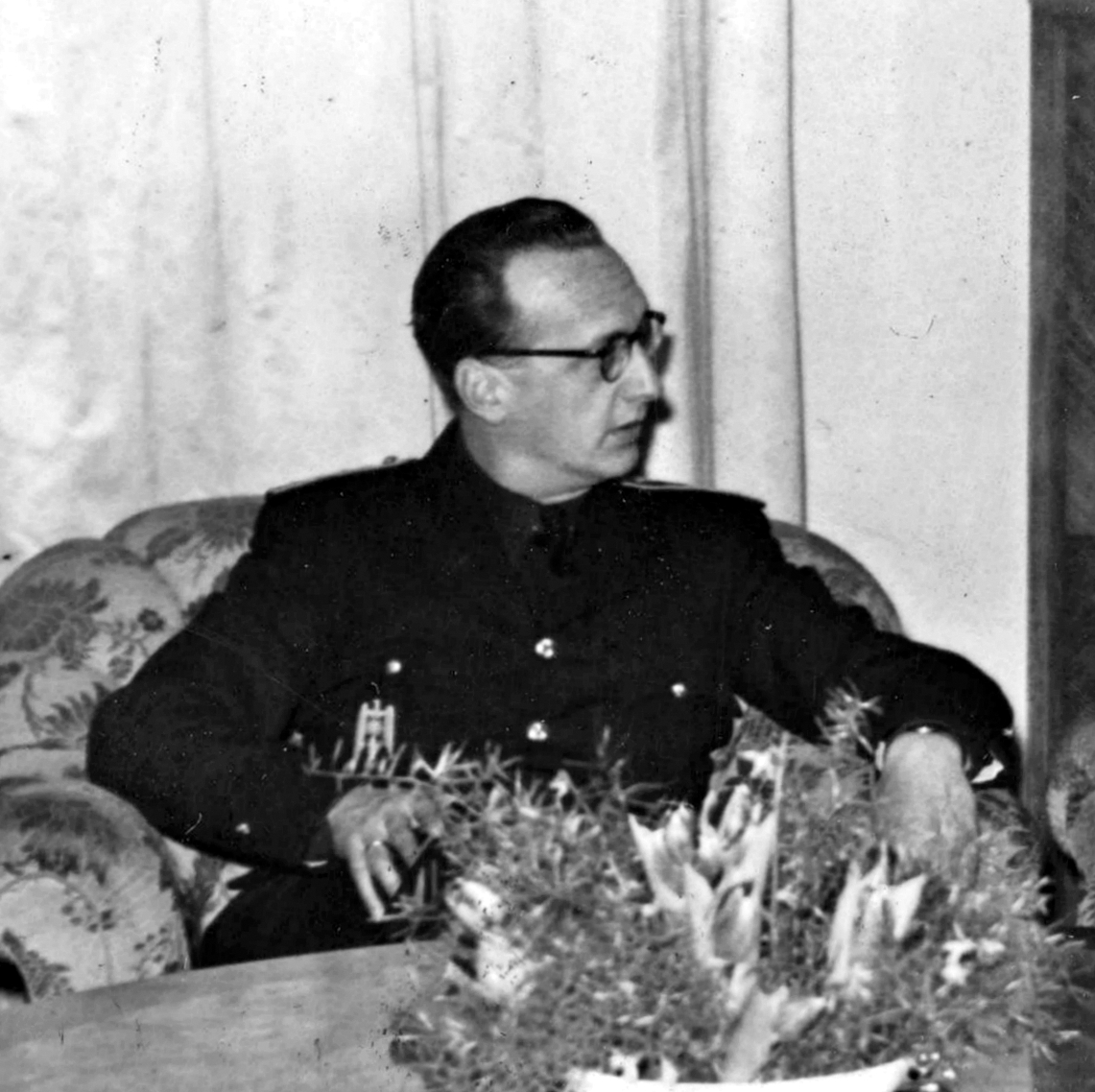

Civil Governor of Salamanca
- In office 27 August 1938 – 9 May 1941
- Preceded by: Jesús Ferrer Gimeno
- Succeeded by: José Ximénez de Sandoval

Vice Secretary of Popular Education
- In office 6 September 1941 – 27 July 1945
- Leader: Francisco Franco

Minister of Information and Tourism
- In office 19 July 1951 – 11 July 1962
- Leader: Francisco Franco
- Preceded by: Position established
- Succeeded by: Manuel Fraga Iribarne

Personal details
- Born: Gabriel Arias-Salgado; 3 March 1904 Madrid, Spain
- Died: 26 July 1962 (aged 58) Madrid, Spain
- Party: FET y de las JONS

Gabriel Arias–Salgado Montalvo (3 March 1904 – 26 July 1962) was a Spanish politician who served as the Minister of Information and Tourism from 1951 to 1962.

Born in Madrid, he joined the Falange during the course of the Civil War, embarking on a rapid rise in his political career. In Francoist Spain, he played a major role in censorship, holding the positions of Vice-Secretary of Popular Education and, later, Minister of Information and Tourism. Likewise, he was also a solicitor in the Francoist courts and a member of the National Council of the Movement.

== Biography ==
=== Early years ===
Born in Madrid on 3 March 1904, he studied at the Colegio Nuestra Señora del Recuerdo de Chamartín. Subsequently, he graduated in Classical Languages and Humanities, also receiving a doctorate in philosophy and specializing in theology.

In 1937, after the Civil War had started, he joined the rebel zone. A man from Catholic fundamentalism, he would later become a convinced Falangist. During the war he joined FET and the JONS, making a rapid political career within the Francoist Spain. In August 1938, he was appointed director of the Falangist weekly Libertad based in Valladolid, which under his direction began to be published on a daily basis. At that time he also held the position of civil governor of Salamanca, as well as that of provincial head of FET and of the JONS.

=== Vice Secretary of Popular Education ===
In September 1941, he was appointed Deputy Secretary of Popular Education. From then on, Arias-Salgado was in charge of powers such as the regime's press or propaganda; until then these had been powers under the control of the Ministry of the Interior. (Note: Arias-Salgado came to succeed Antonio Tovar, who had previously been Undersecretary of Press and Propaganda.) Among some of its measures was the founding of the Official School of Journalism – whose inauguration in 1942 was attended by Arias-Salgado and Juan Aparicio, and the creation of the NO-DO – acronym for "News and Documentaries" – on 26 September 1942. In the Vice Secretary for Popular Education, he had the close collaboration of Juan Aparicio, national press delegate. On the contrary, he had frequent confrontations with Ramón Serrano Suñer, who was foreign minister who recently had controlled the press. He would also maintain bad relations with Serrano's successor, Francisco Gómez-Jordana, in relation to published information on foreign policy.

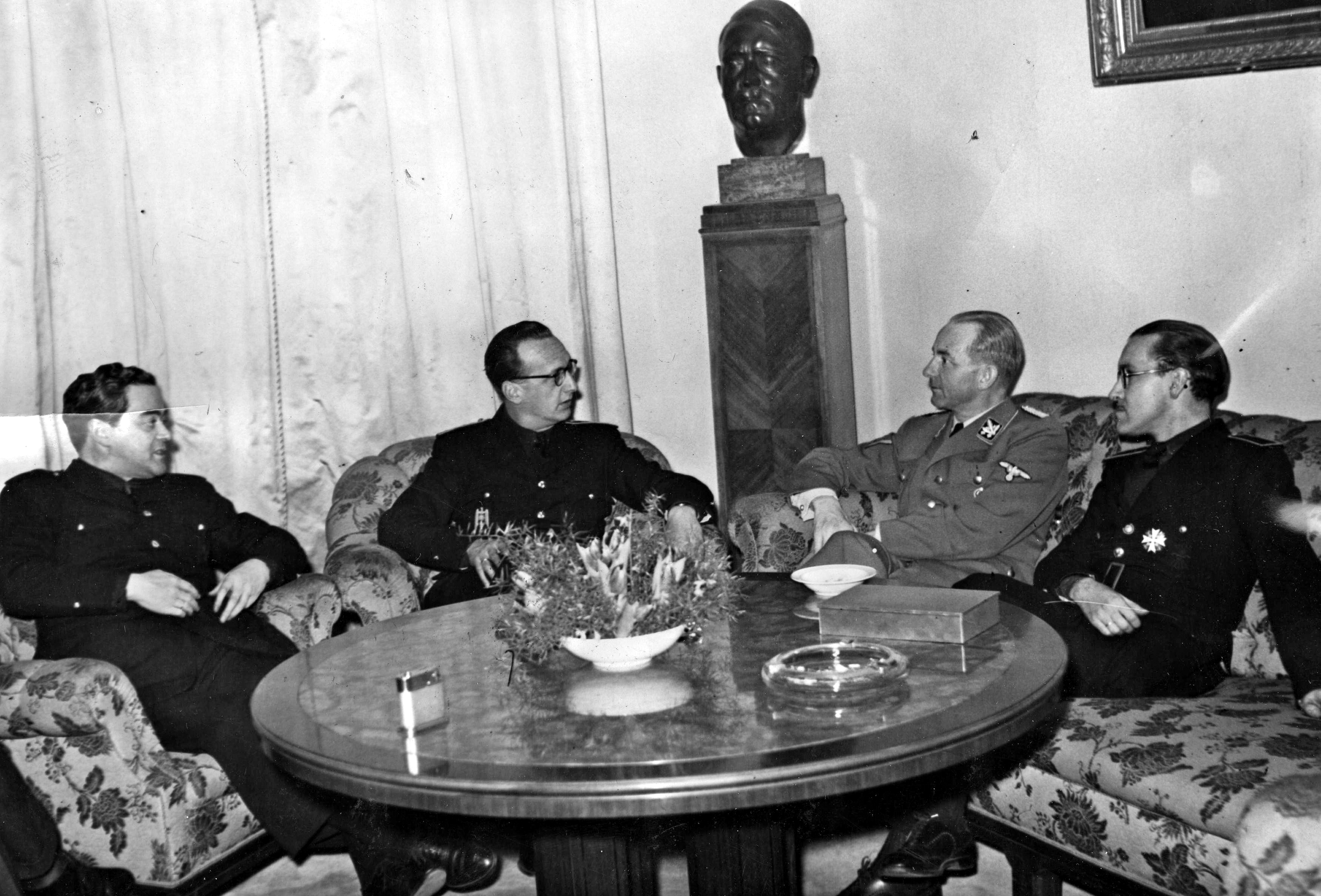
Gabriel Arias-Salgado with Otto Dietrich, in Berlin (1943). (Note: Also featured in the photograph are Víctor de la Serna, director of Informaciones and Xavier de Echarri, director of Arriba.)

A Germanophile and sympathizer of the fascist powers, in January 1943 he was part of the entourage that accompanied the Minister-Secretary General José Luis Arrese on his visit to Nazi Germany, along with other prominent Falangists, such as Manuel Valdés Larrañaga, Agustín Aznar, Manuel Martínez de Tena, Víctor de la Serna and Xavier de Echarri. In these years the press used to follow the victories of the Axis with greater attention, while silencing the military defeats of Germany and Italy. This situation also occurred in the cinema, where Arias-Salgado enthusiastically introduced Nazi propaganda material, while taking care to exclude informational propaganda material from the Allies. Coinciding with the end of World War II and the defeat of the fascist powers, Arias-Salgado and other pro-Nazis were losing weight within the Franco dictatorship. In July 1945, the Vice Secretary for Popular Education was dissolved, and its powers was transferred to the Ministry of National Education.

During these years, he also held other positions, becoming the national press and propaganda delegate for FET and the JONS, attorney of the Francoist courts and a member of the National Council of FET and the JONS.

=== Minister of Information and Tourism ===
Considered the main theoretician and architect of Franco's censorship, he was placed in charge of the recently created Ministry of Information and Tourism, a position he held from July 1951 to 1962. His appointment came to constitute a reinforcement of official control on information. An integrist Catholic, during his ministerial stage Arias-Salgado exercised strong control over the Spanish press. The writer and propagandist José María Pemán came to describe him as "one of the most ferociously good men." In the ten years that he was in charge of the ministry, he directed the information policy from a staunch sectarianism; Arias-Salgado himself went so far as to affirm: "All freedom for the truth, no freedom for error". During these years, the Francoist cultural model was consolidated, although other new forms of communication appeared, such as television.

However, his political career came to an end in 1962. At the instigation of Arias-Salgado himself, during the month of June of that year, the official press of the regime launched a harsh campaign against the Spanish participants in the IV Congress of the European Movement, presenting a distorted imageof the meeting and coming to refer pejoratively as the "Munich Conspiracy". This campaign, however, ended up having a very negative effect on the image of the Franco regime in Europe and even on the image of the minister himself. (Note: He went so far as to affirm that the "Munich Conspiracy" had been the result of "a well-considered plan of the Antichrist", which caused astonishment.) In this context, he left the government and was replaced by Manuel Fraga.

On 26 July 1962, just a few days after his dismissal, he died of a heart attack on the stairs of his home in Madrid. (Note: According to the historian Bartolomé Bennassar, the death of Arias-Salgado would have been a consequence of his dismissal.)

== Family ==
He was the brother of Alejandro Arias-Salgado y de Cubas, who was imprisoned during the first years of Francoism. On 1 April 1942, his sentence was commuted to confinement.

He was the father of politician Rafael Arias-Salgado and the diplomat Fernando Arias-Salgado.

== Bibliography ==
- Abellán, Manuel L. (1980). Censura y creación literaria en España (1939-1976) (in Spanish). Península. ISBN 9788429716481.
- Aubert, Paul; Desvois, Jean-Michel (1996). Presse et pouvoir en Espagne. 1868-1975 (in Spanish). Maison des Pays Ibériques.
- Bardavío, Joaquín; Sinova, Justino (2000). Todo Franco. Franquismo y antifranquismo de la A a la Z (in Spanish). Plaza & Janés.
- Bennassar, Bartolomé (1996). Franco (in Spanish). EDAF. ISBN 84-414-0061-X.
- Cazorla Sánchez, Antonio (2000). Las políticas de la victoria: La consolidación del Nuevo Estado franquista (1938-1953) (in Spanish). Marcial Pons. ISBN 84-95379-19-8.
- del Arco, Manuel (1970). Los 90 ministros de Franco (in Spanish). Dopesa.
- Díaz, Onésimo; Meer, Fernando de (2010). Rafael Calvo Serer: La búsqueda de la libertad (1954-1988) (in Spanish). Rialp. ISBN 978-84-321-3833-1.
- Diez Puertas, Emeterio (2003). Historia social del cine en España (in Spanish). Editorial Fundamentos. ISBN 84-245-0951-X.
- Domínguez Arribas, Javier (2009). El enemigo judeo-masónico en la propaganda franquista, 1936-1945 (in Spanish). Marcial Pons Historia. ISBN 978-84-96467-98-9.
- Espín, Manuel (2008). Historia secreta de los años 50 (in Spanish). Ediciones Corona Borealis.
- Gubern, Román; Font, Domènec (1975). Un cine para el cadalso. 40 años de censura cinematográfica en España (in Spanish). Editorial Euros.
- Gubern, Román (1981). La censura. Función política y ordenamiento jurídico bajo el franquismo (1936-1975) (in Spanish). Península.
- León-Aguinaga, Pablo (2010). Sospechosos habituales. El cine norteamericano, Estados Unidos y la España franquista, 1939-1960 (in Spanish). Consejo Superior de Investigaciones Científicas. ISBN 978-84-00-09079-1.
- Lewis, Paul H. (2002). Latin Fascist Elites: The Mussolini, Franco, and Salazar Regimes. Greenwood publishing group.
- Marín, José María; Molinero, Carme; Ysàs, Pere (2010). Historia política de España, 1939-2000 (in Spanish). Istmo.
- Martín Puerta, Antonio (2013). El franquismo y los intelectuales: La cultura en el nacionalcatolicismo (in Spanish). Encuentro.
- Montoliú, Pedro (2005). Madrid en la posguerra, 1939-1946: Los años de la represión (in Spanish). Sílex. ISBN 84-7737-159-8.
- Morán, Gregorio (2009). Adolfo Suárez: ambición y destino (in Spanish). Random House Mondadori.
- O’Byrne, Patricia; Carty, Gabrielle; Thornton, Niamh (2010). Transcultural Encounters amongst Women. Cambridge Scholars Publishing. ISBN 978-1-4438-2073-8.
- Penella, Manuel (2009). Manuel Fraga Iribarne y su tiempo (in Spanish). Planeta.
- Pike, David Wingeate (2008). Franco and the Axis Stigma. Palgrave Macmillan. ISBN 978-1-349-30089-1.
- Redondo, Gonzalo (1999). Política, cultura y sociedad en la España de Franco (1939-1975) (in Spanish). Ediciones Universidad de Navarra.
- Rodríguez Puértolas, Julio (2008). Historia de la literatura fascista española (in Spanish). Akal.
- Rojas Claros, Francisco (2013). Dirigismo cultural y disidencia editorial en España (1962-1973) (in Spanish). Universidad de Alicante. ISBN 9788497172554.
- Seoane, María Cruz; Saíz, María Dolores (2007). Cuatro siglos de periodismo en España: de los avisos a los periódicos digitales (in Spanish). Alianza. ISBN 9788420648842.
- Sinova, Justino (2006). La censura de prensa durante el franquismo (in Spanish). DeBolsillo. ISBN 84-8346-134-X.
- Thomàs, Joan Maria (2001). La Falange de Franco: fascismo y fascistización en el régimen franquista, 1937-1945 (in Spanish). Plaza & Janés.
- Timoteo Álvarez, Jesús (1989). Historia de los medios de comunicación en España: periodismo, imagen y publicidad, 1900-1990 (in Spanish). Ariel.
- Tosantos, Carlos María (2004). Cine y Periodismo. Los Complementos (in Spanish). Ediciones del Serbal.
- Urquijo Goitia, José Ramón (2008). Gobiernos y ministros españoles en la edad contemporánea (in Spanish). Consejo Superior de Investigaciones Científicas. ISBN 9788400087371.
- Vila-San Juan, José Luis (1975). García Lorca, asesinado: toda la verdad (in Spanish). Planeta. ISBN 9788432056109.
