= Agrarian Trade Union Federation =

National-syndicalist trade union in Spain

Agrarian Trade Union Federation (in Spanish: Federación Sindical Agraria) was a national-syndicalist trade union in Spain, founded in 1933 in Castile. The federation was linked to the Juntas de Ofensiva Nacional-Sindicalista. The federation served as the official labor wing of the JONS, established to organize agricultural workers in Castile around national-syndicalist principles. Its founding in 1933 coincided with a period of expansion for the JONS, which had been concentrating its organizing efforts among students in Madrid and peasants and workers in the Valladolid area. The federation's ideological platform centered on the right to permanent work and bread, the abolition of forced unemployment, and the principle that industrial and financial capital should not control national destinies. When the JONS merged with the Falange Española to form the Falange Española de las JONS on 4 March 1934, the Agrarian Trade Union Federation was absorbed into the new organization's syndical structure, which eventually became the basis for the Francoist Spanish Syndical Organization established in 1940.

== Sources ==
- La Organización Sindical Española, Escuela Sindical 1961. 1961: Madrid, page 33.
