= Coat of arms of Panama City =

- Armiger: Panama City
- Adopted: 1521 (designed); 1909 (adopted)
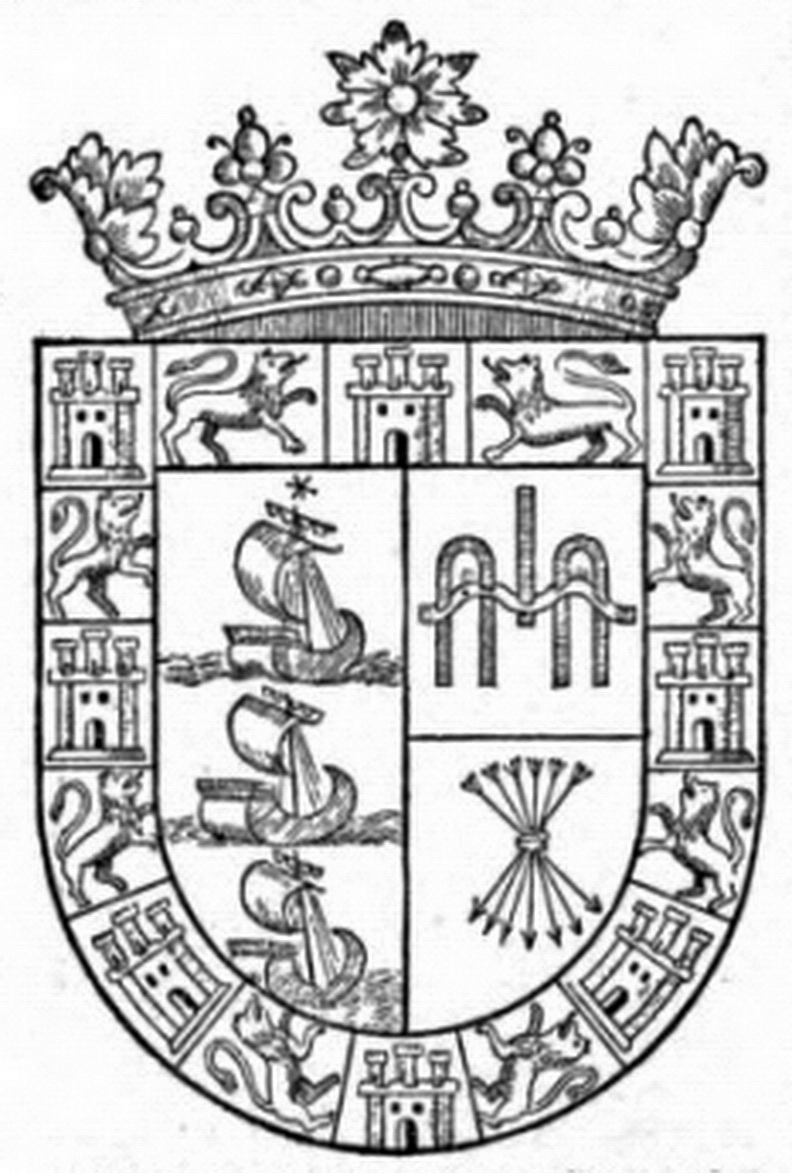
- Earlier version(s): Arms of the city of Panamá Viejo.
- Use: Official documents; On the flag of the municipality.; Painted, sculpted or on plaques on the façades of municipal buildings.; Vehicles belonging to the municipality.

The coat of arms of Panama City was granted by King Charles I of Spain via Royal Charter issued in Burgos, on 15 September, 1521. The coat of arms was granted as part of the municipality achieving the status of City.

== History ==
King Charles I of Spain, by means of the Royal Decree of Burgos, dated 15 September of 1521, granted the title of City to Panama, for which it is also granted a coat of arms to represent it before the Spanish authorities. Thus a design is approved which the Royal Charter described as follows (loosely translated):

For arms: an inescutcheon or divided per pale; in dexter, a yoke and a bundle of arrows brunatre, tipped azure and fletched argent to represent the Catholic King and Queen and our parents and grandparents and lords who have so much glory; in sinister, two caravels as a sign that we hope in our Lord that spectacular discoveries will be made there, and above them a star representing the southern pole; and on a border compony of the inescutcheon, castles and lions in orle. This Royal Decree is issued in Burgos, on the fifteenth day of September, one thousand five hundred and twenty one.

Because the city was besieged and destroyed in the year 1671 thanks to the attack of the English pirate Henry Morgan, the original design of the coat of arms was lost and since then several versions were used that tried to match the original description, failing several times in the attempt. Some time after the separation of Panama from Colombia in 1903, the Municipal Council of Panama City approved the agreement N° 54, which reaffirmed the will of King Charles I of Spain to grant the hamlet of fishermen the title of city and its own coat of arms, by means of the Royal Charter that was conceived in Burgos on September 15, 1521.

However, despite this, there was still confusion as to which version was more in line with the original description, until 1992, when the Municipal Council adopted Resolution No. 66, which initiated a historical-legal investigation to establish a coat of arms in accordance with the original description, and then published a version which is currently used by the municipal council and which is the version most in line with the original description.

== See also ==
- Coat of arms of Panama
