= Labajos =

- Municipality
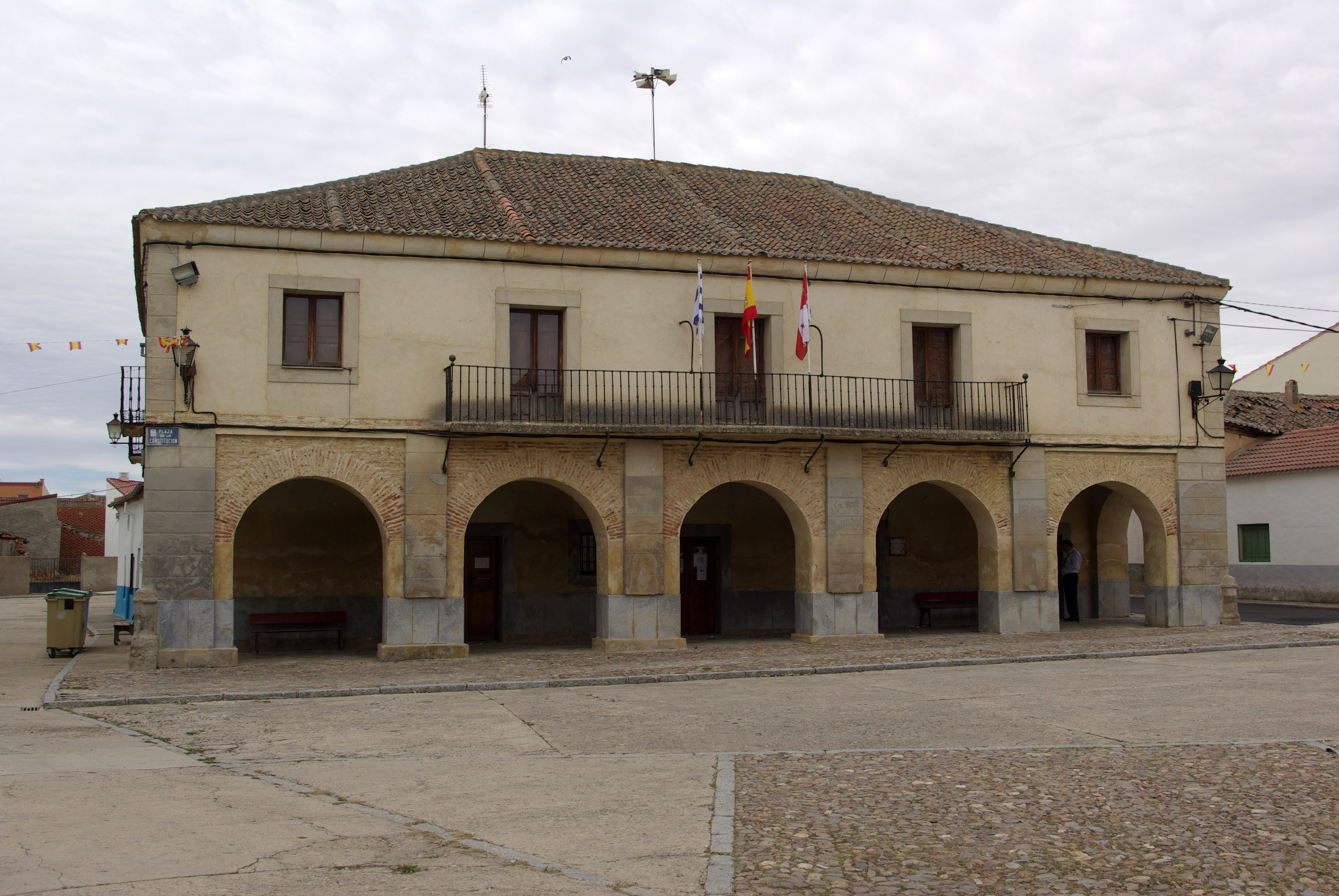
- Town Hall in Labajos. Segovia, Spain.

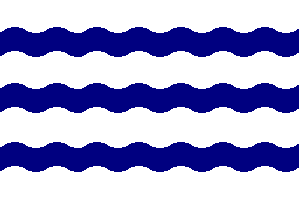
- Flag Coat of arms

- Location in Spain. Labajos (Spain)
- Coordinates: 40°50′35″N 4°31′11″W
- Country: Spain
- Autonomous community: Castile and León
- Province: Segovia
- Municipality: Labajos

Area
  - Total: 20 km^{2} (7.7 sq mi)
- Elevation: 1,064 m (3,491 ft)

Population (2025-01-01)
  - Total: 105
  - Density: 5.3/km^{2} (14/sq mi)
- Time zone: UTC+1 (CET)
  - Summer (DST): UTC+2 (CEST)
- Website: Official website

Labajos is a municipality located in the province of Segovia, Castile and León, Spain. According to the 2018 census (INE), the municipality has a population of 116 inhabitants.
