= Onésimo Redondo =

Spanish Falangist politician (1905–1936)

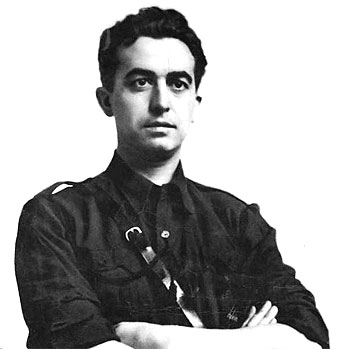
- Onésimo Redondo in 1930
- Born: Onésimo Redondo Ortega; 16 February 1905; Quintanilla de Onésimo, Valladolid, Kingdom of Spain
- Died: 24 July 1936 (aged 31); Labajos, Segovia, Spain
- Cause of death: Killed in action
- Monuments: Monument to Onésimo Redondo (now demolished)
- Education: University of Salamanca
- Occupations: Lawyer, professor, writer, political activist
- Years active: Mid-1920s–1936
- Known for: Francoist propaganda
- Political party: Juntas Castellanas de Actuación Hispánica; Juntas de Ofensiva Nacional-Sindicalista; Falange Española
- Spouse: Mercedes Sanz-Bachiller (m. 1931–1936)

Onésimo Redondo Ortega (16 February 1905 – 24 July 1936) was a Spanish Falangist politician. He founded the Juntas Castellanas de Actuación Hispánica, a political group that merged with Ramiro Ledesma's Juntas de Ofensiva Nacional-Sindicalista and José Antonio Primo de Rivera's Falange Española.

Together with Ledesma and Primo de Rivera, Redondo was one of the key figures of Francoist propaganda.

== Biography ==
Redondo was born in Quintanilla de Abajo (renamed after him as Quintanilla de Onésimo), Valladolid to a family of landowners. His father was Buenaventura Redondo Iglesias and his mother was Juana Ortega Pico. He studied jurisprudence at the University of Salamanca and subsequently taught Spanish at the University of Mannheim (1927–1928), where he became acquainted with Nazism. Historian Paul Preston has written that Redondo's anti-Semitism derived more from fifteenth century Castile than from Nazi models however, though he did translate Hitler's Mein Kampf into Spanish. He worked in Valladolid for the Castilian union of sugar beet harvesters and joined the Acción Nacional during his youth. He was greatly influenced by Enrique Herrera Oria, brother of the founder of the Asociación Nacional Católica de Propagandistas and editor of El Debate, Ángel Herrera Oria. Enrique Herrera believed that communism, Freemasonry and Judaism were working to destroy religion and the Fatherland, and encouraged Redondo to read the virulent anti-Jewish tract by Léon de Poncins, Las fuerzas secretas de la Revolucion.

When the Second Republic was proclaimed in 1931, and after the elections of June 1931 gave a majority to the Republican-Socialist coalition, he rejected democracy and broke from Acción Nacional. On 13 June in Valladolid he brought out the anti-Republican newspaper Libertad, where he wrote violently against Marxism, Jews (he published an annotated translation of The Protocols of the Elders of Zion), and bourgeois Capitalism, and admired European fascisms. He founded a fascist party, Juntas Castellanas de Actuación Hispánica (the Castilian Hispanic Action Groups) in August 1931 and in November it merged with Ramiro Ledesma Ramos's La Conquista del Estado to form the Juntas de Ofensiva Nacional Sindicalista (JONS). They refused to participate in elections because they believed in direct action. It was anti-democratic and imperialist and sought the "extermination of the Marxist parties". Redondo and the JHAC sought violent confrontation and recruits armed themselves for street fights with the predominantly Socialist working class of Valladolid, a city previously noted for the tranquility of its labor relations.

In Redondo's rhetoric, Moors, Jews, and the Left were all merged into one: by asserting that Marxism was a Jewish invention and implied the 're-Africanisation' of Spain, Redondo was identifying Spain's archetypal others, the Jew and the Moor with the Right's new enemy: the Left. The war Spain needed to fight was a new 'Reconquista', and ideologues such as Redondo's offered a 'murderous justification of violence against the left.'

In 1932, he collaborated with the frustrated coup d'état of General Sanjurjo and had to flee to Portugal. He returned to Valladolid in April 1933. On 24 March 1934 JONS and Falange Española merged. He was arrested on 19 March 1936, and was moved to the prison in Ávila in June. He was freed by the Nationalists after the beginning of the Civil War. He organized the Falange's militias in Valladolid and commanded the so-called "dawn patrols" that were responsible for the murder of hundreds of suspected liberals and leftists in Valladolid. He then left for the Guadarrama mountains, where he died in combat in Labajos, Segovia on July 24. Francoist propaganda extolled him insistently as a war hero.

== Legacy ==
His widow, Mercedes Sanz-Bachiller, founded Auxilio de Invierno (Winter Aid), after Auxilio Social (Social Aid), which was the welfare agency of Falange, further fully integrated in the Francoist State organization.

The Workers' University of Córdoba was established in 1956 as Universidad Laboral "Onésimo Redondo" de Córdoba.

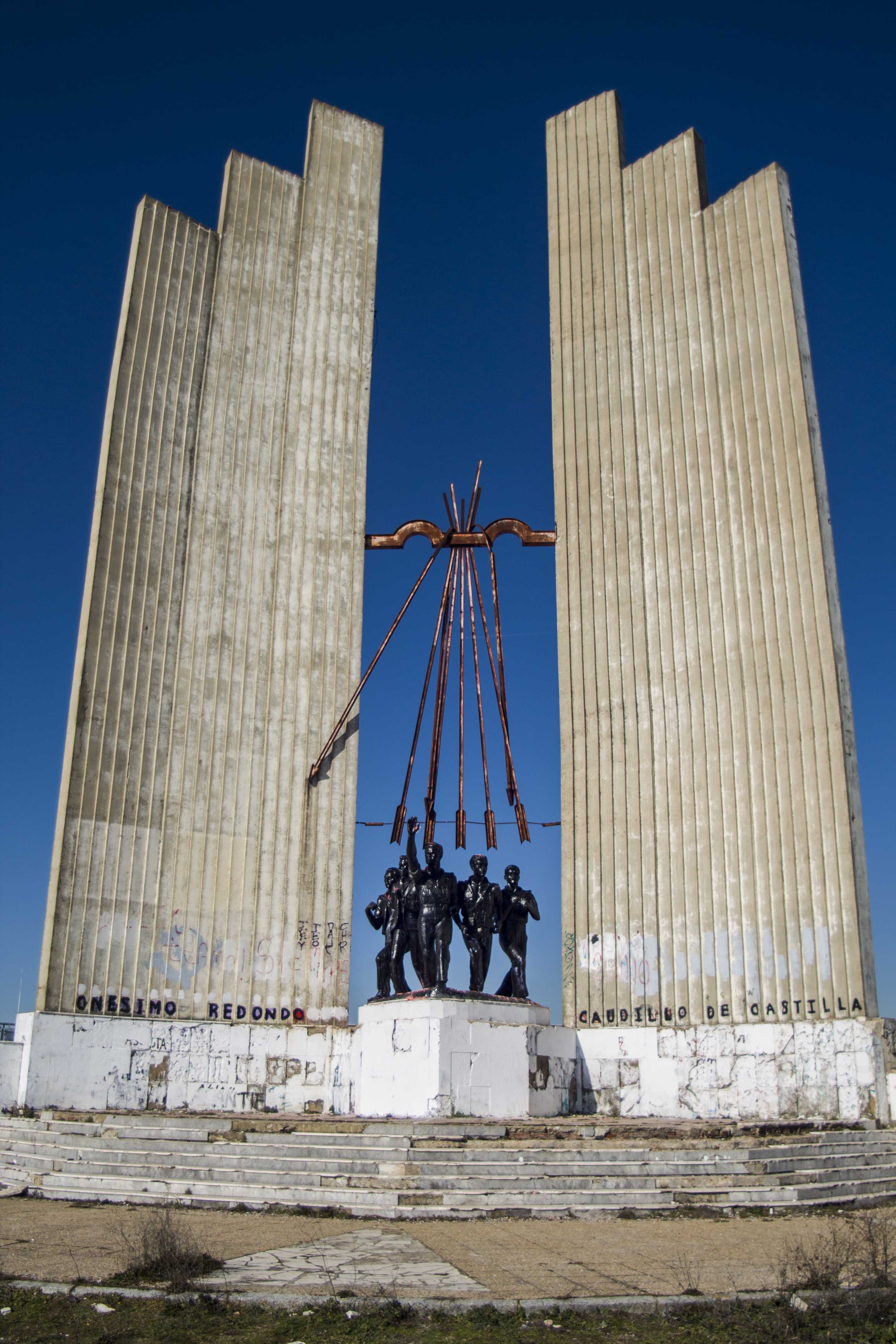
Monument to Onésimo Redondo, Valladolid (demolished 2016)

A monument to Redondo was erected on top of Cerro San Cristóbal, at the southern end of the municipality of Valladolid. The Monument to Onésimo Redondo was inaugurated in 1961, and demolished in compliance with the Historical Memory Law in February 2016.

== Writings ==
- Protocolos de los Sabios de Sión, Valladolid: Libertad, 1932 (translation and commentary).
- Onésimo Redondo, caudillo de Castilla, Valladolid: Libertad, 1937 (newspaper articles and political speeches)
- El Estado Nacional, Valladolid: Libertad, 1938
- Obras Completas: edición cronológica (2 vols.), Madrid: Publicaciones Españolas, 1954–1955
- Textos políticos. Madrid: Doncel, 1975.

== Bibliography ==
- Payne, Stanley G. (1961). Falange: A History of Spanish Fascism. Stanford: Stanford University Press. ISBN 0804700583.
- Penella, Manuel A. (2006). La Falange teórica (in Spanish). Barcelona: Planeta. ISBN 8408066781.
- Rodríguez Jiménez, José Luis [in Spanish] (2000). Historia de Falange Española de las JONS (in Spanish). Madrid: Alianza Editorial. ISBN 8420667501.
- Valero, Francisco Morente, ed. (2005). Fascismo en España: ensayos sobre los orígenes sociales y culturales del franquismo (in Spanish). Barcelona: Editorial El Viejo Topo. ISBN 8496356329.

== See also ==
- José Antonio Primo de Rivera
- Ramiro Ledesma Ramos
