= Alfaraz de Sayago =

Place in Castile and León, Spain

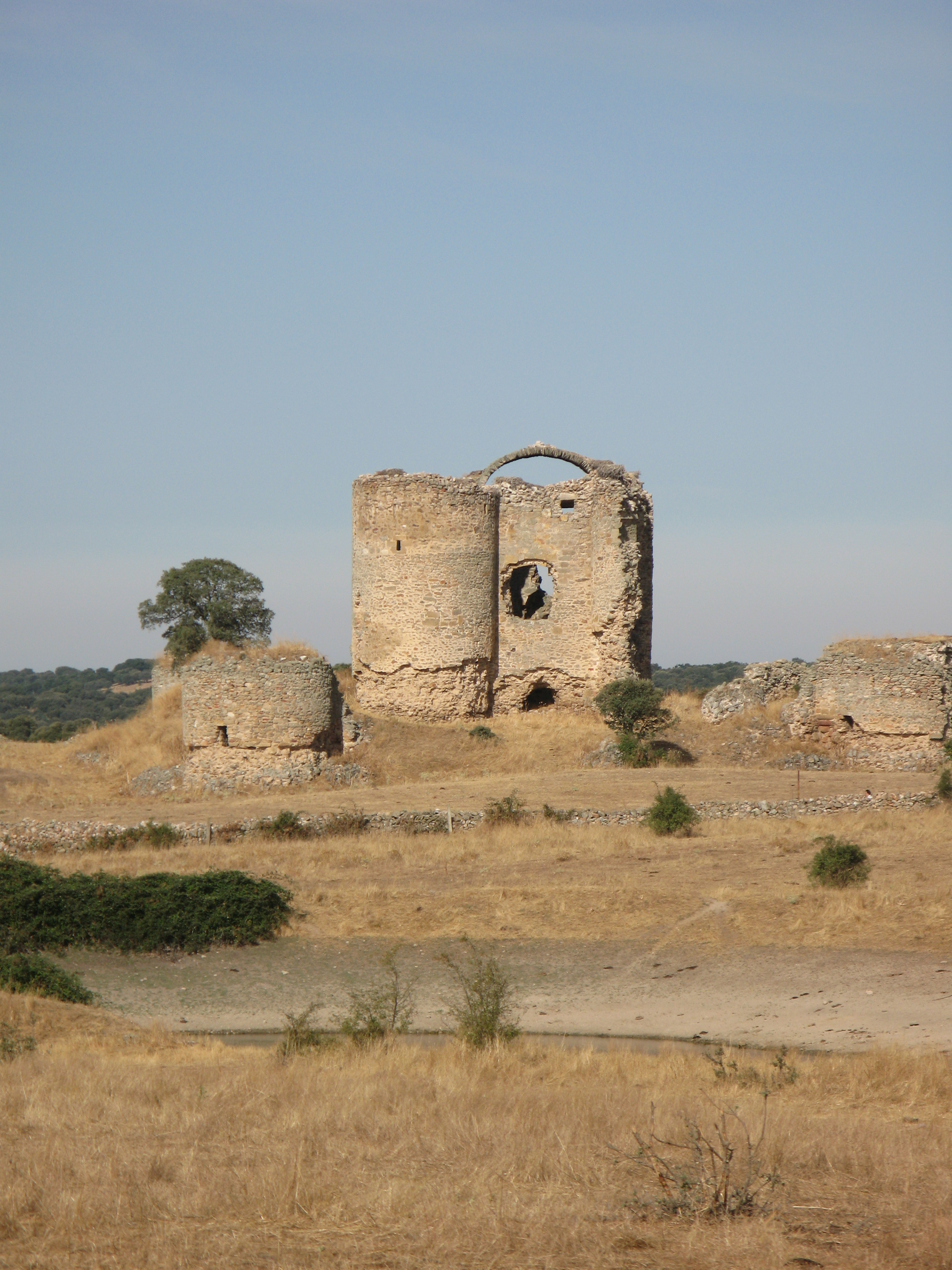
- Castle of Asmesnal

- Location within Spain
- Coordinates: 41°13′N 5°58′W
- Country: Spain
- Autonomous community: Castile and León
- Province: Zamora
- Municipality: Alfaraz de Sayago

Area
  - Total: 73 km^{2} (28 sq mi)

Population (2025-01-01)
  - Total: 120
  - Density: 1.6/km^{2} (4.3/sq mi)
- Time zone: UTC+1 (CET)
  - Summer (DST): UTC+2 (CEST)

Alfaraz de Sayago is a municipality located in the province of Zamora, Castile and León, Spain. According to the 2004 census (INE), the municipality has a population of 194 inhabitants.
