= Propaganda in Spain =

Propaganda in Spain has a long history, and in the modern times has been studied in the context of the propaganda of the Spanish Civil War and propaganda of the Francoist Spain (1939-1975).

== See also ==
- Mottos of Francoist Spain
- Propaganda of the Spanish–American War
