= Ricardo Macías Picavea =

Ricardo Macías Picavea (June 17, 1847 – May 11, 1899) was a writer and reformer.

== Life ==
Ricardo Macías Picavea was born in Santoña, Cantabria, Spain on June 17, 1847. He received a Bachelor of Arts in 1863 in Valladolid. He then went on to study law and philosophy at the Universities of Madrid and Valladolid, but stopped due to disagreements with the universities. In 1874, Macías Picavea became an institute professor in Latin and geography, and received his Ph.D. in 1876. He resided in Valladolid for the rest of his life, and died there on May 11, 1899.

== Works ==
In addition to the works below, Macías Picavea wrote many newspaper articles to support democratic ideals.

- La instrucción pública en España y sus reformas (Public Education in Spain and Its Reform; 1882)
- El problema nacional: hechos, causas y remedios (The National Problem: Events, Causes and Solutions; 1891)
- Tierra de campos (Land of Fields; 1892 novel)
