= Ramiro Ledesma Ramos =

Spanish author (1905–1936)

Ramiro Ledesma
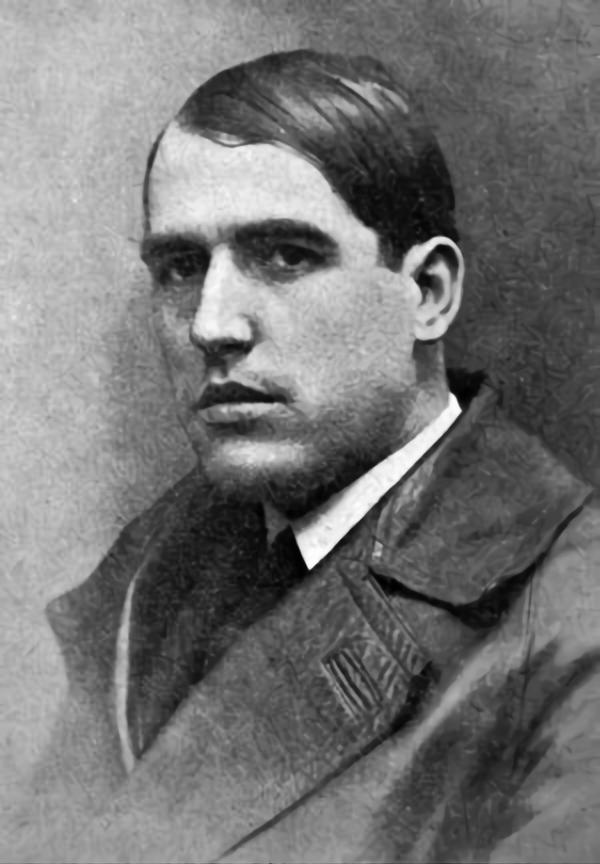

Personal details
- Born: 23 May 1905 Alfaraz de Sayago, Kingdom of Spain
- Died: 29 October 1936 (aged 31) Aravaca, Spain
- Party: JONS (1931–1934); FE de las JONS (1934–1935)
- Profession: Philosopher, politician, writer, essayist, and journalist

Philosophical work
- Era: 20th-century philosophy
- Region: Western philosophy
- Notable works: Discurso a las juventudes de España; ¿Fascismo en España?; Escritos filosóficos; La Conquista del Estado
- Notable ideas: National syndicalism

Ramiro Ledesma Ramos (23 May 1905 – 29 October 1936) was a Spanish philosopher, politician, writer, essayist, journalist, and revolutionary, known as one of the pioneers in the introduction of Fascism and National Syndicalism in Spain.

== Early life ==
Born in Alfaraz de Sayago (province of Zamora), he was raised in Torrefrades, where his father worked as school teacher. After studying Arts and Sciences at the Central University of Madrid, where he was a disciple of José Ortega y Gasset, and contributing to La Gaceta Literaria, El Sol and Revista de Occidente, Ledesma Ramos began studying the works of Martin Heidegger. He also wrote a novel for the youth, entitled El sello de la muerte ("The Seal of Death").

Attracted to both Benito Mussolini's Corporatism, and the developing Nazi movement of Adolf Hitler in Germany, he strove to overcome his "middle class roots," which he saw as an obstacle in reaching out to the revolutionary milieu of Spanish politics in the 1920s. In 1931, Ledesma Ramos began publishing the periodical La Conquista del Estado, named in tribute to Curzio Malaparte's Italian Fascist magazine La Conquista dello Stato—one of the first publications of the Spanish National-Syndicalism. It attempted to bridge the gap between nationalism and the anarcho-syndicalist of the dominant trade union, the Confederación Nacional del Trabajo (CNT), by revising syndicalism altogether.

His admiration for Nazism brought him to imitate Adolf Hitler's hairstyle.

== La Conquista del Estado and the Falange ==
In the very first issue of the La Conquista del Estado (The Conquest of the State), Ledesma published a syncretic program, which promoted statism, a political role for universities, a system of regionalisation, and a syndicalist structure for the national economy. The program's paper was in publication throughout the year, and, although a subject of debate in a CNT assembly, it did not have the intended impact.

He subsequently led his group into an October 1931 merger with Onésimo Redondo's Junta Castellana de Actuación Hispánica, creating the Juntas de Ofensiva Nacional-Sindicalista, and its magazine JONS. The group became the Falange Española de las Juntas de Ofensiva Nacional-Sindicalista (FE-JONS), after it fused with José Antonio Primo de Rivera's group the Falange Española in 1934; he personally designed the movement's badge, the yoke, and the arrows, while he also coined the mottos Arriba España and Una, Grande y Libre, both of which were kept in use in Francoist Spain.

== Death and legacy ==
The group remained stable, despite the fact that Ledesma left over practical and political disagreements with Primo de Rivera. He formed the group La Patria Libre, which, displaying the same favorable attitude to the left-wing trade unions, stood in disagreement with the Falange, predominantly over the idealism it adopted under Primo de Rivera's leadership. Despite Ledesma's disagreements and criticism there is no evidence of personal issues.

The outbreak of the Spanish Civil War caught Ledesma in Republican Madrid, far from the forces of Francisco Franco. Imprisoned by the Popular Front government because of suspected espionage throughout the summer and early autumn of 1936, he was soon executed by the Republican militia.

Ledesma remained a key figure of Francoist propaganda. He was atheist, though he'd issued invitations to the Catholic Church to participate in the task of the "national revolution," Ramiro Ledesma was nonetheless viewed with suspicion by the Roman Catholic Church—which had even threatened to censor his works through the Index Librorum Prohibitorum.

== Quotes ==
- [On himself:] "The red shirt of Garibaldi fits Ramiro Ledesma and his comrades better than the black shirt of Mussolini."

== Works ==
- Discurso a las juventudes de España (Speech to the Youth of Spain)
- ¿Fascismo en España? (Fascism in Spain?)
- La Conquista del Estado (The Conquest of the State)
- Escritos filosóficos, &c. (Philosophical Writings, etc.)

== See also ==
- José Antonio Primo de Rivera
- Onésimo Redondo
- Christian nationalism
