= Juntas de Ofensiva Nacional-Sindicalista =

Councils of National-Syndicalist Offensive Juntas de Ofensiva Nacional-Sindicalista
- Leader: Onésimo Redondo; Ramiro Ledesma Ramos
- Founded: 10 October 1931
- Dissolved: 4 March 1934
- Preceded by: JCAH
- Merged into: Falange Española de las JONS
- Newspaper: Libertad
- Youth wing: Juventudes del Frente Nacional
- Labor wing: Agrarian Trade Union Federation
- Ideology: Fascism; National syndicalism Spanish nationalism
- Political position: Syncretic
- Colours: Black and red
- Slogan: ¡Arriba los valores hispánicos! ¡España Una, Grande y Libre!

Party flag

Juntas de Ofensiva Nacional-Sindicalista (lit. 'Councils of National-Syndicalist Offensive', JONS) was a nationalist and fascist movement in 1930s Spain. In 1934, it merged with the Falange Española into the Falange Española de las JONS.

== History ==
JONS was founded on 10 October 1931 as the fusion of the group around La Conquista del Estado (The Conquest of the State) of Ramiro Ledesma Ramos and the Juntas Castellanas de Actuación Hispánica (Castilian Councils of Hispanic Action) of Onésimo Redondo. JONS, whose leadership was the Central Executive Triumvirate, began as a small organization, primarily amongst students in Madrid as well as workers and peasants in and around Valladolid. Its followers were called jonsistas.

In 1933, JONS experienced a period of expansion and started publishing a theoretical journal, JONS.

Amongst other endeavors, the organisation engaged in trade union work in Castile. In January 1933, Gutiérrez Palma set up a transport-workers union in Valladolid. Later the same year, JONS founded the Agrarian Trade Union Federation. In six months, it had set up 175 trade unions, which together claimed around 3,000 members. During that year, Onésimo Redondo returned from exile in Portugal and restarted the publication Libertad.

JONS expanded throughout the country. Its main strongholds were in Valencia, Granada, Valladolid, and Santiago de Compostela. It also established nuclei in Zaragoza, Bilbao, Salamanca, and Barcelona. The party started publishing Revolución in Zaragoza, Unidad in Galicia, and Patria Sindicalista in Valencia.

== Merger with Falange Española ==
At the national council of JONS, held clandestinely in Madrid on 12–13 February 1934, the organization formulated its intention to merge with the Falange Española of José Antonio Primo de Rivera. The merger formed the Falange Española de las Juntas de Ofensiva Nacional-Sindicalista, or FE-JONS.

During the Spanish Civil War, Francisco Franco forced a further merger with the very different traditional Carlists to create FET y de las JONS, the Falange Española Tradicionalista y de las Juntas de Ofensiva Nacional-Sindicalista or Movimiento Nacional ("National Movement"), henceforth the only legal political party in Francoist Spain. The Movimiento was disbanded upon Spain's transition to democracy in the late 1970s.

== Sources ==
- La Organización Sindical Española. Escuela Sindical 1961. 1961. Madrid. pp. 33–34.
