= Reconcentration policy =

Spanish forced internment policy in Cuba

- Concentration camp
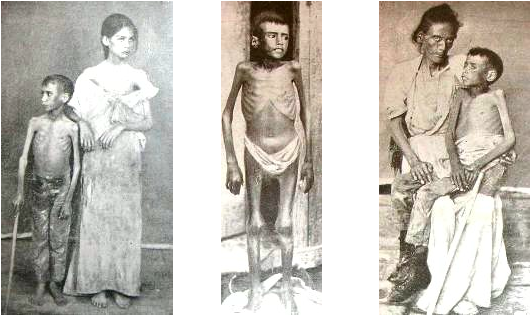
- Victims of the reconcentration policy
- Location: Cuba
- Built by: Valeriano Weyler
- Operated by: Kingdom of Spain
- Original use: Population relocation
- Inmates: Rural Cubans
- Number of inmates: 400,000–500,000
- Killed: 170,000–400,000

The reconcentration policy (Spanish: Reconcentración) was a plan implemented by Spanish military officer Valeriano Weyler in 1896 during the Cuban War of Independence to relocate Cuba's rural population into concentration camps. It was originally developed by Weyler's predecessor, Arsenio Martínez Campos, as a method of separating Cuban rebels from the rural populace who often supplied or sheltered them. Under the policy, rural Cubans had eight days to relocate to concentration camps in fortified towns, and all who failed to do so were to be shot.

The quality of the camps was abysmal, with the housing being in poor condition and the camp rations insufficient and of poor quality; disease also quickly spread through the camps. By 1898, a third of the Cuban population had been moved into camps where at least 170,000 people died due to either disease or a variety of other causes, resulting in the deaths of at least 10% of all Cubans. The Spanish were eventually defeated in the conflict, and as a result, all the camps were shut down.

== Background ==
The plan implemented by Valeriano Weyler to relocate Cuba's rural population into concentration camps was originally developed by Arsenio Martínez Campos as a way to separate rebels from the rural populace who occasionally fed and sheltered them. Affected people had eight days to relocate, and all who failed to obey were to be shot. Housing in camps was often decaying, food was scarce, and disease quickly spread through the camps. By 1898, a third of Cuba's population had been moved into camps and over 400,000 Cubans died due to their subjected conditions. The policy is remembered as the first time in history that modern concentration camps were constructed.

=== Cuban War of Independence ===
Cuban insurgents during the War of Independence against Spain, 1898

Rebel army leaders Máximo Gómez and Antonio Maceo Grajales instituted a strategy of guerrilla warfare in the countryside, often only engaging in hit-and-run attacks and destroying sugar plantations owned by the country's elite. The rebels received significant support from rural peasants and specifically Black plantation workers. A Cuban exile group known as the Cuban Junta had effectively swayed American public opinion onto the side of the rebels. By 1896, the rebels had begun an offensive on the prosperous western end of the island, destroying sugar plantations and causing severe damage to Spain's economy.

=== Spanish administration ===
Governor of Cuba Arsenio Martínez Campos insisted to Spain that the only path to victory included harsher strategies against the rebels. He reckoned it would be necessary to remove the supportive rural population from rebels in order to streamline offensives. Campos personally could not bring himself to order the forced relocation and resigned.

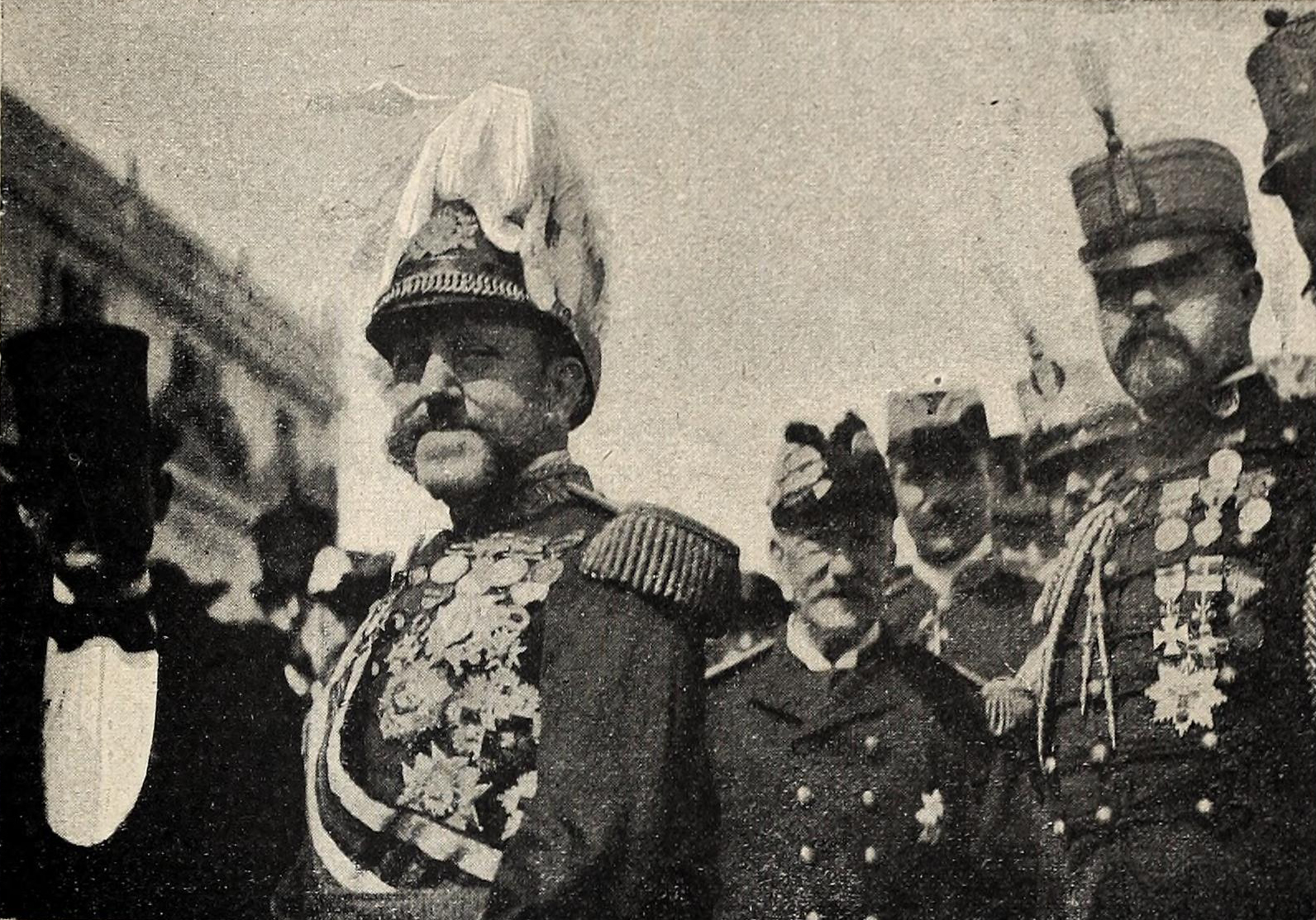
Spanish General Valeriano Weyler upon his arrival in Havana on March 28, 1896.

In 1896, Valeriano Weyler was appointed head of Spanish forces and governor of Cuba. Weyler had previously studied the conflict in Cuba and was a staunch supporter to the idea that the rural population must be relocated for Spain to be victorious.

== History ==
In the autumn of 1896, Weyler decreed that rural Cubans without approved agricultural activities must be moved into camps in fortified towns. All resources and land in the countryside were destroyed so as to not be used by the rebels, livestock was driven into cities, and trade with rural areas was prohibited. By the end of the year, the Cuban countryside was devoid of all common life except for warfare.

Within the camps, disease and starvation began to kill off many of the internees. Despite these horrors, Weyler continued their application.

== Breakdown of the reconcentration policy ==
The collapse of the reconcentration policy was caused by two events: the assassination of Spanish Prime Minister Antonio Cánovas del Castillo by the Italian anarchist Michele Angiolillo and media reports about the tragic situation in Cuba. The Spanish command in late 1897 decided to dismiss General Weyler and give the command to General Ramón Blanco—an opponent of the reconcentration policy. Blanco's administration pledged to send additional rations to Cuba and to assist in the resumption of plantation agriculture. The Spanish government allocated 100,000 US dollars for this purpose. General Blanco finally abolished Weyler's decree of reconcentration in March 1898.

== Bibliography ==
- Annette Becker, «LA GENÈSE DES CAMPS DE CONCENTRATION : CUBA, LA GUERRE DES BOERS, LA GRANDE GUERRE DE 1896 AUX ANNÉES VINGT», Revue d’Histoire de la Shoah, 2008/2 N° 189, pages 101-129, DOI : 10.3917/rhsho.189.0101, on line
- Alvar de La Llosa, «LES TECHNIQUES DE LA RECONCENTRACIÓN DE WEYLER AUX ORIGINES DU SYSTÈME CONCENTRATIONNAIRE COLONIAL ET DE LA RÉPRESSION MASSIVE CONTRE LES CIVILS», Revue d’Histoire de la Shoah, 2008/2 N° 189 | pages 131-176
- Andreas STUCKI, Las Guerras de Cuba. Violencia y campos de concentración (1868-1898), [2013], Madrid, La Esfera de los libros, 2017, 413 p.
- Jonathan Hyslop, "The Invention of the Concentration Camp: Cuba, Southern Africa and the Philippines, 1896–1907", South African Historical Journal, volume=63, number=2, date=2011-06-01,issn=0258-2473, doi=10.1080/02582473.2011.567359|lire en ligne=https://doi.org/10.1080/02582473.2011.567359, pages=251–276.
