= Dionisio Gil =

Cuban general (1852–1899)

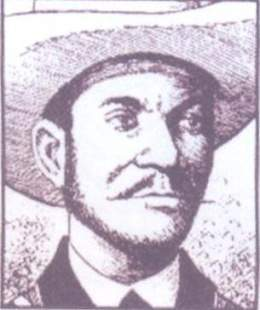

Juan Dionisio "Noni" Gil de la Rosa (December 5, 1852 in Concepción de la Vega, Dominican Republic – December 9, 1899 Cienfuegos, Cuba) was a brigadier general in the Cuban Army of Independence, and fought in the Cuban War of Independence.

== Biography ==
Gil led the Yateras combatants (sympathizers who were indigenous to the land) and formed the "Regimiento Hatuey" to fight against the Spanish, defeating them with machetes, and guerrilla tactics in the forgotten battle of August 31, 1895 dubbed "Sao del Indio". This regiment soon after was one of many other regiments to fight under General Antonio Maceo. Maceo's army of 600 plus men marched to his brother Jose Maceo's rescue in a forty-mile trek through the mountains, and fought the 1,200 Spanish men for thirty six hours. Antonio Maceo ordered then Commander Gil and subsequently the Hatuey Regiment to assault the Spanish armaments, the Spanish were then driven off with a machete storm. In recalling the battle Cuban Colonel Manuel Piedra wrote that he saw the "Dominican General Dionisio Gil flirt with death by prancing on his horse against the enemy lines". The first Dominican to whom a statue has been erected outside their country, and he also has the honor of being the first foreign born person to have a monument in Cuba. Made of bronze, and standing 6 meters high, Gil's statue is in the center of a local park in Cienfuegos, Cuba known as the Panteón de Gil (Pantheon of Gil) sculpted by Jose Villalta Saavedra and inaugurated on May 28, 1911.

Gil was a legitimate son of Dominican hero General Basilio Gil who lost his life while leading the historic uprising, on the night of August 26, 1863 and assaulted the Spanish Garrison in the La Vega Province, Dominican Republic. Dionisio Gil had no known interests in Cuba, and was seen as an "adventurer". He was known as the right-hand man to Antonio Maceo Grajales. Dionisio Gil was assassinated in Cienfuegos, Cuba by the local police, in an attempt of resisting arrest, and his murder was not believed to be politically motivated.
