= Chronology of Colonial Cuba =

The chronology of the colonial time of Cuba is about the Spanish colonial period in Cuba, and the efforts to obtain independence from the Spanish Empire and includes history from the exploration of the island by Christopher Columbus to the Spanish–American War.

== Foundation of the 7 Villas ==
- 1512 – Nuestra Señora de la Asunción de Baracoa
- 1513 – San Salvador de Bayamo
- 1514 – Camagüey
- 1514 – Santísima Trinidad
- 1514 – Sancti Spíritus
- 1515 – San Cristóbal de La Habana
- 1515 – Santiago de Cuba

== Arrival of colonizers ==
The Guanajatabey, Ciboney and Taíno peoples lived in Cuba in the 15th century; these were peaceful peoples and were organized in a primitive community. On October 27, 1492, the first European contact was made when Columbus was trying to sail to the Orient. Sebastián de Ocampo made the first circumnavigation of the island in 1509 and gave the name Carenas to what is now Havana Harbor. In the 1510 expedition of conquistador Diego Velázquez de Cuéllar, the indigenous peoples led by Quisqueyano chief Hatuey resisted the Spaniards but were defeated and captured to be used as cheap manual labor. The colonizers saw the great possibilities of wealth from the continent and the island, which were gradually depopulated.

=== Spanish Colonialism restored in the island ===
In 1560 the island was already a strategically important point for the commercial distribution to the Antilles and Central America. Corona divided the government of the Island between Havana and Santiago de Cuba, the latter being controlled by the powerful Cuenca Family. Between years 1717 and 1727, the royal monopoly of the tobacco was established. This gave rise to several revolts of tobacco growers, resulting in deaths and executions. In 1762, the English took Havana, occupying it for several months before giving it back. Spain exchanged the island for Florida and returned to power over it.

== Arrival of slaves ==
With the depopulation brought about in the indigenous towns, the Spanish began to introduce slaves from Africa. In 1812 a revolt of slaves occurred, led by José Antonio Aponte.

=== Conspiracies against the Spanish regime ===
In 1821 several conspiracies were discovered and their promoters were pursued. One of the most representative among them was the poet José María Heredia. With the absolute power that Fernando VII again imposed in Spain and its dominion, the opposition among the Creoles and Spaniards in Cuba was heightened. This would bring about the 1850 expedition organized by Narciso López to take the city of Cárdenas; it failed, however, and he had to turn back. The Lone Star flag was raised for the first time. Joaquín de Agüero's uprising failed and the leaders were shot on August 12, 1851. Narciso López returned to disembark in Cuba, supporting several battles; he fell into the hands of the Spanish and was executed.

== The Ten Years' War (1868–78) ==
Carlos Manuel de Céspedes gave the Cry of Yara at the sugar mill La Demajagua on October 10, 1868, and, with this, the Great War (or the Ten Years' War) was begun, which ended with the Pact of Zanjón, without Cuban independence or the total abolition with indemnification of the slaves. Among other significant actions, the Protest of Baraguá stands out, in which the pro-independence General Antonio Maceo proclaimed his disagreement with the Pact of Zanjón and his decision to continue fighting.

== Rewarding Truce (1878–95) ==
General Calixto Garcia launched the struggle anew, initiating the Little War, which hardly lasted a year. In successive years, José Martí was exiled to the United States, where he founded the Cuban Revolutionary Party (PRC) and, with Máximo Gómez and Antonio Maceo, started preparations to relaunch the War of Independence. Martí is distinguished as a great politician, writer and poet, and he united the Cuban nationalist forces beyond generations, races and social positions.

== Necessary War (War of Independence) (1895–98) ==
On February 24, the war broke out with the Grito de Baire. Jose Martí died in the combat of Two Rivers, Oriente Province (May 19, 1895), a great loss for the Cuban pro- independence cause. The following year General Antonio Maceo died along with his assistant Francisco Gómez Toro, in the San Pedro estate, province of Havana, on December 7. The Spanish Valeriano Weyler, as Governor General, initiated the Reconcentration Policy, which became like a precursor to the Nazi extermination camps, operated to isolate the rebels from the people and causing devastation in the population. But in spite of the strength and the armament of the Spanish army, the tactics of the Cubans always prevailed and with the invasion from east to west, the process was accelerated that would give them complete independence. But in 1898, the American battleship, USS Maine, was sunk under strange circumstances in the Havana Harbor. This brought about American intervention in the war, which became the Spanish–American War that ended with the Treaty of Paris on December 10, within which Spain ceded Cuba and Puerto Rico to the United States. Thus, a new stage in Cuban history was begun.
