= Battle of Ceja del Negro =

1896 Battle of the Cuban War of Independence

- Part of Cuban War of Independence
- The main cavalry charge during the battle
Date	October 4, 1896
Location	Pinar del Río, Pinar del Río Province, Cuba
Result	Cuban victory

Belligerents
Cuban rebels	Spain

Commanders and leaders
Antonio Maceo; Juan Rius Rivera; Vidal Ducasse	Colonel Granados

Strength
1,000 Mambises	2,000 Infantry

Casualties and losses
Unknown	Around 500

The Battle of Ceja del Negro was a battle of the Cuban War of Independence that took place on October 4, 1896. During the battle, the forces of all three different land armies participated: infantry, cavalry and artillery. The Cuban troops were commanded by Major Generals Antonio Maceo and Juan Rius Rivera, while the Spanish troops were led by Colonel Granados.

== The Battle ==
The Cuban troops were lagging behind as a result of a large number of civilians that they carried with them. The fighting began around eight in the morning and lasts until around five in the afternoon when Maceo's troops are dedicated to harassing the last Spanish strongholds with the most notable stronghold being one known as El Guao, in one of the foothills of the hill known as Ceja del Negro.

The Spanish forces, far superior in number and military power, did not manage to win the battle, but Colonel Granados bombarded the river pass with artillery, where the Cubans were passing, causing large numbers of casualties, especially among the civilian population with the elderly being the most affected.

== Aftermath ==
The victory of General Maceo in Ceja del Negro caused the Captain General of the island, Valeriano Weyler, to hasten his plans for reconcentration against the Cuban civilian population, in order to defeat the pro-independence troops, depriving them of the vital support of the peasants.
