= Duke of Rubí =

Hereditary title of Spanish nobility

- Creation date: 8 July 1920
- Created by: Alfonso XIII
- First holder: Valeriano Weyler y Nicolau
- Present holder: Valeriano Weyler y González Arregui
- Remainder to: Heirs of the body of the grantee
- Status: Extant

Duke of Rubí (Spanish: Ducado de Rubí) is a hereditary title of Spanish nobility, accompanied by the dignity of Grandee. It was created on 8 July 1920 by King Alfonso XIII in favor of Army general Valeriano Weyler, 1st Marquess of Tenerife, chief of staff of the Army.

== Name ==
The dukedom is named after the Rubí's hill (Spanish: Loma del Rubí), in the island of Cuba. In that place, the 1st duke fought the Cuban rebels in 1896, during the Cuban War of Independence.

== Creation ==
On July 8, 1920, the Gaceta de Madrid published the following Royal Decree:

Wishing to offer a distinct demonstration of My Royal appreciation and perpetuate the memory of the important services rendered to the Nation and the Monarchy by Captain General Mr. Valeriano Weyler y Nicoiau, Marquess of Tenerife; in accordance with the advice of My Council of Ministers.
I grant him the title of Duke of Rubí, accompanied by the dignity of Grandee, for himself, his children, and legitimate successors.

— ALFONSO, Royal Decree of 5 July 1920.

== Dukes of Rubí ==
- Valeriano Weyler y Nicolau, 1st Duke of Rubí (1920–1930)
- Fernando Weyler y Santacana, 2nd Duke of Rubí (1930–1931)
- Valeriano Weyler y López de Puga, 3rd Duke of Rubí (1953–1986)
- Valeriano Weyler González, 4th Duke of Rubí (since 1987).

== Line of succession ==
- Valeriano Weyler y Nicolau, 1st Duke of Rubí, 1st Marquess of Tenerife (1838-1930)
  - Fernando Weyler y Santacana, 2nd Duke of Rubí (1877-1931)
    - Valeriano Weyler y López de Puga, 3rd Duke of Rubí (1919-1986)
      - Valeriano Weyler y González Arregui, 4th Duke of Rubí (b. 1957)
