= Rosa Castellanos =

Cuban military nurse (1834–1907)

Rosa Castellanos La Bayamesa
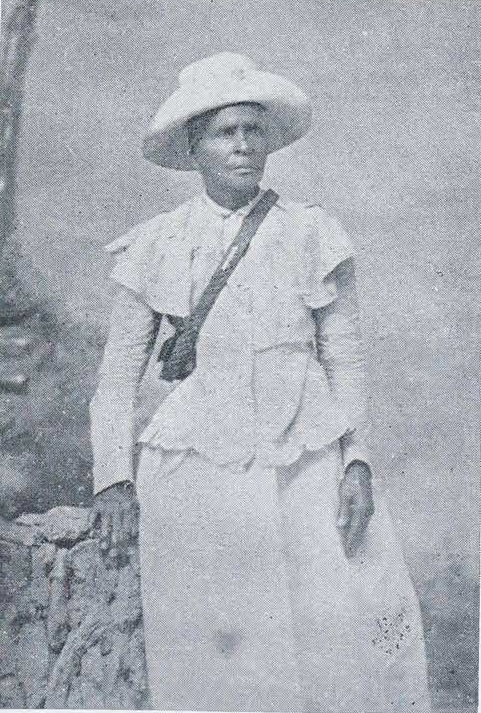
- Castellanos in 1899
- Born: Rosa María Castellanos Castellanos; 1834; Bayamo, Cuba, Spanish Empire
- Died: 25 September 1907 (aged 72–73); Camagüey, Cuba
- Spouse: José Florentino Varona
- Military career
- Allegiance: Cuba
- Service: Cuban Liberation Army
- Service years: 1868–1899
- Rank: Captain
- Known for: Military nursing
- Conflicts: Ten Years' War; Cuban War of Independence

Rosa María Castellanos Castellanos (1834–1907), also known as Rosa la Bayamesa, was Cuban military nurse who founded several hospitals during the Cuban wars of independence.

== Biography ==
Castellanos was born a slave, the daughter of slaves from Africa. When she was released, she and her husband, José Florentino Varona, joined the cause of the Cuban Liberation Army in 1868. She was an early practitioner of nursing in Cuba, well versed in the qualities of medicinal plants. During the Ten Years' War, she assisted the sick and wounded, made clothes and acted as a messenger.

In 1871, she moved to Camagüey, where she founded several military hospitals near the Sierra de Najasa. Major General Máximo Gómez appointed her as a captain of health and entrusted her with the mission of creating a hospital that received the name of "Santa Rosa", in her honor. When the Cuban War of Independence broke out in 1895, she was already 60 years old, but she continued to collaborate with the rebels and Gómez put her back in charge of the hospital he had founded. When there were no wounded to be attended to, she herself fought on the frontline.

After the war, she continued to work as a midwife. She died in Camagüey on 25 September 1907 and her body was publicly laid to rest at the headquarters of the City Council. In 2002, a statue of her was erected at the exit of Bayamo, her hometown, by Alberto Lescay.

== Bibliography ==
- Hidalgo Martínez, Mabiel (25 September 2020). "Sucesos y figuras de la Guerra Necesaria: Rosa Castellanos, La bayamesa". National Library José Martí (in Spanish).
- Oliva Ferrales, Mailenys (24 September 2020). "Aquella "flor" mambisa". Granma (in Spanish).
- Torres Esperón, Julia; Urbina Laza, Omayda (2009). "La Enfermería en la Salud Pública Cubana". Revista Cubana de Salud Pública (in Spanish). 35 (1). ISSN 1561-3127.
