= Monumento El Cacahual =

Coordinates: 22°56′43.422″N 82°23′25.428″W

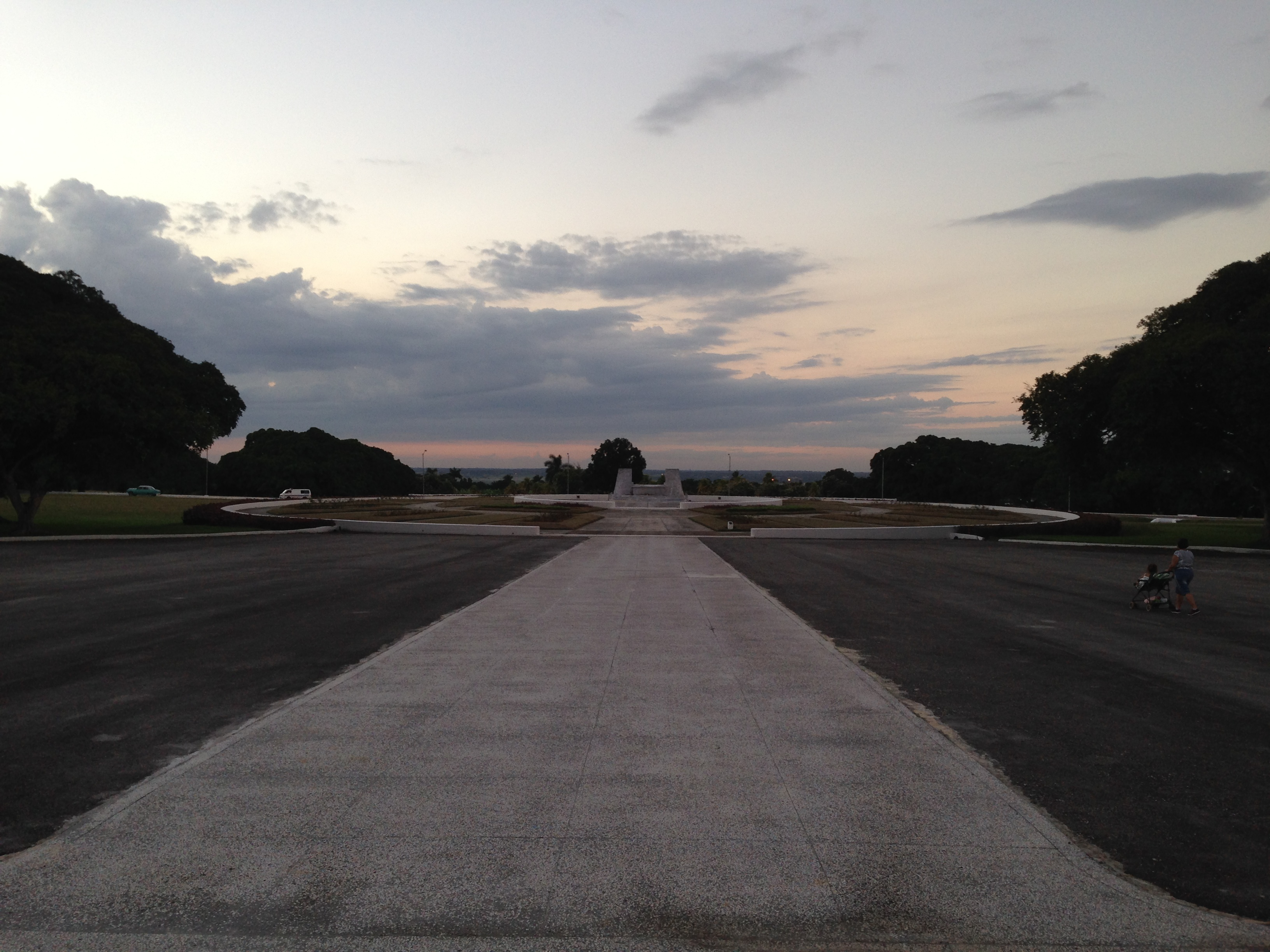
Monumento El Cacahual

The Monumento El Cacahual is a monument located to the south of Santiago de las Vegas, Cuba. It is dedicated to and is the resting place of the remains of Antonio Maceo, second-in-command of the Cuban Liberation Army, and Panchito Gómez Toro, son of General Máximo Gómez. It was granted National Monument status in 1978.
