= Panteón de Gil =

Panteón de Gil (Pantheon of Gil) is a monument in memory of General Dionisio Gil, which was inaugurated on May 28, 1911 in Cienfuegos, Cuba. Born in the Dominican Republic in 1854, Gil died on the corner of Gazel street (35th st), and Hernan Cortes Avenue (66th Avenue) in Cienfuegos, on 28 December 1899.

22°9′0.93″N 80°26′55.82″W
