= United States declaration of war on Spain =

Formal start of the Spanish-American war

Declaration that war exists between the United States and Spain
- Long title: An Act declaring that war exists between the United States of America and the Kingdom of Spain
- Enacted by: the 55th United States Congress
- Effective: April 25, 1898

Citations
- Statutes at Large: 30 Stat. 364

Legislative history
- Introduced in the House on April 13, 1898; Passed the House of Representatives on April 19, 1898 (311–6); Passed the Senate on April 19, 1898 (42-35); Signed into law by President William McKinley on April 25, 1898

On 25 April 1898, the United States Congress declared war upon Spain. The ensuing Spanish–American War resulted in a decisive victory for the United States, and arguably served as a transitional period for both nations. Spain saw its days of empire fade, as the United States saw the prospect of overseas empire emerge. The war was ended by the Treaty of Paris signed on December 10 that same year.

== Background ==
The Spanish–American War originated out of the Cuban War of Independence, launched in February 1895. For decades the United States had watched political developments on Cuba, with which it had extensive economic ties. Historians have long debated America's intentions in becoming involved in the conflict. For a significant period during and after the war, selfless humanitarian interest in the fate of the Cuban people was accepted as the major impetus for the declaration of war. A supporting argument for this line of reasoning is that yellow journalism created an inflammatory mood in the country and swayed public opinion to sympathize with Cuba. Recently this school of thinking has grown less popular. Many historians now believe that the United States was acting more out of its own self-interest, in particular to assist long-term goals of creating an Isthmian canal (eventually realized by the Panama Canal), and pursuing trade with China.

== Events preceding to the declaration ==
On February 15, 1898, an explosion aboard the USS Maine in Havana harbor killed 260 US personnel. Public opinion in the U.S., driven in part by the yellow journalism of William Randolph Hearst and Joseph Pulitzer, blamed Spain, though Spain had no reason for wanting to provoke the U.S. to intervene in Cuba's war for independence, then more than three years old. The U.S. Congress passed legislation allocating an additional $50 million for the military on March 9 and on March 26 President William McKinley demanded that Spain end hostilities by October 1. Spain rejected McKinley's proposal and objected to his interference. McKinley requested authorization from Congress to intervene in Cuba on April 11. Two days later the U.S. Congress by vote of 311 to 6 in the House and 42 to 35 in the Senate passed the Joint Resolution for Cuban independence, which both disavowed any intention of annexing Cuba and authorized the President to use military force to end hostilities between Spain and Cuba. An ultimatum to leave Cuba or face American military intervention was forwarded to Spain on April 20. The Spanish interpreted this ultimatum as declaration of war, even though it technically was not, dismissed the U.S. ambassador, and declared war. On April 22, the U.S. fleet set sail from Key West, Florida, to establish a blockade and prevent the Spanish from delivering supplies to its military forces in Cuba. The U.S. responded by declaring on April 25 that a state of war had existed since the 21st.

== Text of the Declaration ==
The declaration read:

A bill declaring that war exists between the United States of America and the Kingdom of Spain.

Be it enacted by the Senate and House of Representatives of the United States of America in Congress assembled, First. That war be, and the same is hereby, declared to exist, and has existed since the twenty-first day of April, A.D. 1898, including said day, between the United States of America and the Kingdom of Spain.

Second. That the President of the United States be, and he hereby is, directed and empowered to use the entire land and naval forces of the United States and to call into the actual service of the United States the militia of the several States, to such extent as may be necessary to carry this act into effect.

Approved, April 25, 1898.

== See also ==
- Teller Amendment, an amendment to the Declaration of War
