= Ramón Blanco, 1st Marquess of Peña Plata =

19th-century Spanish brigadier and colonial administrator

The Most Excellent The Marquess of Peña Plata
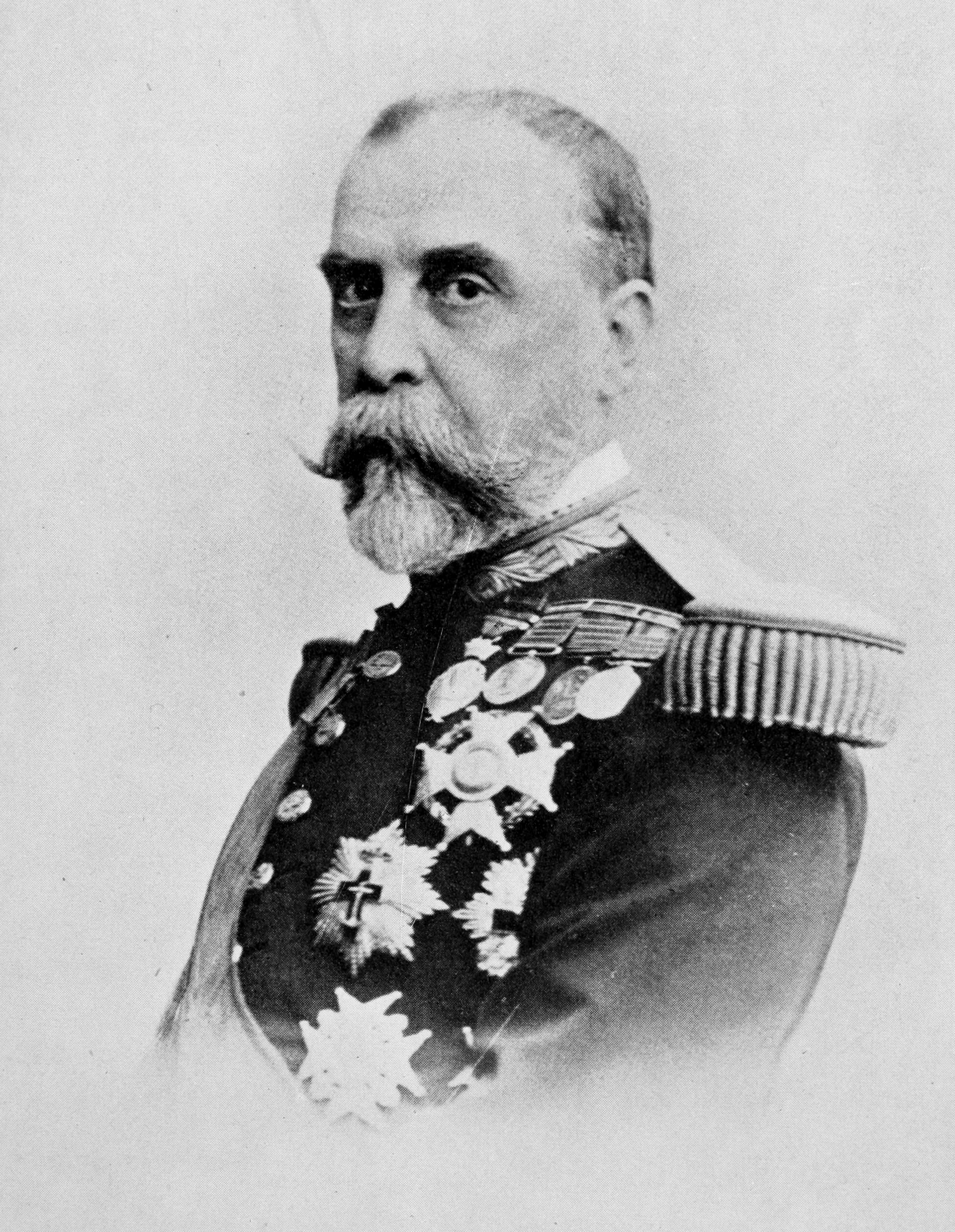

Governor-General of the Philippines
- In office 4 May 1893 – 13 December 1896
- Monarch: Alfonso XIII
- Regent: Maria Christina of Austria
- Prime Minister: Práxedes Mateo Sagasta; Antonio Cánovas del Castillo
- Minister of Overseas: Antonio Maura; Manuel Becerra y Bermúdez; Buenaventura Abarzuza Ferrer; Tomás Castellano Villarroya
- Preceded by: Federico Ochando (as interim)
- Succeeded by: Camilo García de Polavieja (as interim)

Governor of Cuba
- In office 17 April 1879 – 28 November 1881
- Monarch: Alfonso XII
- Prime Minister: Arsenio Martínez-Campos; Antonio Cánovas del Castillo; Práxedes Mateo Sagasta
- Minister of Overseas: Salvador Albacete; José Elduayen Gorriti; Cayetano Sánchez Bustillo; Fernando León y Castillo
- Preceded by: Cayetano Figueroa y Garahondo (as interim)
- Succeeded by: Luis Prendergast y Gordon, Marquis of Victoria de las Tunas
- In office 31 October 1897 – 30 November 1898
- Monarch: Alfonso XIII
- Regent: Maria Christina of Austria
- Prime Minister: Práxedes Mateo Sagasta
- Minister of Overseas: Segismundo Moret; Vicente Romero Girón
- Preceded by: Valeriano Weyler
- Succeeded by: Adolfo Jiménez Castellanos

Personal details
- Born: Ramón Blanco Erenas Riera y Polo; September 15, 1833 San Sebastián, Gipuzkoa, Spain
- Died: April 4, 1906 (aged 72) Madrid, Community of Madrid, Spain

Military service
- Allegiance: Spain
- Branch: Spanish Army
- Years of service: 1858–1906
- Rank: General de brigada
- Battles/wars: Dominican Restoration War; Third Carlist War; Little War; Philippine Revolution; Spanish–American War

Ramón Blanco Erenas Riera y Polo, 1st Marquess of Peña Plata (September 15, 1833 – April 4, 1906) was a Spanish brigadier and colonial administrator. Born in San Sebastián, he was sent to the Caribbean in 1858 and governed Cuba and Santo Domingo. In 1861, he returned to Spain but was then sent to the Philippines (1866–1871).

Afterwards, he returned to Spain and served in the Third Carlist War, where he attained the rank of brigadier. He served as captain-general of Navarre after taking part in the 1876 offensive in the valley of Baztan; he acquired his marquessate during this time. He was sent to Cuba as captain-general in April 1879, and was involved in the Little War. He returned to Spain in November 1881 and served as Captain General of Catalonia and Extremadura.

== Governor-General of the Philippines (1893–1896) ==
In 1893, Antonio Cánovas del Castillo sent him to the Philippines, where Blanco remained until December 13, 1896. Electricity had come to Manila in 1893. In 1895, Blanco announced in the 1895 Philippine Exposition that a great future is predestined for the archipelago. Blanco was forced to deal with the independence movement led by the Katipunan. On the whole, Blanco adopted a conciliatory stance, seeking to improve Spain's image in the face of world opinion. Nevertheless, he placed eight provinces under martial law. These were Manila, Bulacan, Cavite, Pampanga, Tarlac, Laguna, Batangas, and Nueva Ecija. They would later be represented in the eight rays of the sun in the Philippine flag. Arrests and interrogations were intensified and many Filipinos died from torture.

When the revolution broke out, a prominent figure José Rizal was living as a political exile in Dapitan and had just volunteered to serve as a doctor in Cuba, where a similar revolution was taking place. Blanco permitted Rizal, who wished to dissociate himself from the Philippine Revolution, to serve in Cuba to minister to victims of yellow fever. Rizal nevertheless was arrested en route. Blanco could do nothing about it, for he had been forced out of office on December 13. The governor had been attacked by conservative forces (which included the so-called frailocracia—the Dominican friars exercising more power than the civilian government) for being too conciliatory towards the Filipinos who sought independence; these parties had sent a complaint to Madrid. The Battle of Binakayan-Dalahican Blanco suffered his biggest defeat against the revolutionaries led by Santiago Alvarez and Emilio Aguinaldo. Blanco was replaced by Camilo Polavieja (r. 1896–1897) as Governor-General.

Rizal was executed on December 30, an act to which Blanco objected. Blanco later was to present his sash and sword to the Rizal family as an apology.

Blanco had been defended by liberals such as Ramiro de Maeztu, who in an article dated July 24, 1898, declared: "But...Blanco, who in the Philippines, in the face of the opinion of the Junta of Authorities and the most illustrious and noble journalists, kept his troops in the capital for a long time, judging it more preferable to prudently remain in this position rather than die a glorious but pointless death...”

== Captain-General of Cuba (1897–1898) ==
However, Blanco's reputation as a conciliatory figure led the government of Práxedes Mateo Sagasta to send him to Cuba, where he replaced the decidedly inflammatory Valeriano Weyler as Captain General of Cuba. By the end of 1897, Weyler had relocated more than 300,000 Cubans into "reconcentration camps," where he failed to provide for them adequately. Consequently, these areas became cesspools of hunger and disease, where many hundreds of thousands died.

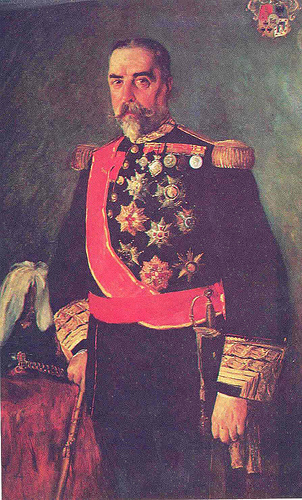
Portrait of Governor-General of the Philippines Ramón Blanco y Erenas by Filipino painter Juan Luna.

Blanco was forced to reverse the harsh policy of Weyler towards the Cubans while at the same time defending the island after the outbreak of the Spanish–American War. After the sinking of the Maine on February 15, 1898, Charles Dwight Sigsbee had written that "many Spanish officers, including representatives of General Blanco, now with us to express sympathy." In a cable, the Spanish Minister of Colonies, Segismundo Moret, had advised Blanco "to gather every fact you can to prove the Maine catastrophe cannot be attributed to us." Blanco proposed a joint Spanish-American investigation of the sinking.

On March 5, 1898, Blanco proposed to Máximo Gómez that the Cuban generalissimo and troops join him and the Spanish army in repelling the United States in the face of the Spanish–American War. Blanco appealed to the shared heritage of the Cubans and Spanish, and promised the island autonomy if the Cubans would help fight the Americans. Blanco had declared: "As Spaniards and Cubans we find ourselves opposed to foreigners of a different race, who are of a grasping nature. ... The supreme moment has come in which we should forget past differences and, with Spaniards and Cubans united for the sake of their own defense, repel the invader. Spain will not forget the noble help of its Cuban sons, and once the foreign enemy is expelled from the island, she will, like an affectionate mother, embrace in her arms a new daughter amongst the nations of the New World, who speaks the same language, practices the same faith, and feels the same noble Spanish blood run through her veins." Gómez refused to adhere to Blanco's plan.

Blanco believed it better to fight than surrender to the Americans. He ordered Pascual Cervera y Topete to break the American blockade, leading to the Battle of Santiago de Cuba.

During Blanco's governorship, the remains of Christoper Columbus were moved back to the Cathedral of Seville in Spain, where they were placed on an elaborate catafalque.

Blanco returned to Spain after the end of the Spanish–American War.

== Honours ==
- Grand Cross of the Military Merit Order, 1874 (Spain)
- Grand Cross of the Order of the Red Eagle, January 4, 1886 (Kingdom of Prussia)

== In popular culture ==
- Portrayed by Allan Perez in the 2012 Filipino film, El Presidente.
- Portrayed by Bon Vibar in the 1998 Filipino film, José Rizal, and the 2014 Filipino film, Bonifacio: Ang Unang Pangulo.
