= Antonio Maceo =

Cuban independence general (1845–1896)

José Antonio Maceo y Grajales
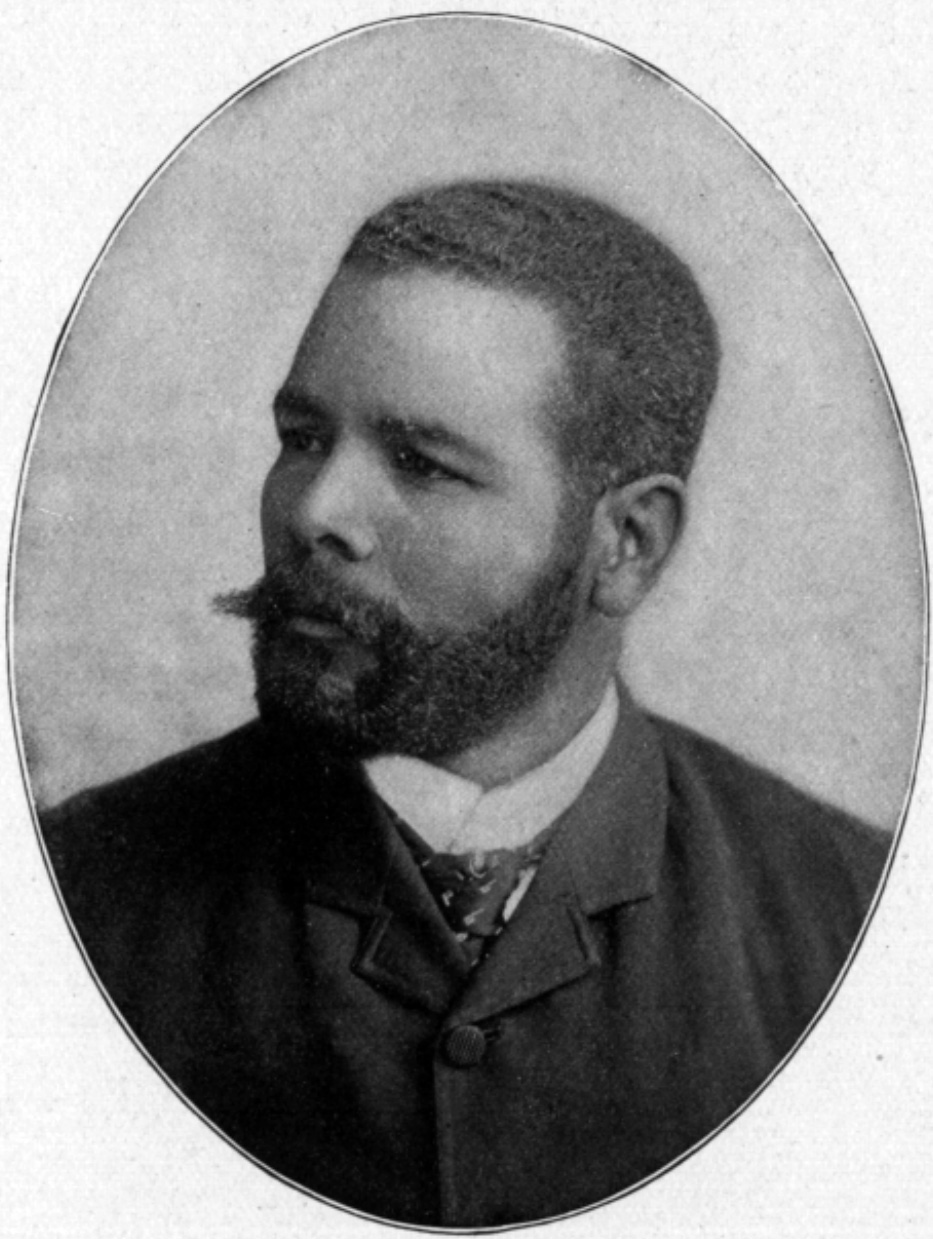
- Antonio Maceo Grajales
- Born: June 14, 1845; Santiago de Cuba, Spanish Cuba
- Died: December 7, 1896 (aged 51); Killed in action at Punta Brava, Cuba
- Burial place: Santa Ifigenia Cemetery
- Spouse: María Cabrales (m. 1866)
- Military career
- Allegiance: Cuba
- Service years: 1868–1896
- Rank: Lieutenant general
- Nicknames: Titan de Bronce; Precursor; Hijo de la Panadera
- Conflicts: Ten Years' War * Battle of Las Guásimas; Cuban War of Independence † * Battle of Ceja del Negro

Lt. General José Antonio de la Caridad Maceo y Grajales (June 14, 1845 – December 7, 1896) was a Cuban general and second-in-command of the Cuban Army of Independence.

Fellow Cubans gave Maceo the nickname "the Bronze Titan" (Spanish: el Titán de Bronce) after he was wounded several times in battle. Spaniards referred to Maceo as the "Greater Lion" (el León Mayor). Maceo was one of the most noteworthy guerrilla leaders in 19th century Latin America, comparable to José Antonio Páez of Venezuela in military acumen.

== Early years ==
Maceo was the son of a Venezuelan farmer and dealer in agricultural products, Marcos Maceo, and a mulatto Cuban woman of Dominican descent, Mariana Grajales y Cuello. His father when still a young man, fought for the Spanish against the forces for independence led by Simón Bolívar, José Antonio Páez and others. In 1823, he moved from Caracas, Venezuela, to Santiago de Cuba after some of his comrades were exiled from South America. Maceo was born June 14, 1845, in the town of San Luis, in the Oriente Province outside Santiago de Cuba, in a farm known to locals as Jobabo. Although his father taught him skills in the use of arms and management of their small properties, it was his mother, Mariana Grajales, who inculcated in him a sense of order. This maternal discipline would be important in the development of Maceo's character and would be reflected later in his acts as a military leader.

At the age of sixteen, Maceo went to work for his father, delivering products and supplies by mule. He was a successful entrepreneur and farmer. As the oldest of the children, he inherited his father's leadership qualities and later would become a decorated general. Maceo developed an active interest in the political issues of his time and was initiated in the mysteries of Freemasonry. The Cuban Freemasonry movement was influenced by the principles of the French Revolution - "Liberty, Equality and Fraternity" - as well as the Masons' main guidelines: God, Reason, Virtue.

== Ten Years' War (1868–1878) ==
Approximately two weeks after the October 10, 1868, revolt led by Carlos Manuel de Céspedes against Spain known as "The Cry of Yara" ("el Grito de Yara"), Maceo, together with his father and brothers joined the war. Mariana Grajales, followed her family members into the manigua (the woods and most thick countryside) in order to support the Mambises, as Cuban rebels were known in the 19th century. The Maceos enlisted as privates when the Ten Years' War began. Within five months, Antonio Maceo was promoted to commander (or major), and within a matter of weeks after that he was again promoted to lieutenant colonel.

A promotion to colonel followed, and five years later he was promoted to the rank of brigadier general because of his bravery and ability to outmaneuver the Spanish Army. Maceo participated in more than 500 battles. However, the humble origin of Maceo and the colour of his skin delayed his raising to the rank of major general, due principally to the racist and class exclusiveness tendencies of several other patriots of an aristocratic or bourgeois origin. Men under Maceo's command began to call him "The Bronze Titan", because of his exceptional physical strength and resistance to bullet or blade injuries. He recovered from more than 25 war injuries over the course of some 500 military battles, and none of Maceo's wounds diminished his willingness to lead his troops into combat.

He had special recognition and admiration, as chief and war teacher, of the great Dominican strategist Máximo Gómez, who would become, in the years to come, the General-in-Chief of the Cuban Liberator Army. The use of the machete as a war weapon by Gómez as a substitute for the Spanish sword (also due to the scarcity of firearms and ammunition) was rapidly adopted by Maceo and his troops.

Antonio Maceo rejected the military seditions of Lagunas de Varona and Santa Rita, which undermined the independence troops' unity and favoured a regionalism in Las Villas. This stood in contrast with the style of leadership exhibited by Vicente García González, who eschewed front line heroics in favor of planning from behind the lines, and who also advocated a regional approach to secession. Divisionism and the imprecise designs of García were plainly rejected by Maceo when the former asked for support to constitute a "New Revolutionary Government".

Divisions, regionalism, and indiscipline were the main reasons for the decline of the Revolution, of which the Spanish General Arsenio Martínez-Campos y Antón, then already named Captain General of Cuba, drew considerable advantage. An officer of honour, he offered peace guarantees, amnesty for revolutionary men and legal reforms, in exchange for a cease of hostilities, which had already lasted 10 years (in 1878). At the same time, the Spanish Government continued the concentration of more forces to enclose the diminishing Cuban rebel forces.

Antonio Maceo was one of the officers who opposed the signing of the Pact of Zanjón, which ended the Ten Years' War. He and other Mambises (independence soldiers) met with General Martínez-Campos on March 15, 1878, to discuss the peace terms, but Maceo argued that no peace could be achieved if none of the objectives of the war had been accomplished; chief among these aims was the abolition of slavery in Cuba and Cuban independence. The only immediate benefit was amnesty for those involved in the conflict and liberty for the black soldiers who had fought in the "Liberator Army". Maceo did not recognize the treaty as valid and did not adhere to the proposed amnesty. This meeting, known as the Protest of Baraguá, began when a messenger was sent to Maceo from another Cuban high-ranking officer, who proposed an ambush against the Spanish general. Maceo rejected the plan, informing the would-be conspirator via letter: "I don't want victory if it goes accompanied with dishonor."

After respecting the truce time for the interview (a few days), Maceo resumed hostilities. In order to save his life, the government of the Republic of Cuba gave him the task of gathering money, arms and men for an expedition from the exterior. Maceo's movements were useless however, due to the dismay of the exiled sympathizers who were unhappy with the Zanjón pact.

Later in 1879, Maceo and Major General Calixto García Íñiguez planned from New York a new invasion to Cuba, which initiated the short-lived Little War. Maceo did not personally fight in these battles, for he had sent Calixto García as highest commander. This avoided exacerbating the racist prejudices of fellow Cuban officers that were inflamed by Spanish propaganda. The Spanish tried to create the impression that Maceo was trying to start a racial war against white Cubans, though their propaganda efforts did little damage to Maceo's reputation.

== The Fruitful Truce (1879–1895) ==
After a short stay in Haiti, where he was pursued by the Spanish and faced assassination attempts by the Spanish consulates, and also in Jamaica, Maceo eventually settled in the Costa Rican province of Guanacaste. The president of Costa Rica assigned Maceo to a military unit and provided him with a small farm to live on. Maceo was contacted by José Martí and urged to initiate the War of 1895, called by Martí the "necessary war".

Maceo, with the experience and wisdom gained from previous revolutionary failures, argued that there were a number of impediments to military success in a brief but intense epistolary exchange with Martí, warning about the causes of the partial defeat in the Ten Years' War (1868–78). Martí responded with his formula of "the army, free; but the country, as a country with all its dignity represented," and convinced Maceo of the high probabilities of success if the war was to be prepared carefully. As a precondition, Maceo demanded that highest command should be in the hands of Gómez, which was approved without reservation by the Delegate of the Cuban Revolutionary Party (Martí). In Costa Rica, he faced, gun in hand, another attempt of assassination by Spanish agents at the exit of a theatre, with fatal result for one of the aggressors.

== Cuban War of Independence ==
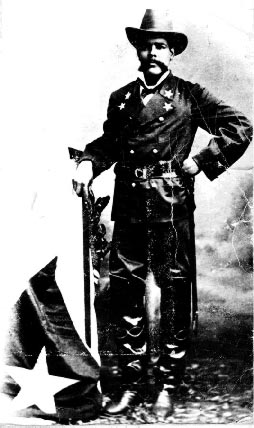
Maceo in uniform

In 1895, together with Flor Crombet and other lesser officers, Maceo disembarked in the vicinity of Baracoa (close to the eastern tip of Cuba) and after repelling a Spanish attempt at capturing or killing him, he got into the mountains of that region. After many difficulties, he managed to gather a small contingent of armed men, which rapidly grew with other rebel groups of the Santiago de Cuba region. In the farm of "La Mejorana", Maceo had a historic, but unfortunate, meeting with Gómez and Martí, because of the disagreements between him and Martí, regarding the question of the relationship between the military movements and the civilian government, against which constitution was Maceo, but Martí, knowing both sides of the problem, stood on his formula. Several days later, Martí, treated as a non-military "Doctor" by Maceo, would fall in battle in Dos Ríos (confluence between the rivers Contramaestre and Cauto).

Cavalry charge by Antonio Maceo against Spanish troops during the Battle of Ceja del Negro on October 4, 1896.

After Gómez was designated General in Chief of the Cuban Liberation Army, Maceo was named Lieutenant General (second in command after the General in Chief). Starting from Mangos de Baraguá (place of the historical protest in front of Martínez-Campos), Maceo and Gómez, on command of two long mambises columns, took brilliantly the task of invading the west of Cuba, riding or walking more than 1000 miles in 96 days. After several months bleeding the Spanish forces in Havana and Pinar del Río Maceo arrived at Mantua, in the western extreme of Cuba, in October 1896, after defeating for many times the technically and numerically superior forces of the Spaniards (five times the Cuban forces on occasions).

Using alternately the tactics of guerrilla and open warfare, they exhausted the Spanish Army of more than a quarter million soldiers and traversed all the island, even through the military trails, walls and fences built by the Spanish Army with the purpose of stopping them and dealing with an overwhelming technical and numerical superiority of the Spaniards. The level of coordination and cohesiveness of Cuban forces was driven by the fact that Máximo Gómez had clearly established a chain of command that subordinated all Major Generals to Maceo, his executive officer.

The invasion of Western Cuba had been previously attempted by Brigadier General Henry Reeve during the Ten Years' War but faltered (and collapsed) between the easternmost section of the province of Matanzas and the westernmost section of the province of Havana and Reeve perished. At the time Maceo had collaborated with Reeve under the direction of Máximo Gómez.

The eagerness for independence and the cruelty of the Spanish high officers made rural inhabitants of the western half of the island eager to give support in men and logistics to the Liberation Army. This was the cause of the institution, by Valeriano Weyler, of the reconcentration. Hundreds of thousands of peasants were forcibly carried to the cities, mainly Havana, Pinar del Río and Matanzas, besides several minor cities in these three provinces. In the concentration camps created for them, very similar to those later built in Europe by the Nazis, almost a third part of the Cuban rural population lost their lives.

Contrary to the expectations of Weyler, the cruel reconcentration encouraged many people to join to the Liberation army, preferring to die in battle than in starvation. In 1896, after meeting Gómez in Havana (crossing once more the trail from Mariel to Majana via Mariel Bay), he returned to the fields of Pinar del Río, where he faced bloody clashes with outnumbering forces, led by Spanish generals famous for their victories in Africa and the Philippines, and provided with artillery and the most modern weapons for infantry including the Mauser bolt-action rifle. After decimating Spanish forces in the westernmost mountains of Cuba, Maceo turned eastward again, crossing the mentioned trail in order to travel to Las Villas or Camagüey. There he was planning to meet Gómez to plan the ulterior course of war, and with the Government in Arms, to establish an agreement between it and the forces in action, in relation with two main subjects: the raisings of medium and high officers in the Liberation Army and the recognition of belligerence by foreign countries and acceptation of direct military aid. His position was, at that time, acquiescent with accepting economic aid and packages with weapons and ammunitions from Europe or even from the United States, but was strongly opposed to acceptance by Cubans in the independence movement for a direct military intervention by the US in Cuba.

== Death ==
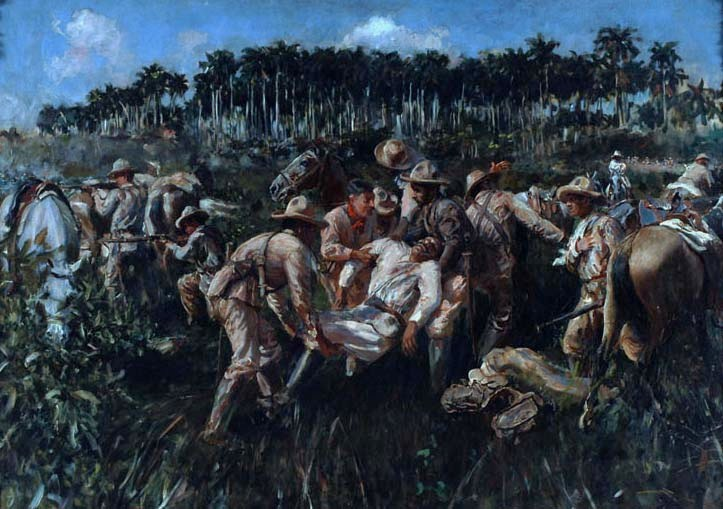
Death of Maceo in 1896

His plans for meeting with Gómez and the Government in Arms never took place. On December 7, 1896, in the vicinity of Punta Brava, Maceo was advancing into the farm of San Pedro, accompanied only by his personal escort (two or three men), the physician of his Headquarters (who sold their position to the Spanish Colonel Francisco Cirugeda), Brigade General José Miró Argenter, and a small troop of no more than twenty men. When they attempted to cut a fence for facilitating the march of horses through those lands, they were detected by a strong Spanish column, which opened an intense fire. Maceo was hit by two shots, one in the chest and another that broke his jaw and penetrated his skull. His companions could not carry him because of the intensity of the firefight and Maceo's size. The only rebel who stayed by him was his aide-de-camp Lieutenant Francisco Gómez Toro (known as Panchito), son of Máximo Gómez, who faced the Spanish column for the sole purpose of protecting the body of his general. After being shot several times, the Spaniards killed Gómez with machete strikes, leaving both bodies abandoned, not knowing the identity of the fallen.

The corpses of Maceo and Panchito were picked up the next day by Colonel Aranguren, from Havana, who ran immediately to the battle scene after hearing the news. They were later buried in secret in the farm of two brothers who swore to keep the burial place in secrecy until Cuba would be free and independent and the correspondent military honors could be given to the hero. Nowadays, the remains of Antonio Maceo y Grajales and Francisco Gómez Toro lie in the Monumento El Cacahual south of Havana, close to the limits of the former farm of San Pedro, and the site is one of pilgrimage by Cuban people. Scholars say that Maceo's death was as traumatic to Cuban patriots as Martí's.

=== Monuments and legacy ===
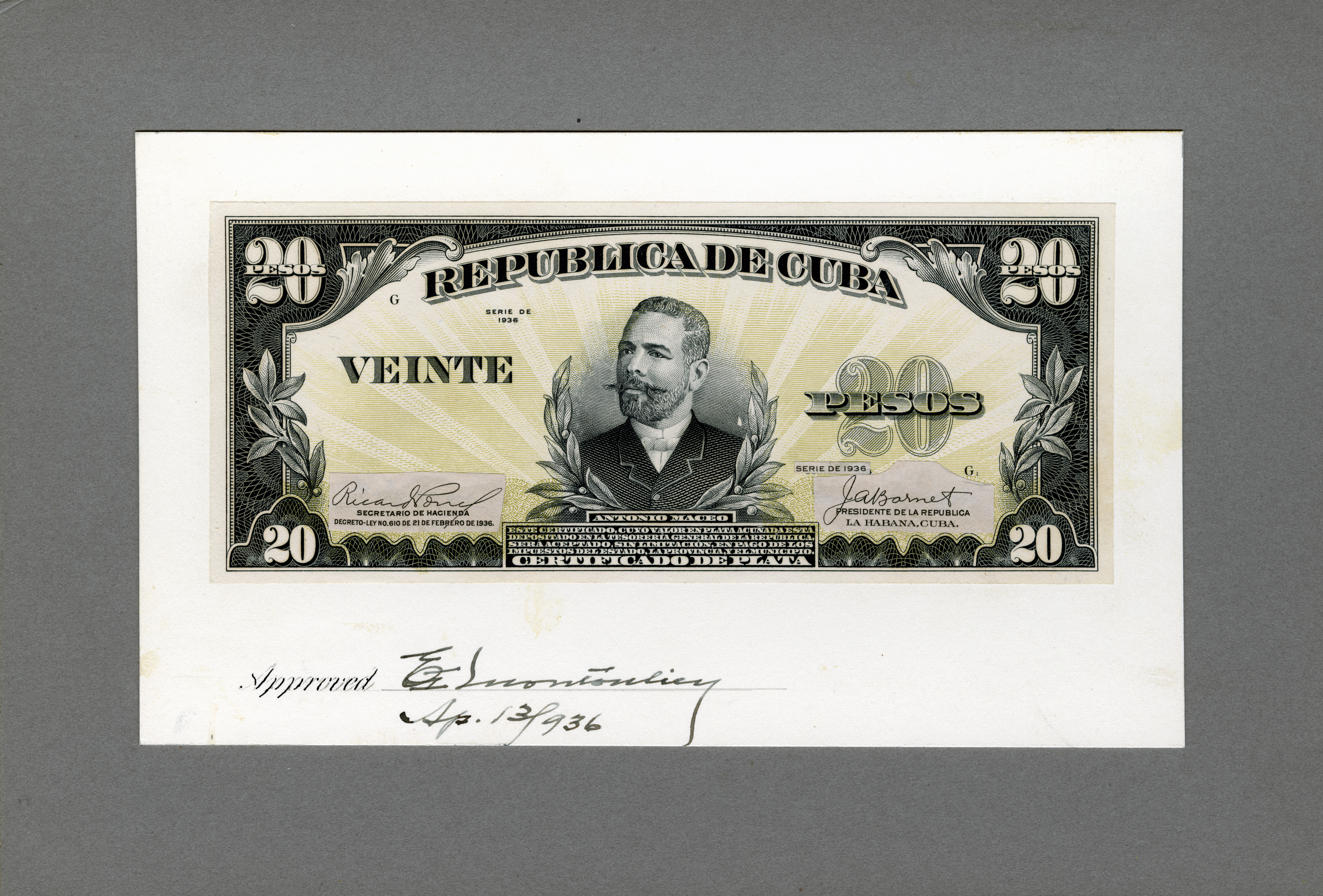
Maceo depicted on the original artist/progress proof designed by the US Bureau of Engraving and Printing for Cuban silver certificates (1936).

Monuments to Maceo include those in Santiago de Cuba and another in Havana, between the Malecón and the front of the Hermanos Ameijeiras Hospital in Centro Habana.

The towns of Maceo, Kentucky and Maceo, Antioquia, Colombia are also named in his honor.

A bust of Maceo can be found in Ellsworth Park in Union City, New Jersey, which has been called Havana on the Hudson.

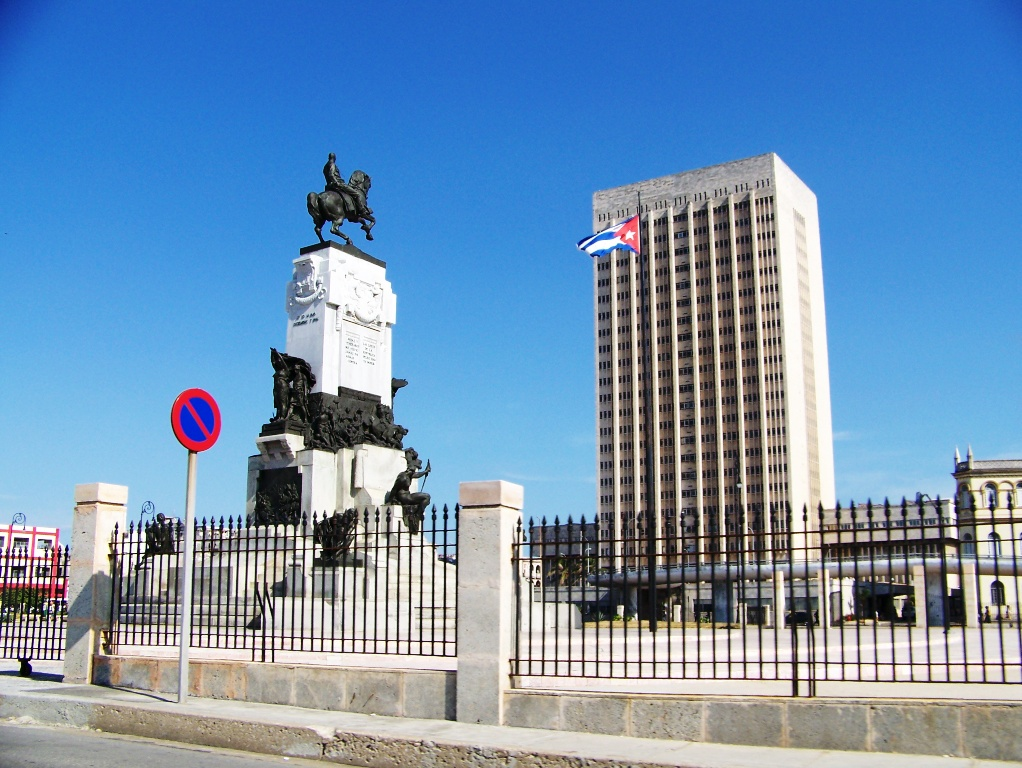
Hermanos Ameijeiras Hospital in Havana, with a monument to Maceo to the left

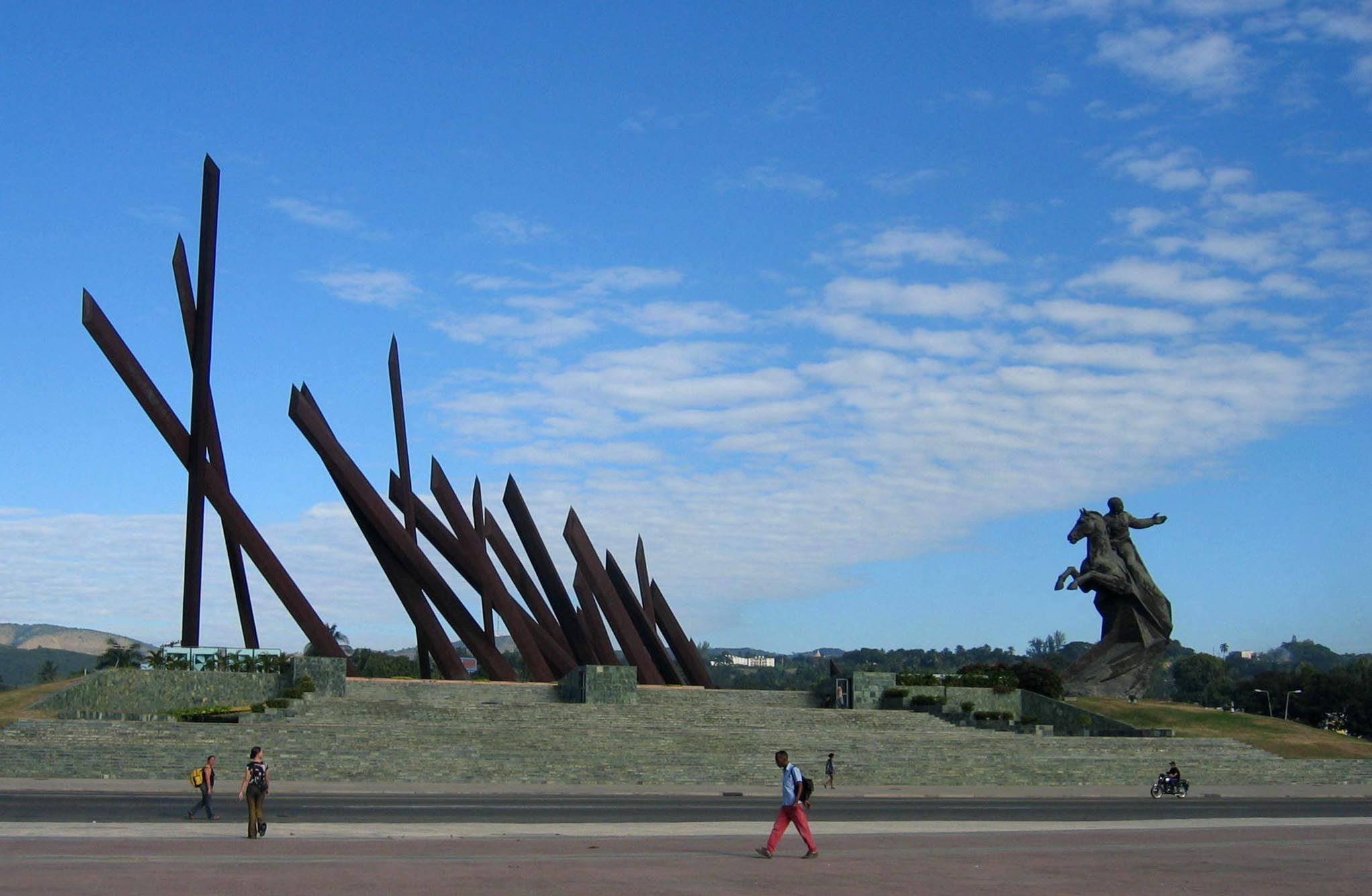
Antonio Maceo Monument in Santiago de Cuba

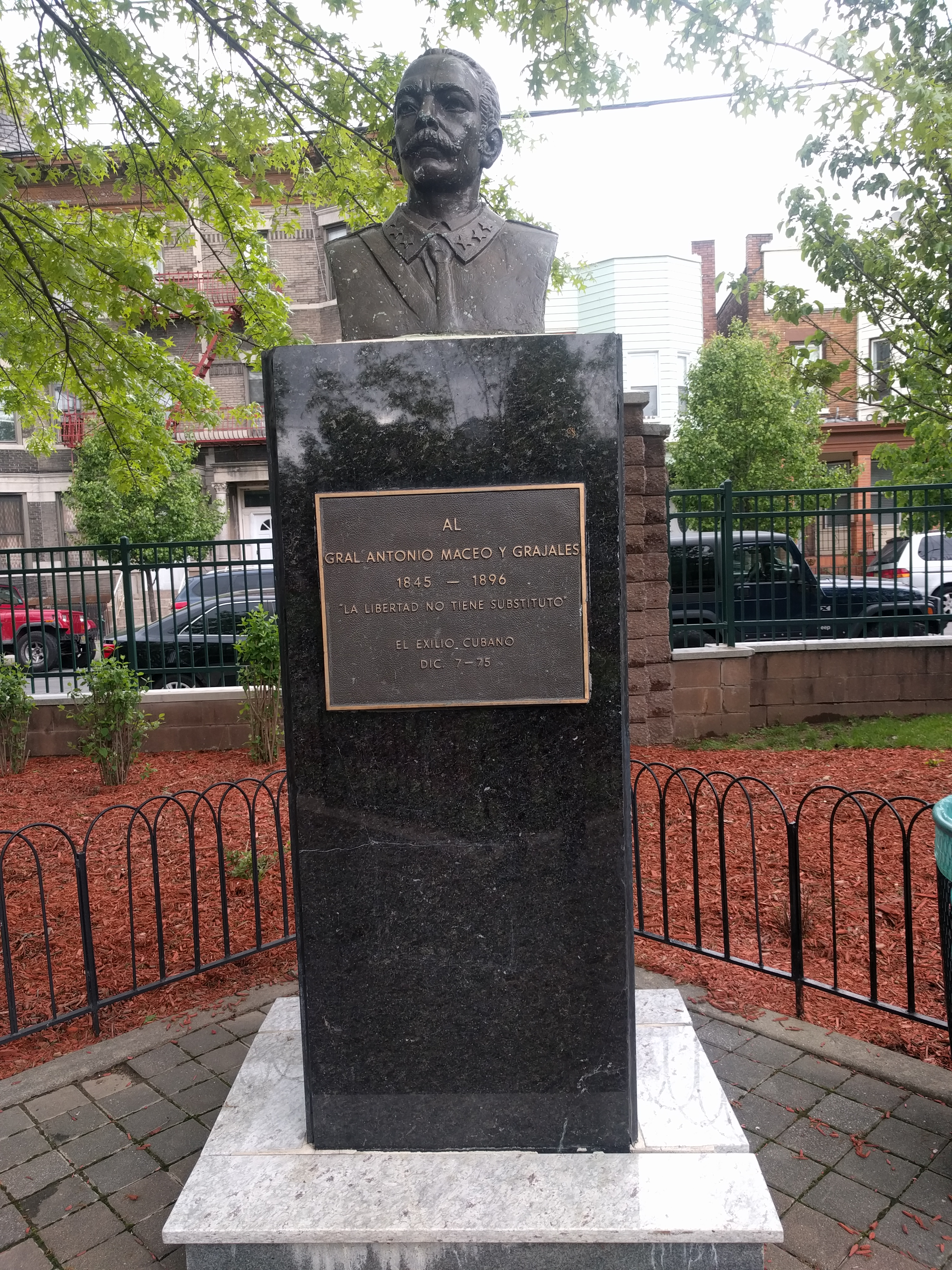
Bust in New Jersey

== See also ==
- Republic of Cuba in Arms
- Cuban Liberation Army
