= Valeriano Weyler =

Spanish Army officer and colonial administrator (1838–1930)

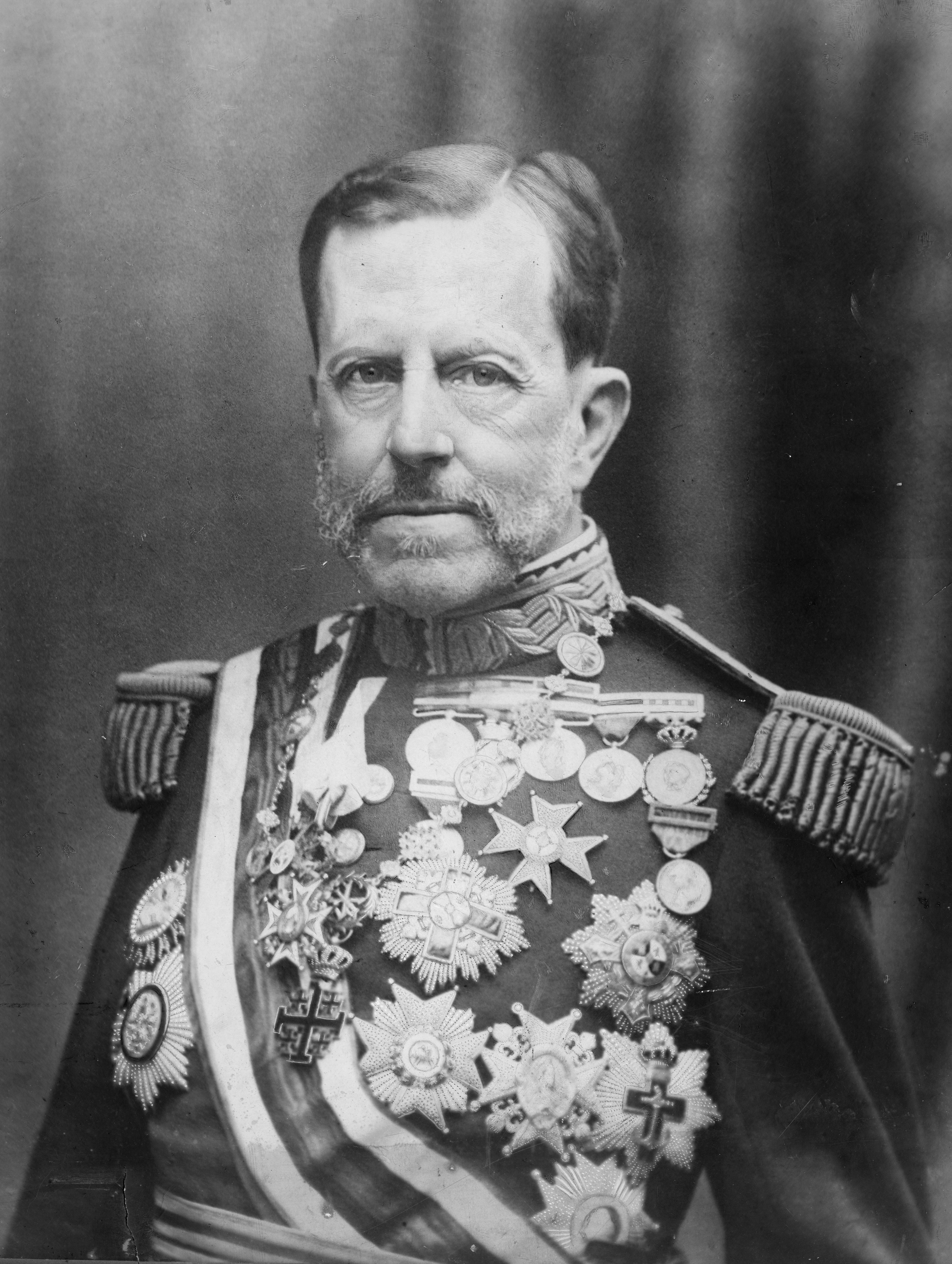

Governor-General of Cuba
- In office 11 February 1896 – 31 October 1897
- Monarch: Alfonso XIII
- Regent: Maria Christina of Austria
- Prime Minister: Antonio Cánovas del Castillo; Marcelo Azcárraga Palmero; Práxedes Mateo Sagasta
- Minister of Overseas: Tomás Castellano y Villarroya; Segismundo Moret
- Preceded by: Sabas Marín y González
- Succeeded by: Ramón Blanco y Erenas

Governor-General of the Philippines
- In office 5 June 1888 – 17 November 1891
- Monarch: Alfonso XIII
- Regent: Maria Christina of Austria
- Prime Minister: Práxedes Mateo Sagasta; Antonio Cánovas del Castillo
- Minister of Overseas: Trinitario Ruiz Capdepón; Manuel Becerra y Bermúdez; Antonio María Fabié
- Preceded by: Emilio Terrero y Perinat
- Succeeded by: Eulogio Despujol y Dusay
Other offices
Minister of War of Spain
In office: 4 December 1906 – 25 January 1907; 1 month and 21 days
Monarch	Alfonso XIII
Prime Minister	Antonio Aguilar y Correa
Preceded by	Agustín de Luque y Coca
Succeeded by	Francisco Loño y Pérez
In office: 23 June – 1 December 1905; 5 months and 8 days
Monarch	Alfonso XIII
Prime Minister	Práxedes Mateo Sagasta
Preceded by	Vicente Martitegui
Succeeded by	Agustín de Luque y Coca
In office: 6 March 1901 – 6 December 1902; 1 year and 9 months
Monarch	Alfonso XIII
Prime Minister	Eugenio Montero Ríos
Preceded by	Arsenio Linares y Pombo
Succeeded by	Arsenio Linares y Pombo
Minister of the Navy of Spain
In office: 31 October – 1 December 1905; 1 month and 1 day
Monarch	Alfonso XIII
Prime Minister	Eugenio Montero Ríos
Preceded by	Miguel Villanueva y Gómez
Succeeded by	Víctor María Concas
Chief of Staff of the Army of Spain
In office: 14 January 1916 – 5 January 1922; 5 years, 11 months and 22 days
Monarch	Alfonso XIII
Prime Minister	Count of Romanones; Manuel García Prieto; Eduardo Dato; Antonio Maura; Joaquín Sánchez de Toca; Manuel Allendesalazar
Minister of War	Agustín de Luque y Coca; Francisco Aguilera y Egea; Fernando Primo de Rivera; José Marina Vega; Juan de la Cierva y Peñafiel; Dámaso Berenguer; Diego Múñoz Cobos; Luis de Santiago y Aguirrevengoa; Antonio Tovar y Marcoleta; José Villalba Riquelme; Luis de Marichalar y Monreal
Preceded by	Julián González Parrado
Succeeded by	Luis Aizpuru y Mondéjar
In office: 28 July 1923 – 6 October 1925; 2 years, 2 months and 8 days
Monarch	Alfonso XIII
Prime Minister	Manuel García Prieto; Miguel Primo de Rivera
Minister of War	Luis Bermúdez de Castro; Juan O'Donnell
Preceded by	Luis Aizpuru y Mondéjar
Succeeded by	Manuel Goded Llopis

Personal details
- Born: Valeriano Weyler y Nicolau; 17 September 1838 Palma de Mallorca, Balearic Islands, Spain
- Died: 20 October 1930 (aged 92) Madrid, Spain
- Party: Liberal Party

Military service
- Allegiance: Spain
- Branch: Spanish Army
- Rank: Captain General
- Commands: 6th Army Corps
- Wars: Dominican Restoration War; Ten Years' War; Third Carlist War; Cuban War of Independence; Spanish–American War

Captain General Valeriano Weyler y Nicolau, 1st Duke of Rubí, 1st Marquess of Tenerife (17 September 1838 – 20 October 1930) was a Spanish Army officer and colonial administrator who served as the Governor-General of the Philippines and the Governor-General of Cuba, and later as the Minister for War. He is infamous for the brutality with which he executed his assignment to suppress an 1897 rebellion in Cuba through a policy of mass-reconcentration, which is estimated to have killed between 170,000 and 400,000 Cubans. These policies influenced the United States towards declaring war on Spain.

== Early life and career ==
Weyler was born in 1838 in Palma de Mallorca, Spain. His distant paternal ancestors were originally Prussians and served in the Spanish army for several generations. He was educated in his place of birth and in Granada. Weyler decided to enter the Spanish army, being influenced by his father, a military doctor.

He graduated from the Infantry School of Toledo at the age of 16. At 20, Weyler had achieved the rank of lieutenant, and he was appointed the rank of captain in 1861. In 1863, he was transferred to Cuba, and his participation in the campaign of Santo Domingo earned him the Laureate Cross of Saint Ferdinand. During the 1860s, he served as a Spanish attaché in Washington, D.C. during the American Civil War. During the Ten Years' War that was fought between 1868 and 1878, he served as a colonel under General Arsenio Martínez Campos, but he returned to Spain before the end of the war to fight against Carlists in the Third Carlist War in 1873. In 1878, he was made general.

== Canary Islands and the Philippines ==
From 1878 to 1883, Weyler served as Captain-General of the Canary Islands. In 1888, Weyler was made Governor-General of the Philippines. Weyler granted the petitions of 20 young women of Malolos, Bulacan, to receive education and to have a night school. The women became known as the Women of Malolos. The original petition was denied by the parish priest of Malolos, who argued that women should always stay at home and take care of the family.

Weyler happened to visit Malolos afterward and granted the petition on account of the persistence the women displayed for their petition. José Rizal wrote a letter to the women, upon request by Marcelo H. del Pilar, praising their initiative and sensibility on their high hopes for women's education and progress. In 1895, he earned the Grand Cross of Maria Christina for his command of troops in the Philippines in which he fought an uprising of Tagalogs and conducted an offensive against the Moros in Mindanao.

== Spain ==
On his return to Spain in 1892, he was appointed to command the 6th Army Corps in the Basque Provinces and Navarre, where he soon quelled agitations. He was then made captain-general at Barcelona, where he remained until January 1896. In Catalonia, with a state of siege, he made himself the terror of the anarchists and communists.

== Cuba ==
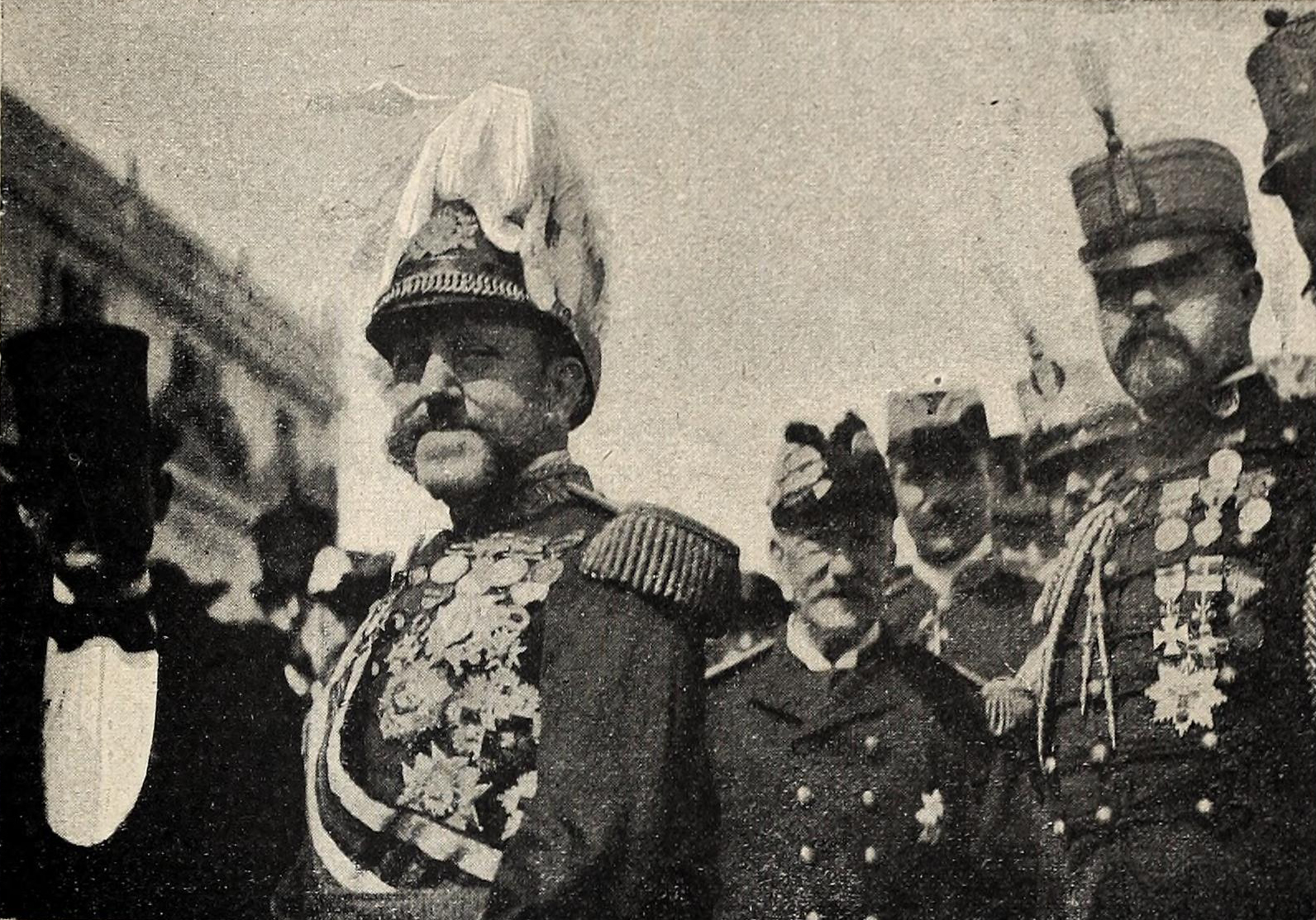
Spanish General Valeriano Weyler upon his arrival in Havana on March 28, 1896.

After Arsenio Martínez Campos proved unable to defeat the Cuban Liberation Army, the government of Antonio Cánovas del Castillo sent Weyler to Cuba to replace him in 1896. This decision met the approval of the Spanish public, who perceived Weyler as the right man to suppress the rebellion in Cuba. Weyler was made Governor-General of Cuba and was granted full powers to suppress the rebellion and restore Spanish rule alongside Cuba's sugar industry. Initially, he faced the same challenges as his predecessor. While Spanish troops were trained in conventional warfare tactics and required substantial supplies to operate, their Cuban opponents engaged in hit-and-run tactics, lived off the land and blended in with the general population to avoid detection.

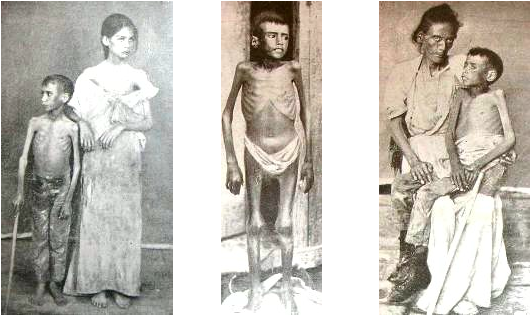
Victims of Weyler's reconcentration policy

Weyler responded by implementing the reconcentration policy, which was intended to separate the rebels from the civilian Cuban population by confining the latter to concentration camps guarded by Spanish troops. Under the policy, rural Cubans had eight days to relocate to concentration camps in fortified towns, and all who failed to do so were to be shot. The camp housing was in poor condition and the camp rations were insufficient and poor quality; disease also quickly spread through the camps.

The reconcentration policy weakened the rebel position but resulted in the deaths of between 170,000 and 400,000 Cubans, was used by the US, the UK and other maritime powers in their Black Legend propaganda against Spain, particularly in the United States, the press labeled Weyler as "The Butcher". This wave of American anti-Spanish sentiment was used to legitimize the United States declaration of war on Spain in 1898 and their expansionism in the Atlantic and the Pacific. Cánovas's government supported Weyler's tactics, but the Liberal Party denounced them for their toll on the Cuban people. The term "reconcentration" is thought to have given rise to the term "concentration camp". Academic Andrea Pitzer considered Weyler's camps to be the world's first concentration camps. Weyler's strategy was successful only in completely alienating the Cuban population from the Spanish as well as galvanizing international opinion against Spain. After Cánovas was assassinated on 8 August 1897 by Michele Angiolillo Lombardi and a new Liberal Party government led by Práxedes Mateo Sagasta took over, Weyler was recalled from Cuba and replaced by the more conciliatory Ramón Blanco, 1st Marquess of Peña Plata.

== Return to Spain ==
He served as Minister of War three separate times (1901–1902, 1905, 1906–1907) and as Chief of Staff of the Army in two separate terms (1916–1922, 1923–1925).

After his return to Spain, Weyler's reputation as a strong and ambitious soldier made him one of those who, in case of any constitutional disturbance, might be expected to play an important role, and his political position was nationally affected by this consideration; his appointment in 1900 as captain-general of Madrid resulted indeed in great success in the defense of the constitutional order. He was minister of war for a short time at the end of 1901, and again in 1905. At the end of October 1909, he was appointed captain-general at Barcelona, where the disturbances connected with the execution of Francisco Ferrer were quelled by him without bloodshed.

Valeriano Weyler, the Marquess of Tenerife, was made Duke of Rubí and Grandee of Spain by royal decree in 1920.

He was charged and imprisoned for opposing the military dictator Miguel Primo de Rivera in the 1920s. He died in Madrid on 20 October 1930. He was buried the next day in a simple casket without a state ceremony, as he requested.

== Sources ==
- Navarro García, L. (1998). "1898, la incierta victoria de Cuba". Anuario de Estudios Americanos. 55 (1). University of Sevilla: 165–187. doi:10.3989/aeamer.1998.v55.i1.370.

Spanish nobility
New creation	Duke of Rubí; 1920–1930	Succeeded by Fernando Weyler
