= Ángel del Castillo Agramonte =

Cuban revolutionary (1834–1869)

Ángel del Castillo
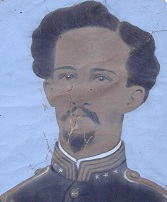
- Born: Ángel del Castillo y Agramonte; August 14, 1834; Puerto Principe, Captaincy General of Cuba, Spanish Empire
- Died: September 8, 1869 (aged 35); Ciego de Ávila, Ciego de Ávila Province, Captaincy General of Cuba, Spanish Empire
- Military career
- Allegiance: Cuba
- Branch: Cuban Liberation Army
- Service years: 1868–1869
- Rank: General
- Conflicts: Ten Years' War; Las Clavellinas Uprising; Battle of Bonilla; Battle of Las Minas

Ángel del Castillo y Agramonte (August 14, 1834 – September 8, 1869) was a Cuban revolutionary and military general who was killed during the Ten Years' War in Cuba.

== Early life ==
Ángel del Castillo y Agramonte was born in Puerto Príncipe (now Camagüey), Spanish Cuba on August 14, 1834. As a member of a distinguished family, he was a wealthy planter on the Cuban island.

After finishing his dentistry studies in the United States in the mid-1850s, he returned to Cuba.

== Ten Years' War ==
After the revolutionary Cry of Yara and uprising led by Cespedes on October 10, 1868, Castillo and many other figures of Camagüey injected themselves into the Ten Years' War.

=== Las Clavellinas Uprising ===
Castillo was involved in the Las Clavellinas Uprising during Camagüey's armed revolt in November 1868. As coordinated by Cisneros Betancourt, the trusted allies of Eduardo Agramonte Piña were summoned to meet in the early hours of the morning. 76 Cuban patriots met at the Las Clavellinas river, three miles from Camagüey, and organized for battle on November 4, 1868. Ángel del Castillo, Jerónimo Boza Agramonte, Adolfo Varona y de la Pera, and Salvador Cisneros Betancourt, among others assembled at the stream. Castillo and his brother freed their slaves to join the fight. While Jerónimo Boza Agramonte assumed command as the superior chief, Col. Agramonte Piña divided the Cuban insurgents into several platoons.

=== Battle of Bonilla ===
During the Battle of Bonilla in Minas on November 28, 1868, insurgent forces commanded by Ángel del Castillo and Bernabé Varona routed a Spanish regiment led by Blas Villate, who retreated to Nuevitas. Shortly after, he engaged in another skirmish with Villate, Count of Valmaseda.

After Céspedes assumed the presidency in April 1869, Castillo was named colonel of the 2nd Brigade, under Maj. Gen. Ignacio Agramonte's Camagüey division in Manuel de Quesada's Cuban Liberation Army.

=== Battle of Las Minas ===
Ángel del Castillo participated in the Battle of Las Minas in May 1869, where he and Manuel de Quesada gathered over 4,000 troops and established a stronghold beyond Las Minas. Gen. Juan de Lesca launched an assault, leading to Salvador Cisneros Betancourt coming to their aid, and they successfully repelled the attack.

== Death ==
Ángel del Castillo died on September 8, 1869, while assaulting Fort Lázaro López in Ciego de Ávila, Ciego de Ávila Province.
