= Las Clavellinas Uprising =

1868 battle of the Ten Years' War

- Part of Ten Years' War
| Date | November 4, 1868 |
| Location | Las Clavellinas, Camagüey, Camagüey Province, Captaincy General of Cuba |
| Result | Cuban victory |

Belligerents
| Cuban rebels | Spain |

Commanders and leaders
| Gen. Jerónimo Boza Agramonte; Col. Eduardo Agramonte Piña; Lt. Manuel Boza; Lt. Ignacio Mora; Lt. Martín Loynaz; Lt. José Recio Betancourt; Lt. Francisco Arteaga Piña; Lt. Manuel Agramonte Porro | Unknown |

Strength
| 70+ mambises | Unknown |

The Las Clavellinas Uprising was a military engagement of the Ten Years' War. It took place on November 4, 1868, at the Las Clavellinas estate, near Puerto Príncipe (now Camagüey) in Cuba. It was the initial armed uprising in the Camagüey Province against the Spanish colonial government.

== History ==
Tínima Masonic Lodge No. 16 in Puerto Príncipe, which included distinguished individuals like Salvador Cisneros Betancourt and Ignacio Agramonte, began to engage in revolutionary activities. In the summer of 1868, Carlos Manuel de Céspedes conducted revolutionary meetings among various revolutionary groups that had been developing within the Cuban province's masonic lodges.

Following the Cry of Yara led by Carlos Manuel de Céspedes in Eastern Cuba in October 1868, the conspirators in Camagüey, Central Cuba, backed the insurrection. Organized by Salvador Cisneros Betancourt to counter the Spanish consolidation in Eastern Cuba, Gen. Jerónimo Boza Agramonte assumed command while Col. Eduardo Agramonte Piña mobilized the insurgents.

== The Battle ==
With the prevailing circumstances conveyed by Salvador Cisneros Betancourt, the Camagüeyans swiftly launched the uprising. Eduardo Agramonte Piña summoned his trusted allies to gather at 7:00 AM the following morning. Around 76 patriots determined to launch into the fight, on November 4, 1868, met on the banks of the Las Clavellinas river, three miles from Puerto Príncipe (now Camagüey), along Nuevitas–Camagüey Road.

From Las Clavellinas, they marched to the El Cercado sugar mill, setting up camp to arrange and stockpile weapons, horses, and equipment. The men were organized into a small but efficient force of several platoons under the command of Jerónimo Boza Agramonte. His lieutenants were appointed to lead the seven groups into which the insurgent forces were divided including Ignacio Mora, Manuel Boza Agramonte, Martín Loynaz, José Recio Betancourt, Eduardo Agramonte, Francisco Arteaga Piña, and Manuel Agramonte Porro.

A force led by Napoleón Arango and Augusto Arango forced a Spanish garrison, consisting of a lieutenant and 30 cavalrymen, to surrender on November 4, 1868, at San Miguel de Bagá near Nuevitas. The capture of the town of Guáimaro occurred by November 6, 1868.

== Aftermath ==
Blas Villate, a General of the Spanish Army, landed in Vertientes on November 17, 1868, under the direction of Captain General Francisco de Lersundi y Hormaechea, to pacify the rebellion, and reached Puerto Príncipe on the 19th. On November 18, a meeting was held by the Camagüeyans at Las Clavellinas to address the arrest order issued against them, followed by another meeting at Las Minas on November 26, 1868. The Cuban insurgents engaged with Villate on November 28, 1868, at the Battle of Bonilla in Minas, Cuba.
