= Battle of Bonilla =

1868 battle of the Ten Years' War

- Part of Ten Years' War
Date	November 28, 1868
Location	Minas, Camagüey, Camagüey Province, Captaincy General of Cuba
Result	Cuban victory

Belligerents
Cuban rebels	Spain

Commanders and leaders
Gen. Augusto Arango; Gen. Ignacio Agramonte; Col. Ángel del Castillo	Gen. Blas Villate, Count of Valmaseda

Strength
150 mambises	Unknown

Casualties and losses
Unknown	10 killed, 32 wounded

The Battle of Bonilla was a military engagement of the Ten Years' War. It took place on November 28, 1868, at Minas, in Puerto Príncipe (now Camagüey Province) in Cuba. After the Las Clavellinas Uprising in the province, the Spanish colonial government sent experienced military officers to quell the rebellion.

== History ==
Following the Las Clavellinas Uprising on November 4th, Ignacio Agramonte, a lawyer from Puerto Príncipe, joined the Cuban patriots in the region on November 10, 1868. Spanish General Blas Villate, Count of Valmaseda, landed in Vertientes on November 17, 1868, as directed from Havana by Captain General Francisco de Lersundi y Hormaechea. On November 18th, a meeting was held by the Camagüeyans at Las Clavellinas to address the arrest order issued against them. Despite the Cuban attempts to impede the Spanish forces movement from Vertientes to Puerto Príncipe, Villate reached the town on the 19th. Another meeting of Cuban leaders took place at Minas on November 26, 1868, to discuss revolutionary matters. The Revolutionary Committee of Camagüey was formed at this time by Salvador Cisneros Betancourt, Eduardo Agramonte Piña, and Ignacio Agramonte. Gen. Augusto Arango was assigned as the head of the Camagüey forces, with his military actions remaining under the control of the committee that held civilian authority.

Unable to pacify Puerto Príncipe and lacking enough forces for an overland push to Bayamo, Blas Villate, Count of Valmaseda proceeded along the Puerto Príncipe to Nuevitas railway on November 25, 1868. He planned to cross by sea to Havana to discuss matters with Lersundi.

== The Battle ==
On November 28, 1868, at Bonilla, a point on the Nuevitas-Camagüey railway line, the Cubans awaited the passage of the Spanish commander who was traveling from Camagüey to Nuevitas. Among the Cuban leaders were Augusto Arango, Ignacio Agramonte, and Ángel del Castillo. Arango, directing the insurgent forces, entrenched his men, and prepared for Villate's advancing column. In his first major battle, Ignacio Agramonte was assigned the most advanced and risky position among the 150 men.

Nearby the hills of Bonilla, Arango's 150 Cuban troops were notified that the Spanish vanguard had advanced to the Tomás Pío Betancourt Bridge on the railway line. The Cuban commandant Augusto Arango and his men clashed with the San Quintín regiment of Blas Villate, Count of Valmaseda. Although he commanded a strong contingent, the Count of Valmaseda was delayed by the Camagüeyans for several hours and had to alter his route. Villate, who reported ten killed and thirty-two injured, was compelled to order the Spanish troop's retreat to San Miguel de Bagá near Nuevitas.

== Aftermath ==
The action at Bonilla greatly influenced the progression of the war. In San Miguel de Bagá, Blas Villate awaited reinforcements. With his forces strengthened, Villate's column moved towards Eastern Cuba to recover Bayamo, facing continuous harassment from the mambises of Camagüey.
