= Augusto Arango =

Cuban army general (1830–1869)

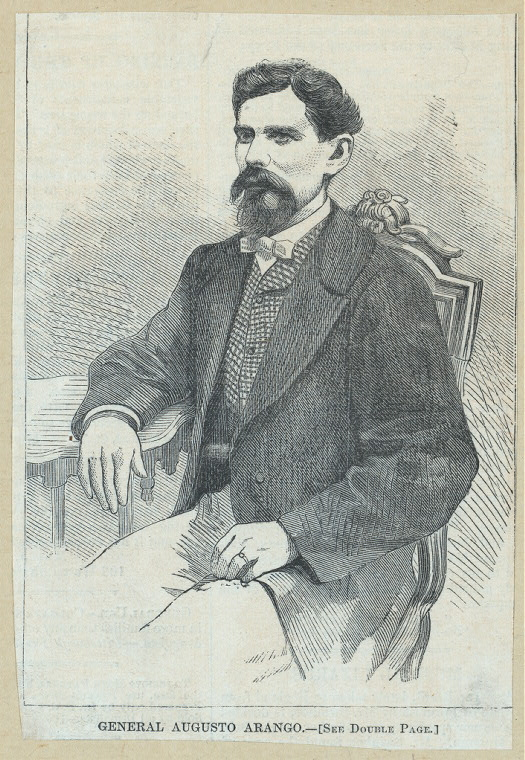
- Born: Augusto Arango y Agüero; March 18, 1830; Puerto Príncipe, Captaincy General of Cuba, Spanish Empire
- Died: January 26, 1869 (aged 38); Puerto Príncipe, Captaincy General of Cuba, Spanish Empire
- Burial place: General Cemetery of Camagüey
- Relatives: Napoleón Arango
- Military career
- Allegiance: Cuba
- Branch: Cuban Liberation Army
- Rank: General
- Commands: Camagüey Province
- Conflicts: Ten Years' War; Las Clavellinas Uprising; Battle of Bonilla

Augusto Arango (March 18, 1830 – January 26, 1869) was a Cuban revolutionary and mambí General who was assassinated by Spanish authorities in Cuba during the Ten Years' War.

== Early life ==
Augusto Arango y Agüero was born in Puerto Príncipe (now Camagüey Province), Spanish Cuba on March 18, 1830.

He was a physician who dedicated much of his time to revolutionary activities. He participated in the independence uprising led by his relative, Joaquín de Agüero, on July 4, 1851, in Camagüey.

He relocated and lived in Greenwich Village in New York in the 1860s.

In 1866, he joined, along with many other notable Camagüeyans including Salvador Cisneros Betancourt, Ignacio Agramonte, and Bernabé Varona, the "Tínima" Masonic lodge. As early as July 1868, the Masonic Order of Tínima deliberated on revolutionary activities in the Cuban province. Carlos Manuel de Céspedes coordinated various Revolutionary committees and groups to convene for an insurrection. In August 1868, the conspirators, including Arango, first assembled at San Miguel del Rompe, a Las Tunas farm property in Oriente.

== Ten Years' War ==
After Céspedes' October 1868 declaration, Arango became involved in the Ten Years' War, the first major Cuban campaign against Spanish rule.

=== Las Clavellinas Uprising ===
In the course of the Las Clavellinas Uprising, he led a squad with his brother Napoleón Arango that successfully captured a Spanish garrison at San Miguel de Bagá. This garrison, which included a lieutenant and 30 cavalrymen, surrendered to Augusto and Napoleón's forces on November 4, 1868.

On November 26, 1868, the Revolutionary Committee of Camagüey was created with Salvador Cisneros Betancourt, Eduardo Agramonte, and Ignacio Agramonte among its members. The committee's first action was to ensure military power was subordinate to civilian authority. It briefly functioned as the provincial government, directing military activities under Arango. Arango, who held the title of general, led the mambises in the province. His brother, Napoleón, was expelled from the military ranks for his attempts to interfere with the central department's efforts through counter-revolutionary actions.

=== Battle of Bonilla ===
At the Battle of Bonilla on November 28, 1868, the commandant and his men clashed with the San Quintin regiment of Blas Villate, Count of Valmaseda. The Spanish troops were forced to retreat to San Miguel de Bagá near Nuevitas. He commanded the Camagüeyan forces of the Cuban Liberation Army from November to December 1868, until he was succeeded by Manuel de Quesada, a veteran of the Reform War.

In January 1869, Céspedes tasked the military officer with negotiating with the Spanish to explore possible terms for an agreement. Although Arango favored negotiations, he encountered resistance from the Revolutionary Committee of Camagüey. Arango unadvisedly arrived alone and unarmed at the gates of Puerto Príncipe. Despite holding a safe-conduct, he was murdered by Spanish Volunteers before entering the town to arrange a meeting with Gen. Dulce. According to reports, his body was located with a decree of amnesty that detailed his pardon and the conditions of the compromise. Céspedes broke off any negotiations and declined to enter into further communication with the Spanish authorities.

== Death ==
Augusto Arango died in Puerto Príncipe, Cuba on January 26, 1869.
