= Manuel de Quesada y Loynaz =

Cuban army general (1833-1884)

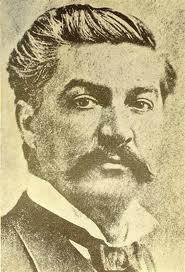
- Born: Manuel de Quesada y Loynaz; March 29, 1833; Puerto Príncipe, Captaincy General of Cuba, Spanish Empire
- Died: January 29, 1884 (aged 50); San Jose, Costa Rica
- Military career
- Allegiance: Cuba
- Branch: Mexican Army; Cuban Liberation Army
- Rank: Major General
- Conflicts: Second Franco-Mexican War; Battle of Fortín; Battle of Puebla; Ten Years' War; Battle of the Sierra de Cubitas; Battle of Las Minas; Battle of Las Tunas

Manuel de Quesada y Loynaz (March 29, 1833 - January 29, 1884) was a Cuban revolutionary and the first General-in-Chief of the Cuban Liberation Army who fought against Spain in the Ten Years' War.

== Early life ==
Manuel de Quesada y Loynaz was born in Puerto Príncipe (now Camagüey Province), Spanish Cuba on March 29, 1833. He was part of a distinguished Cuban family, with parents Pedro Manuel de Quesada and Carmen Loynaz y Miranda. His sister Ana de Quesada y Loynaz would later marry Carlos Manuel de Céspedes.

== Mexican Army ==
=== Reform War ===
In the mid-1850s, he left Cuba and relocated to Mexico. Quesada joined the Army of Mexico as a second lieutenant in 1856. During the Reform War from 1857 to 1861, he fought on the side of the Mexican liberals and Benito Juárez. Amid a three-year civil war and the eventual defeat of the Mexican conservatives, he was promoted to the rank of colonel. The Cuban fought under Juárez as Chief of the Armed Forces in 1860.

=== Second Franco-Mexican War ===
Emperor Napoleon dispatched French troops to Mexico in 1861 due to Mexico's unpaid debts to European countries, leading to the Second French intervention in Mexico. Quesada took charge of the initial confrontation against the French invaders at Rinconada in Veracruz in 1862. Despite being outnumbered and under-equipped, Quesada and the Mexican forces under Ignacio Zaragoza and Porfirio Díaz defeated a French force at the Battle of Puebla on May 5, 1862. The victory is commemorated by Cinco De Mayo. Quesada achieved distinction and was promoted to the rank of divisional general.

Juárez's government was eventually ousted from the Mexican capital by the French invasion, which established the monarchy of Archduke Maximilian, Emperor of Mexico. Quesada provided protection for President Juárez during the government's evacuation to San Luis Potosí in 1863. He was later entrusted with high-ranking roles, acting as the Military Governor of Tlaxcala, Coahuila, and Durango.

Once he and his brother Rafael de Quesada left the service, they became involved in the Cuban fight for independence. In 1865, General Quesada relocated to New York.

== Ten Years' War ==
In the summer of 1868, Quesada and Cuban patriot Pablo Perez were covertly in Camagüey to help coordinate an insurrection and address any shortages in military supplies. When the conditions for an uprising had not materialized, he returned to the United States. He then traveled to Nassau as an agent of the Cuban Republic until news of the Cry of Yara and uprising.

At the outbreak of the Ten Years' War in October 1868, he organized an expedition with men, arms, and ammunition to aid the insurrection. On December 27, 1868, the first expedition on the schooner Galvanic landed at La Guanaja beach with 83 men, and an armament composed of thousands of weapons and ammunition. La Verdad published that $31,000 was collected for the expedition. Soon after, the Revolutionary Committee of Camagüey appointed him to the position of General-in-Chief of the Camagüeyan forces, replacing Augusto Arango.

The guerrilla warfare campaign led by Gen. Manuel de Quesada secured important towns in the interior region between Nuevitas and Puerto Príncipe.

On February 18, 1869, Gen. Juan de Lesca's Spanish expedition landed at La Guanaja beach with four steamers and 3,600 troops, heading for Puerto Príncipe. By March 1869, the Cuban forces under Quesada ambushed Lesca in the Battle of the Sierra de Cubitas. It was an attempt to prevent Brig. Gen. Lesca's advance into Puerto Príncipe to the capital.

=== Cuban Liberation Army ===
On April 12, 1869, the Guáimaro Constitution was drafted and the first Cuban government was established in Guáimaro of Camagüey Province. Upon its establishment, the House of Representatives took on the responsibility of delegating positions. When Carlos Manuel de Céspedes was sworn in as its first president, Manuel de Quesada was appointed by the Guáimaro Assembly as the first General-in-chief of the Cuban Liberation Army, with Gen. Thomas Jordan as his chief of staff.

The division's first battalion was composed of 320 foot soldiers and 80 cavalrymen. Quesada was described as wearing a black or grey suit, a white shirt, a Cuban cockade with 'V.C.L.' initials in gold and a sword with an eagle-shaped gold hilt. His staff wore red flannel shirts, patent leather boots, Panama hats, and cockades bearing silver 'V.C.L.' initials. The General-in-Chief's personal escort was led by Bernabé Varona, which consisted of 300 cavalrymen. The uniform of his escort included blue flannel shirts, white or black pants, and Panama hats.

=== Battle of Las Minas ===
In May 1869, Quesada fought in the Battle of Las Minas, where he and Ángel del Castillo gathered over 4,000 troops and established a fortified position beyond Las Minas. Gen. Lesca launched an attack on their stronghold, prompting Salvador Cisneros Betancourt to come to their aid. The Cubans, wielding machetes and cane-knives, charged the Spanish forces and drove them from the field.

On June 6, 1869, Quesada's forces intercepted a convoy bound for Las Tunas, defeating 600 Spanish troops and capturing four wagons filled with provisions, ammunition, and important papers.

=== Battle of Las Tunas ===
On August 16, 1869, Quesada commanded the mambises in the first Battle of Las Tunas, clashing with forces under the command of Col. José Vincente de Valera.

Upon learning of the brutal conduct of the Spaniards, Gen. Quesada wrote to Spanish Gen. Lesca to seek a mutual agreement on the treatment of prisoners of war. Lesca's reply indicated no intention to change Spanish practices, leaving the Cubans no alternative but to adopt similar measures. Consequently, in October 1869, Quesada informed the Cuban Congress and ordered the execution of 67 prisoners who had voluntarily joined the Cuban army but were found to be part of a treacherous conspiracy to betray the Cubans.

After a series of other military actions, on December 17, 1869, Quesada was relieved of command by the House of Representatives because of his dictatorial approach to military leadership. Quesada who had chief control of military affairs was succeeded by Gen. Thomas Jordan and Maj. Gen. Ignacio Agramonte.

=== Foreign Mission ===
In January 1870, Quesada was assigned to the United States to head the foreign mission abroad as a special agent of the Cuban Republic. Gen. Quesada engaged with different Cuban associations, clubs, and gatherings in the United States, which were held to secure financial and other support for the war. He gathered extensive war materials, organized filibustering expeditions, and dispatched men, ammunition, and paper currency for the Republic in Arms. He also began publishing a pamphlet titled the Informe Oficial.

=== The Virginius ===
In April 1870, Gen. Quesada arrived in Washington, DC to explore additional methods of securing assistance from the United States. Quesada, with the aid and financial resources provided by the Cuban Junta, acquired the Virgin, a former Confederate blockade runner, and renamed it to Virginius. In September 1870, the steamer was registered in New York under the name of American James F. Patterson on Quesada's behalf.

A court-martial in Havana on November 7, 1870, found Quesada and others tied to the Cuban Junta guilty of treason and rebellion, ordering their death by garrote if they were caught by Spanish forces.

In the middle of January 1873, the Edgar Stuart expedition, organized by Quesada alongside Gen. William A.C. Ryan, was dispatched with Col. Aguera in command. Later, in July 1873, another of Quesada's expeditions successfully landed from Aspinwall.

==== The Virginius Affair ====
In October 1873, the ill-fated Virginius Affair marked the final expedition of the steamship acquired and deployed by Quesada. It led to the capture and execution of the crew and some of the passengers by Spanish authorities. Following this, Quesada addressed the U.S. President Ulysses S. Grant in the Address of Cuba to the United States published by Comes, Lawrence & Co. in New York on December 4, 1873.

Following the Pact of Zanjón, he relocated to Costa Rica in 1879.

== Death ==
Manuel de Quesada died in San Jose, Costa Rica on January 29, 1884. He was buried in the Cementerio General de San José in Costa Rica.

In 1925, his nephew and the 6th President of Cuba Carlos Manuel de Céspedes y Quesada wrote a book titled Manuel de Quesada y Loynaz.
