= Jerónimo Boza Agramonte =

Cuban revolutionary (1824–1871)

Jerónimo Boza
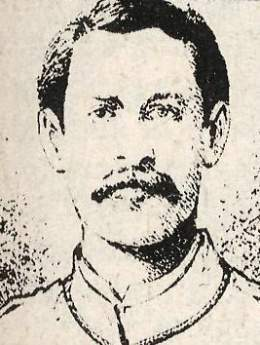
- Born: Jerónimo Boza y Agramonte; 1824; Puerto Principe, Captaincy General of Cuba, Spanish Empire
- Died: 1871 (aged 46–47); Captaincy General of Cuba, Spanish Empire
- Military career
- Allegiance: Cuba
- Branch: Cuban Liberation Army
- Service years: 1868–1871
- Rank: Colonel
- Conflicts: Ten Years' War †; Las Clavellinas Uprising; Battle of Bonilla

Jerónimo Boza Agramonte (1824–1871) was a Cuban revolutionary and military officer who was killed during the Ten Years' War in Cuba.

== Early life ==
Jerónimo Boza Agramonte was born in Puerto Príncipe (now Camagüey), Spanish Cuba in 1824. He was named after his grandfather Jerónimo Boza y Zayas-Bazán.

== Ten Years' War ==
Following Carlos Manuel de Cespedes' Cry of Yara on October 10, 1868, in Eastern Cuba, Boza Agramonte and the Camagüeyans of Central Cuba soon entered the war of independence against Spain.

=== Las Clavellinas Uprising ===
He played an important role in the Las Clavellinas Uprising when Camagüey rose up in arms in November 1868.

As coordinated by Salvador Cisneros Betancourt, Jerónimo Boza Agramonte assumed command as the superior chief, Francisco Arredondo as his chief aide and secretary, and Col. Eduardo Agramonte Piña handled the mobilization of the insurgents into several 10-man platoons. Eduardo Agramonte Piña rallied his allies to meet in the early hours of the following morning. 76 Cuban patriots met at the Las Clavellinas river, three miles from Camagüey, organized for battle on November 4, 1868.

=== Battle of Bonilla ===
On November 28, 1868, he engaged in the Battle of Bonilla with the troops of Blas Villate.

When Céspedes became President of the Republic of Cuba in Arms in April 1869, Jerónimo Boza Agramonte served as a colonel in the military division of Camagüey under Maj. Gen. Ignacio Agramonte in Manuel de Quesada's Cuban Liberation Army.

== Death ==
Jerónimo Boza Agramonte died in 1871 when he was executed by firing squad while in the hands of Spanish authorities.
