= Agramonte (surname) =

Agramonte is a toponymic surname of Galician origin. Notable people with the surname include:

- Ángel del Castillo Agramonte (1834–1869), Cuban revolutionary
- Aristides Agramonte (1868–1931), American physician
- Danny Miranda Agramonte (1978–2026), Cuban baseball player
- Eduardo Agramonte Piña (1841–1872), Cuban revolutionary and politician
- Ignacio Agramonte (1841–1873), Cuban politician
- Jerónimo Boza Agramonte (1824–1871), Cuban revolutionary
- Jesús Agramonte (born 1959), Cuban handball player
- Juan Carlos Robinson Agramonte (born 1956), Cuban politician
- Juan de Agramonte (fl. 1511), Spanish sailor
- Roberto Agramonte (1904–1995), Cuban revolutionary
- Tomás Agramonte de la Rosa (born 1978), Dominican baseball player
- Wellington Agramonte (born 1987), Dominican Republic footballer

== See also ==
- Agramonte (disambiguation)
