= Francisco Sánchez Betancourt =

Cuban politician (1827–1894)

Personal details
- Born: Francisco Sánchez y Betancourt; January 31, 1827 Puerto Príncipe, Captaincy General of Cuba, Spanish Empire
- Died: August 30, 1894 (aged 67) Cuba
- Nickname: El Cao

Francisco Sánchez Betancourt (January 31, 1827 – August 30, 1894), was a Cuban revolutionary and politician.

== Biography ==
Francisco Sánchez y Betancourt was born in Puerto Príncipe (now Camagüey), Spanish Cuba, on January 31, 1827. His lineage traced back to one of the region's most prominent families.

=== Ten Years' War ===
In October 1868, as the Ten Years' War broke out, Sánchez aligned himself with the uprising against Spanish control.

The Camagüey region was represented by the Assembly of Representatives of the Center (Spanish: Asamblea de Representantes del Centro), which emerged from the Revolutionary Committee of Camagüey under Salvador Cisneros Betancourt. Its members, including Sánchez, advocated for a more decisive policy than Céspedes' decree. On February 26, 1869, in Camagüey, he joined Salvador Cisneros Betancourt, Antonio Zambrana, Eduardo Agramonte Piña, and Ignacio Agramonte Loynaz in signing the Decree of Abolition of Slavery (Spanish: Abolición de la Esclavitud).

When Céspedes called for a constitutional convention to be held on April 10, 1869, Sánchez Betancourt took part in the Guáimaro Assembly as a delegate of Camagüey. He was elected a member of the House of Representatives.

== Death ==
Francisco Sánchez Betancourt died on August 30, 1894.

José Martí highlighted the life and contributions of Francisco Sánchez Betancourt in a piece published in Patria on September 15, 1894.
