= Miguel Jerónimo Gutiérrez =

Cuban revolutionary and army general (1822–1871)

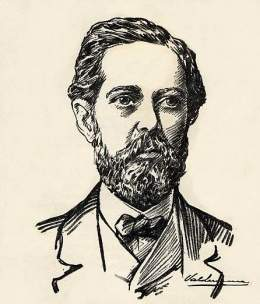
- Born: Miguel Jerónimo Gutiérrez y Hurtado de Mendoza; June 15, 1822; Las Villas, Captaincy General of Cuba, Spanish Empire
- Died: April 19, 1871 (aged 48); Las Villas, Captaincy General of Cuba, Spanish Empire
- Military career
- Allegiance: Cuba
- Branch: Cuban Liberation Army
- Service years: 1868–1871
- Conflicts: Ten Years' War

Miguel Jerónimo Gutiérrez (June 15, 1822 – April 19, 1871) was a Cuban revolutionary, politician, and military officer who played a significant role in the Ten Years' War (1868) and served as the Vice President of the Chamber of Representatives of the Republic in Arms in 1869.

== Early life ==
Miguel Jerónimo Gutiérrez y Hurtado de Mendoza was born in Las Villas, Spanish Cuba on June 15, 1822.

== Ten Years' War ==
Miguel Jerónimo Gutiérrez joined the Ten Years' War after Céspedes' Cry of Yara on October 10, 1868. He was the president of the Revolutionary Junta of Las Villas that supported Céspedes' uprising. In February 1868, he rose up in arms in Las Villas along with Carlos Roloff and many others.

At the Guáimaro Assembly on April 10, 1869, he was a delegate of Las Villas along with Honorato del Castillo, Eduardo Machado, Antonio Lorda, Arcadio García, and Tranquilino Valdés. The Guáimaro Constitution formalized the structure of the revolutionary government, including the creation of the Chamber of Representatives, which served as the legislative body of the Republic in Arms during the Ten Years' War. The Chamber of Representatives of the Republic in Arms was formed with Salvador Cisneros Betancourt as chairman and Gutiérrez designated as vice-chairman.

In Havana, on November 7, 1870, a court-martial convicted Miguel Jerónimo Gutiérrez and conspirators associated with the Cuban Junta of treason and rebellion, sentencing them to death by garrote if they were captured by Spanish authorities.

== Death ==
Miguel Jerónimo Gutiérrez died on April 19, 1871, in Las Villas, Cuba. Eduardo Machado delivered a moving eulogy in his honor.
