= Antonio Zambrana =

Cuban politician (1846-1922)

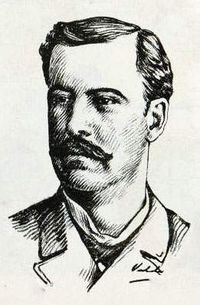

Personal details
- Born: Antonio Zambrana y Vázquez; June 19, 1846 Havana, Captaincy General of Cuba, Spanish Empire
- Died: March 27, 1922 (aged 75) Havana, Cuba

Antonio Zambrana (June 19, 1846 - March 27, 1922) was a Cuban lawyer, jurist, writer, and politician.

== Biography ==
Antonio Zambrana was born in Havana, Spanish Cuba on June 19, 1846. Zambrana's early education was guided by José de la Luz y Caballero at his El Salvador school (Spanish: Colegio El Salvador). He later pursued legal studies and earned his doctorate in 1867.

== Ten Years' War ==
When the Ten Years' War erupted in October 1868, Zambrana threw his support behind the insurrection against Spanish authority.

He was a member of the Central Assembly of Representatives (Spanish: Asamblea de Representantes del Centro). Zambrana and fellow signatories Salvador Cisneros Betancourt, Eduardo Agramonte, Ignacio Agramonte, and Francisco Sánchez Betancourt endorsed the Decree of Abolition of Slavery (Spanish: Abolición de la Esclavitud) in Camagüey on February 26, 1869.

On April 10, 1869, he participated in the Guáimaro Assembly as a delegate of Camagüey and was elected secretary of the House of Representatives. Zambrana and Ignacio Agramonte were designated to draft the proposal of the Guáimaro Constitution. On April 11, the Assembly set up the government with Salvador Cisneros Betancourt as president and Zambrana and Agramonte as secretaries.

In Havana, on November 7, 1870, a court-martial found Zambrana and other members of the Cuban Junta of New York guilty of treason and rebellion, with a death sentence by garrote pending if they were captured by Spanish authorities.

Seeking support for Cuban Independence, he went to the United States in 1873. During his time in New York, created various newspapers and published La República de Cuba. Following extensive preparations and fundraising, Zambrana and Gen. Manuel de Quesada traveled to Latin American countries including Panama, Venezuela, Colombia, and Peru. He wrote El Negro Francisco, an antislavery novel which was published in 1875 in Santiago de Chile. He soon established himself in Costa Rica, working as both a jurist and professor.

On February 5, 1883, the Alvarez-Zambrana treaty between the Republic of Nicaragua and the Republic of Costa Rica was established. Zambrana was appointed as Envoy Extraordinary and Minister Plenipotentiary by Próspero Fernández Oreamuno, President of the Republic of Costa Rica.

In 1886, he returned to Cuba and founded the newspaper El Cubano in Havana.

In 1891, he returned to San José, Costa Rica, where he continued his work in law and education. He worked as a lawyer for Antonio Maceo, who established himself as a sugar planter in Nicoya.

His most distinguished work was developed at the University of Costa Rica School of Law, where he taught Legal History and Roman Law. Zambrana was the first person in Costa Rica to author texts on Roman Law. He also held the role of Dean at the Law School. Appointed by the Costa Rican Congress in 1904, he assumed the role of magistrate within the Court of cassation of Costa Rica's Supreme Court of Justice. Following his re-election in 1908, he continued in his role until resigning in 1911, at which point he departed Costa Rica.

== Death ==
Antonio Zambrana died in Havana, Cuba on March 27, 1922.
