= Agramonte =

Agramonte may refer to:

== People ==
- Agramonte (surname), a surname of Galician origin

== Places ==
=== Cuba ===
- Agramonte, Cuba, village in the Matanzas Province
- Ignacio Agramonte International Airport, in central Camagüey Province

=== Portugal ===
- Agramonte Cemetery, in the city of Porto

=== Spain ===
- Agramonte, Zaragoza, abandoned village in the municipality of Tarazona
