= Henry Reeve (soldier) =

American soldier

Henry Mike Reeve Carroll
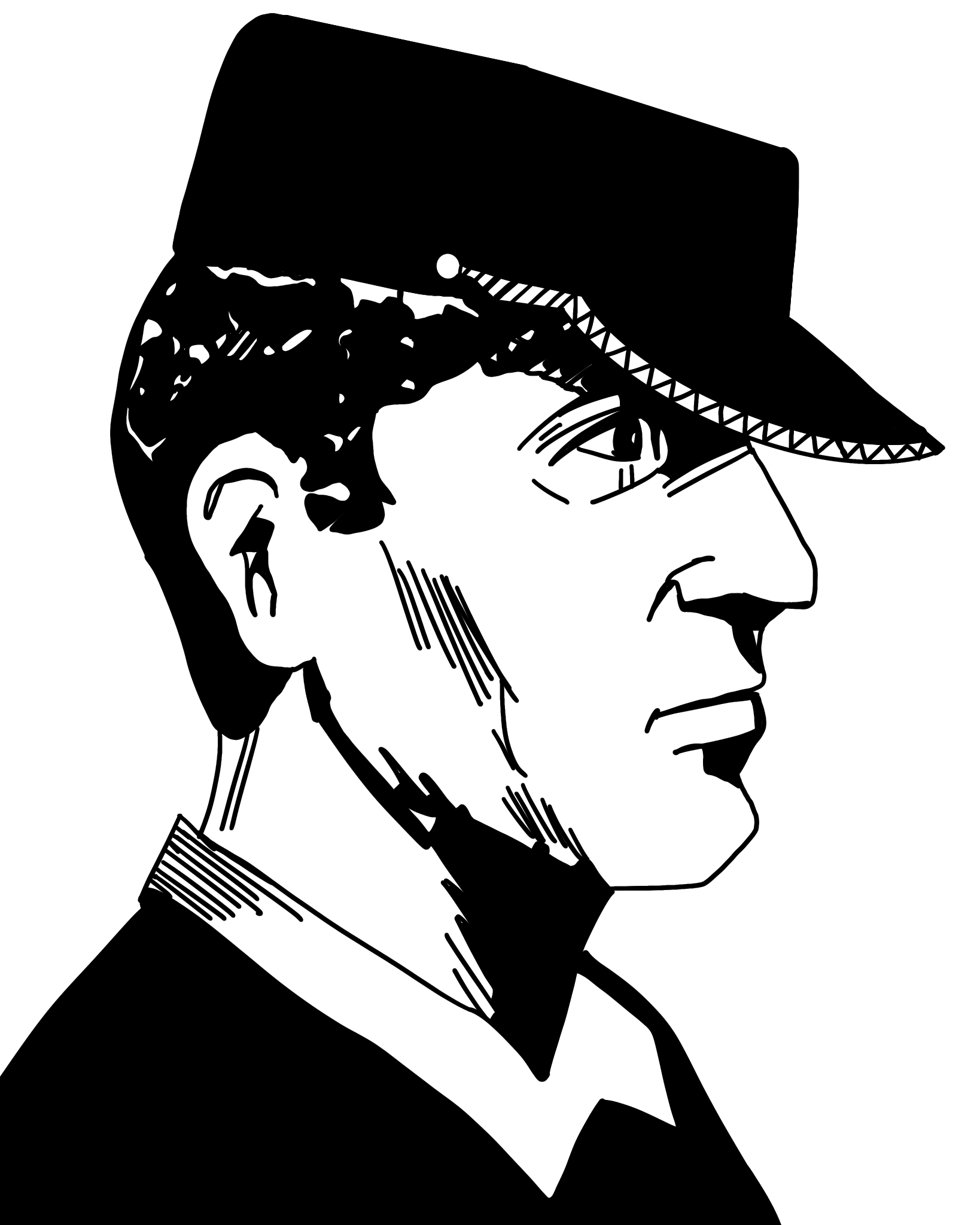
- Born: April 4, 1850; Brooklyn, United States
- Died: August 4, 1876 (aged 26); Yaguaramas, Cuba
- Military career
- Allegiance: United States; Cuba
- Branch: Union Army (1861–1865); Cuban Liberation Army (1869–1876)
- Rank: Drummer Boy (U.S.); Brigadier General (Cuba)
- Nicknames: El Inglesito ("Little Englishman"); Enrique El Americano
- Conflicts: American Civil War; Ten Years' War (Cuba) †; Battle of El Ramón May 16, 1869; Battle of Las Calabazas May 27, 1869; Battle of La Jagua November 18, 1870; Battle of Hato Potrero May 28, 1871; Battle of Limpio Potrero November 27, 1871; Battle of Limpio Potrero November 29, 1872; Battle of Santa Cruz del Sur September 28, 1873; Battle of Canujiro July 4, 1874; Battle of Río Hanábana July 25, 1876; Battle of Yaguarama August 4, 1876

Henry Mike Reeve Carroll (April 4, 1850 – August 4, 1876) was a brigadier general in Cuba's Ejército Libertador (Army of Liberation) – more commonly known as the Ejército Mambí – during the Ten Years' War (1868–1878). In his youth, he was a drummer boy in the Union Army during the American Civil War. During his entire service in Cuba, he wore his US Army uniform. Reeve participated in approximately 400 engagements against Spanish forces, rising through the ranks quickly. Ignacio Agramonte nicknamed him "El Inglesito" ("The Little Englishman") due to his fair complexion and foreign origin.

== Biography ==
He was born in Brooklyn, New York, United States, on April 4, 1850, son of Alexander Reeve and Maddie Carroll, and died in Matanzas, Cuba on August 4, 1876.

Henry Reeve’s experience in the American Civil War solidified his strong opposition to slavery, and he saw Spanish rule in Cuba as one of the last bastions of slavery in the Western Hemisphere. Upon learning of the anti-slavery and anti-Spanish revolution in Cuba, he felt compelled to join the fight.

Inspired by the Cuban struggle for independence, despite not being able to speak a single word of Spanish, Reeve joined the expedition of the steamship Perrit in 1869, adopting the alias Henry Earl.

The expedition arrived in the port of Nipe, Cuba on May 11, 1869, eight months after the beginning of the war. That same day this troop entered into its first combat with the enemy and only five days later, on May 16, Reeve received his first battle wound, in the region of the landing itself.

On May 20, the expedition entered into another encounter with the enemy in El Canalito and almost immediately another in La Cuaba, near Holguín. The expedition was forced to retreat to Las Calabazas.

On May 27, 1869, Reeve was quickly captured by Spanish forces, who attempted to execute him along with his fellow volunteers. The Spaniards shot him along with the rest of the expeditionaries; he received four bullets that went through his body without hitting any vital organ, and they left him for dead.

He regained consciousness and for two days, he walked aimlessly for miles, receiving medical aid from the Mambises in the El Mejías camp of Brigadier General Luis Figueredo.

On June 13, 1869, Henry Reeve was granted the rank of Second Sergeant in the Cuban Liberation Army. After recovering from injuries sustained in combat, he sought reassignment to Camagüey, intending to report directly to President Carlos Manuel de Céspedes and request reintegration into the forces commanded by General Thomas Jordan. At the time, Ignacio Agramonte, a key revolutionary leader, issued a pass for his transfer, though he initially described Reeve as "inept and useless for the service of arms."

By October 1869, Reeve was appointed aide-de-camp to General Thomas Jordan, a former Confederate officer assisting the Cuban cause, who had assumed the role of Chief of the General Staff of the Cuban Liberation Army. Following Jordan's resignation in March 1870, Reeve joined the First Cavalry Squadron of the North Brigade of Camagüey, under the command of Brigadier General Cristóbal Acosta. On April 16, 1870, he was assigned as Head of the Exploration Section of the brigade. Throughout that year, he participated in several key engagements, including battles at Tana, Imías, and Jagua. During the latter battle, on November 18, 1870, he was wounded again.

In March 1871, Reeve was assigned to Ignacio Agramonte’s cavalry unit in Camagüey. After sustaining another wound in battle at Hato Potrero on May 28, 1871, he fought in Estrada and Mulato before taking part in the rescue of Brigadier General Julio Sanguily on October 8, 1871, leading a machete charge alongside Agramonte’s cavalry against a superior Spanish force. Agramonte selected a small force of 35 riders, led by Commander Reeve, to execute the daring rescue mission.

Later that year, Reeve participated in battles at Plátano, La Redonda, San Ramón de Pacheco, Santa Deo, La Matilde, and Sitio Potrero. In the latter engagement, on November 27, 1871, he was wounded again. The following year, on November 29, 1872, he sustained an abdominal wound during the battle of El Carmen, an injury that would trouble him for the remainder of his life.

By 1873, Reeve took part in battles at Ciego de Najasa, Soledad de Pacheco, and Cocal del Olimpo. His valor at the battle of Jimaguayú on May 11, 1873, where Ignacio Agramonte was killed, earned him further distinction. During this engagement, he briefly assumed command of Agramonte’s division, later handing control to Julio Sanguily. By the time that Agramonte died in Jimaguayú, Reeve was already a Colonel.

Following Agramonte's death, Reeve was reassigned to Major General Máximo Gómez and was appointed Chief of Cavalry for the First Division on July 27, 1873. Gómez described Reeve as an exceptional officer, noting his "proven courage, tireless dedication, and strict military discipline."

Reeve’s units frequently outperformed Spanish forces, often defeating larger enemy contingents through bold tactics and unrelenting determination. His combat experience as an American veteran gave him an edge in battle, and his fearlessness earned him a reputation among Cuban revolutionaries. In one notable engagement, he famously leaped over an enemy artillery battery to help secure victory, a feat that led to his promotion to Brigadier General in 1873. Over the course of the war, he suffered more than ten wounds. He was held in high regard alongside legendary Cuban military leaders, such as Máximo Gómez and Ignacio Agramonte.

Henry Reeve consistently led from the front, demonstrating remarkable bravery in battle. Reeve participated in several battles during this period, including Las Yeguas, La Luz, and Atadeo. On September 28, 1873, during the battle of Santa Cruz del Sur, in one of his most notable feats, he personally led an assault on a Spanish artillery battery, seizing it in close combat.

During this engagement, he suffered a devastating wound when shrapnel severely damaged his right leg near the hip from Spanish artillery fire and was subsequently taken to a field hospital in Najasa. This injury, his eleventh in combat, left him unable to ride unaided. After a six-month recovery, he rejoined the fight, having adapted to his injury with a metal prosthesis and specialized riding equipment to secure himself to his horse, allowing him to continue leading his troops in machete charges against Spanish forces.

On June 20, 1874, Reeve was given command of the First Division and was wounded again during the battle of San Antonio de Camujiru on July 4, 1874. In January 1875, he provided artillery cover for Cuban forces crossing the Spanish defensive line known as the Trocha from Júcaro to Morón, allowing Máximo Gómez’s Invading Contingent to advance westward.

Later that year, Reeve requested to participate in the western invasion and was reassigned to Las Villas on November 5, 1875. Recognizing his leadership abilities, Cuban General Máximo Gómez entrusted Reeve with command of the Second Division, responsible for the Camagüey and Villareño cavalries, tasking him with advancing the war into the western regions of the island. On November 30, 1875, Reeve led a cavalry squadron across the Hanabana River, becoming the vanguard of the invading force. Reeve played a key role in the first invasion of Western Cuba, marking his participation in the Battle of Las Guásimas. By May 1875, he had reached the plains of Colón, and by 1876, he had entered Havana province. Over a six-month period, he led a campaign that resulted in the destruction of more than 50 sugar mills, aiming to cripple the Spanish economy that funded their war effort. Between late 1875 and 1876, he fought in battles at Los Abreus, Crocodiles, Quemado Grande, Santa Teresa, Espinal, Lagunillas, and Orbea. In July 1876, he was wounded in the battle of Río Hanabana—one of his last major engagements before his final battle near Yaguaramas on August 4, 1876.

Despite these successes, internal divisions among Cuban revolutionaries, including caudillismo (strongman rule), regionalism, and factionalism, weakened the independence movement. As a result, Reeve found himself leading a significantly reduced force.

On August 4, 1876, in the savannah near Yaguaramas, he and his men were ambushed by Spanish troops and guerrilla forces under Alba de Tormes. During the battle, Reeve’s horse was killed, leaving him stranded on the battlefield. His aide, Rosendo García, attempted to provide him with another mount, but Reeve ordered him to seek cover to avoid being killed. Choosing to stand his ground, he remained beside his fallen horse, armed with a machete in one hand and a revolver in the other. Reeve sustained multiple gunshot wounds, including one to the groin and another to the shoulder. As Spanish troops closed in, he was struck by three additional bullets. Facing imminent capture and out of ammunition, he took his own life with a shot to the right temple.

His body was taken to Cienfuegos as a war trophy and publicly displayed at Reina Cemetery, though the exact location of his burial remains uncertain. At the moment of his death, he was wearing a white jacket and vest, new boots, leggings, and a waist sash, along with a fine pocket watch. His body bore numerous wounds. Though he was not Cuban by birth, Reeve is remembered today as a Cuban national hero, and as a soldier who fought selflessly for his adopted homeland.

== Promotions ==
- Private on May 4, 1869
- Second Sergeant on June 13, 1869
- Lieutenant on October 2, 1869
- Captain on April 16, 1870
- Commander on January 16, 1872
- Lieutenant Colonel on March 3, 1873
- Colonel on July 27, 1873
- Brigadier General on December 10, 1873

== Legacy ==
Reeve was honored by the Cuban government in 1976 on the centenary of his death with a postal stamp.

In response to Hurricane Katrina, Cuba proposed sending a group of 1,586 doctors to assist humanitarian efforts in the United States. The offer was declined, and in September 2005 Cuban president Fidel Castro renamed the group the Henry Reeve Brigade in honor of Reeve.
