= Eduardo Agramonte Piña =

Cuban revolutionary and politician (1841–1872)

Eduardo Agramonte
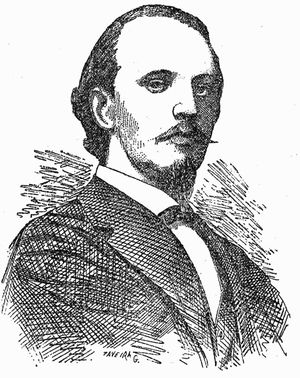

Secretary of the Interior (Ten Years' War)
- In office 1869–1872

Personal details
- Born: Eduardo Agramonte y Piña; 1841 Puerto Principe, Captaincy General of Cuba, Spanish Empire
- Died: March 8, 1872 (aged 30–31) Captaincy General of Cuba, Spanish Empire
- Relations: Aristides Agramonte (son); Ignacio Agramonte (cousin)

Military service
- Allegiance: Cuba
- Branch/service: Cuban Liberation Army
- Years of service: 1868–1872
- Rank: General
- Battles/wars: Ten Years' War; Las Clavellinas Uprising; Battle of Bonilla; Battle of San José del Chorrillo

Eduardo Agramonte y Piña (1841 – March 8, 1872) was a Cuban revolutionary, doctor, and politician who was killed during the Ten Years' War in Cuba.

== Early life ==
Eduardo Agramonte y Piña was born in Puerto Príncipe (now Camagüey) in 1841.

Agramonte's profession was a doctor before the independence campaigns.

He was an active member of the Masonic Order of Tínima No. 16, established in Camagüey in 1866. Although some were against political matters being discussed in their sessions, the Tínima Masonic Lodge was adopted by Camagüey revolutionaries as the conspiracy's hub in Central Cuba. In meetings coordinated by Oriente's Carlos Manuel de Céspedes with different revolutionary groups, it was proposed to support the cause of an insurrection in Eastern Cuba.

== Ten Years' War ==
Agramonte took action when the war of independence against Spain erupted on October 10, 1868, following the Cry of Yara.

=== Las Clavellinas Uprising ===
He was instrumental in the Las Clavellinas Uprising in Camagüey in November 1868. Once Salvador Cisneros Betancourt conveyed the uprising circumstances, Eduardo Agramonte Piña summoned his loyal allies to convene at dawn the next day. The Las Clavellinas river, three miles from Puerto Príncipe (now Camagüey), was the meeting point for 76 Cuban patriots on November 4, 1868, who were determined to partake in the revolt. Col. Eduardo Agramonte Piña proposed a military structure of the insurgents, and Gen. Jerónimo Boza Agramonte assumed command as the superior chief.

Established on November 26, 1868, the Revolutionary Committee of Camagüey, acting as the provisional provincial government, was chaired by Salvador Cisneros Betancourt and included Eduardo Agramonte and Ignacio Agramonte. Agramonte y Peña, alongside Salvador Cisneros Betancourt, Ignacio Agramonte, Francisco Sánchez y Betancourt, and Antonio Zambrana signed the Decree of Abolition of Slavery (Spanish: Abolición de la Esclavitud) on February 26, 1869, formally abolishing slavery in Camagüey.

=== Political career ===
When Carlos Manuel de Céspedes became President of the Republic of Cuba in Arms in April 1869, Eduardo Agramonte was appointed to the Céspedes cabinet as the Secretary of the Interior. He was elected by the House of Representatives at Guáimaro on April 11, 1869.

Agramonte and others from the second Cuban Junta were convicted of treason and rebellion in November 1870, with a death sentence by garrote awaiting them if they fell into Spanish hands.

=== Battle of San José del Chorrillo ===
Col. Eduardo Agramonte Piña's last engagement was the 1872 Battle of San José del Chorrillo.

== Personal life ==
His sisters were Angeline Agramonte de Primelles and Carmelle Agramonte.

His first cousin was Cuban patriot Ignacio Agramonte. Aristides Agramonte, his son, was born in the summer of 1868 in Cuba. Aristides grew up in New York and became noted for his part in the discovery that a certain mosquito species transmits yellow fever.

== Death ==
Eduardo Agramonte y Piña was killed in action in San José del Chorrillo, Camagüey Province in Cuba on March 8, 1872. Following his death, his family sought refuge in the United States.
