= Nuevitas–Camagüey Road =

Road in Cuba

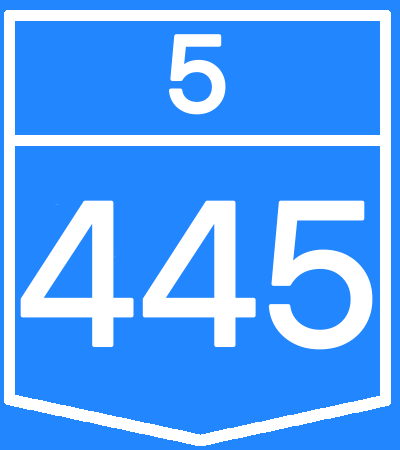
Carretera Nuevitas–Camagüey
- Nuevitas–Camagüey Road
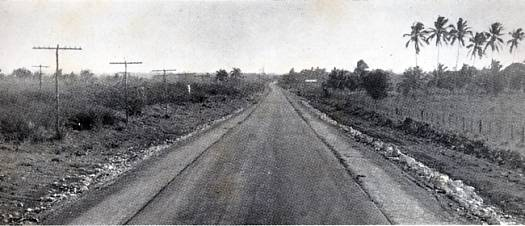
- Early photo of the road

Route information
- Length: 75.5 km (46.9 mi)

Major junctions
- East end: Calle Albaiza (Nuevitas)
- 5–I–3
- West end: Camagüey Beltway (Camagüey)

Location
- Country: Cuba
- Provinces: Camagüey
- Municipalities: Camagüey, Minas, Nuevitas
- Major cities: Camagüey
- Towns: Nuevitas, Minas
- Villages: Cromo, Altagarcia, Redencion, San Agustin

Highway system
- Roads in Cuba

The Nuevitas–Camagüey Road (5–445) is a two-lane road connecting the municipalities of Nuevitas and Camagüey in Cuba. It had a length of 75.5 kilometres (46.9 mi) in 1947, although it was shortened due to the construction of the Circunvalación Norte of Camagüey, becoming about 71 kilometres (44 mi).

== Characteristics ==
The road was made to connect Nuevitas and other villages nearby with the rest of the country and have a way to trade sugar, as Nuevitas is the primary port for exports of it. The road has two sections, one going from Camagüey to the Ignacio Agramonte International Airport, where the lanes are separated, and from the airport to Nuevitas, where they conjoin.

== History ==
Beginning the construction of the road proved to be tough. They had a lack of equipment to make the road, and they needed 32 dump trucks, five tankers, six rollers, two cranes, two graders, a bulldozer, a paver, and over 300 workers in order to finally finish the road.

== Routes ==
Municipality	Location	↓km↓	Destination	Notes
Nuevitas	Nuevitas	0	Calle Albaiza/Calle Agramonte	
Nuevitas	Nuevitas	1.4	Avenida Circunvalación	
Nuevitas		10.5	5–I–23 (Circuito Norte)	
Minas	Entronque de Lugerno	25	5–541 (Carretera a Lugareño) / Carretera a Playa Santa Lucía – Lugareño, Playa Santa Lucia	
Minas		39.3	Calle Camilo Cienfuegos (Carretera a Minas del Este) – Minas	
Minas	Minas	42.7	5–521 (Calle Cisneros / Carretera a Minas del Oeste) – Minas	
Camagüey		66	5–461 (Carretera Camagüey–Sierra de Cubitas) – Paso de Vilató, Sierra de Cubitas	
Camagüey		66.2	Ignacio Agramonte International Airport International Terminal	
Camagüey		67.1	Ignacio Agramonte International Airport National Terminal	
Camagüey		71.3	Circunvalación Norte	Continues as Avenida Dr. Carlos Juan Finlay
