= Henry Reeve Brigade =

Cuban group of medical professionals

The Henry Reeve International Contingent of Doctors Specialized in Disasters and Serious Epidemics (Spanish: Contingente Internacional de médicos especializados en situaciones de desastre y graves epidemias "Henry Reeve"), better known as Henry Reeve Brigade, is a Cuban group of medical professionals established by Fidel Castro in September 2005 with the mission of international medical solidarity, deployed worldwide in major health crises. By mid 2020, the Brigade was active in 51 nations and territories.

== History ==
In 2005, Fidel Castro offered to send more than 1,500 medical professionals to help the people of the United States of America in the aftermath of Hurricane Katrina. The offer was declined, and the newly formed contingent got the name The Henry Reeve brigade, commemorating the New York-born brigadier of Cuban Liberation Army in the Ten Years' War, Henry Reeve. The first organised international mission of the brigade was in Angola in 2005.

== Missions ==
Since 2005, 28 groups from the Brigade have carried out humanitarian missions in 22 countries, with almost 8,000 medical professionals fighting the effects of 16 floods, eight hurricanes, eight earthquakes, four epidemics including three teams that faced the West African Ebola virus epidemic. Examples of Brigade's missions include:

- Guatemala (Hurricane Stan): 8 October 2005, 687 participants (600 doctors)
- Bolivia (floods): 3 February - 22 May 2006, 602 participants (601 doctors)
- Indonesia (earthquake): 16 May 2006, 135 participants (78 doctors)
- Mexico (floods): 6 November - 26 December 2007, 54 participants (39 doctors)
- China (2008 Sichuan earthquake): 23 May - 9 June 2008, 35 participants (18 doctors).
- Barbados (COVID-19 pandemic in Barbados): 126 medical doctors, nurses and lab technologists.

Other notable missions include 2005 Kashmir earthquake, 2010 Haiti Earthquake, 2010 Chile earthquake and 2014 Great Fire of Valparaíso.

== Award ==
The Brigade was awarded the Dr. Lee Jong-wook Memorial Prize for Public Health by the World Health Organization in 2017. The award was "in recognition of its emergency medical assistance to more than 3.5 million people in 21 countries affected by disasters and epidemics since the founding of the Brigade in September 2005".

== See also ==
- Cuban medical internationalism
