= General Cemetery of Camagüey =

Cemetery in Camagüey, Cuba

- Cementerio General de Camagüey
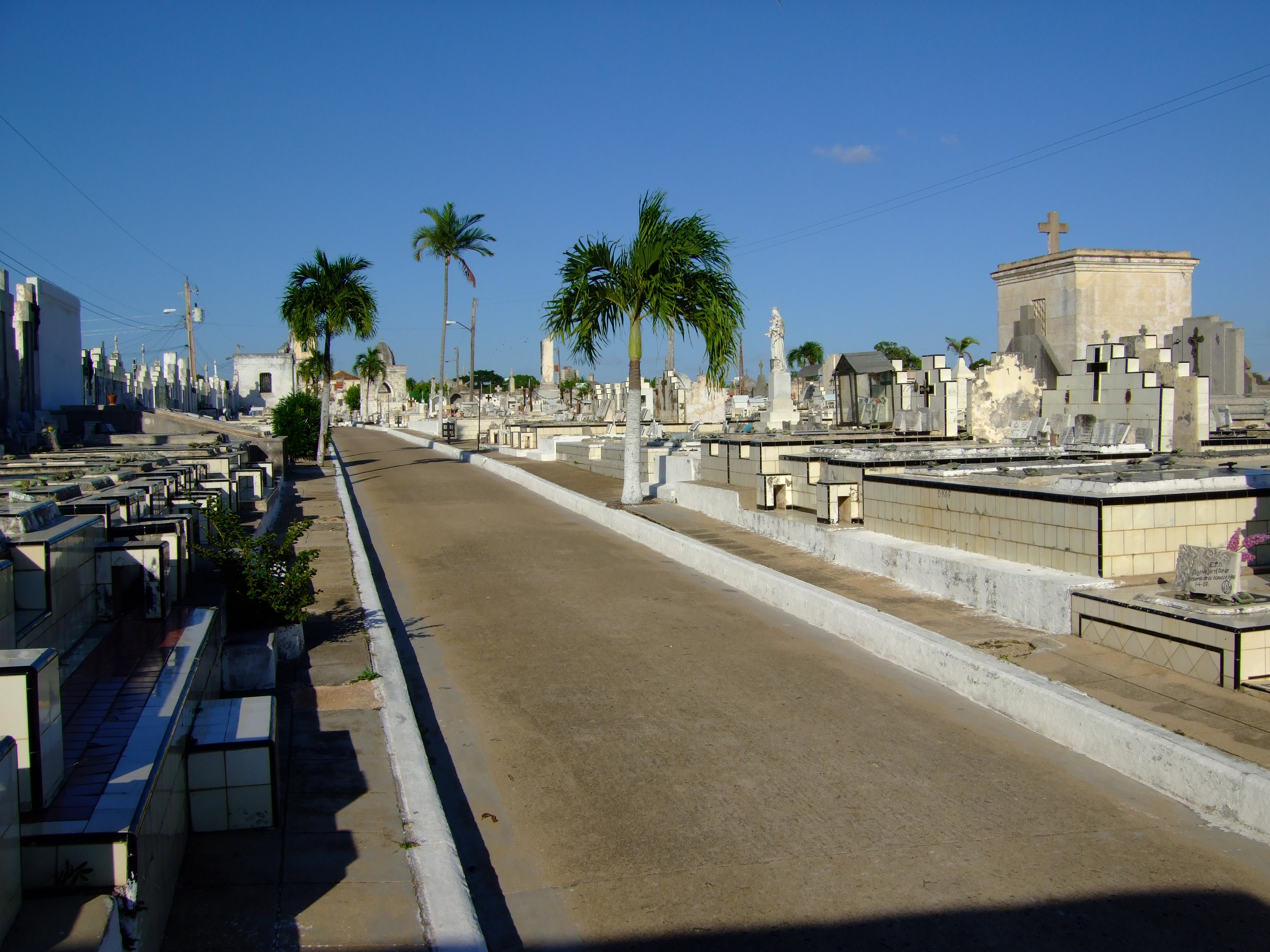
- Necrópolis de Camagüey, a cemetery in the Western part of Camagüey.

Details
- Established: 1814 (211 years ago)
- Location: 20 De Mayo, Camagüey
- Country: Cuba
- Coordinates: 21°22′31″N 77°55′31″W
- Type: Cemetery

The General Cemetery of Camagüey or simply Camagüey General Cemetery, also known as the Necrópolis de Camagüey (Spanish: Cementerio General de Camagüey), is the cemetery and necropolis of Camagüey Province and the city of Camagüey in Central Cuba.

Situated in the city's western area, it is known as the oldest cemetery operating in Cuba. It contains the remains of key Cuban heroes and historical figures from Camagüey, including former President of the Republic in Arms Salvador Cisneros Betancourt, Ignacio Agramonte, Tomás Betancourt, and Augusto Arango.

== History ==
Established in the 1800s, it has been accessible to the local population since May 3, 1814. It is located in Camagüey (formerly Puerto Príncipe), a city which holds the status of a UNESCO World Heritage Site. On 20 De Mayo in the Plaza Del Cristo area, it is positioned behind the Iglesia de Santo Cristo del Buen Viaje.

== Notable burials and memorials ==
- Salvador Cisneros Betancourt (d. 1914)
- Ignacio Agramonte (d. 1873)
- Tomás Betancourt
- Augusto Arango (d. 1869)
