= Guáimaro Municipal Museum =

Museum in Cuba

- Museo Municipal de Guáimaro
- Established: 10 April 1970
- Location: Guáimaro, Cuba

Guáimaro Municipal Museum is located on Constitution Street in Guáimaro, Cuba. It was established on 10 April 1970.

The museum holds collections on history, weaponry, archeology and decorative arts.

== See also ==
- List of museums in Cuba
