= Coat of arms of Camagüey Province =

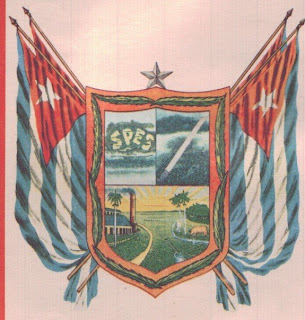

Versions
- unerroneous version of the coat of arms
- Armiger: Province of Camagüey
- Adopted: 1926 & 1995

The Coat of arms of Camagüey Province is the official heraldic symbol of Camagüey Province, Cuba.

== History ==
It was made on December 15, 1926, by Ángel Hernández Navarro, and approved by the governor of Camagüey Province on December 22, 1926. In 1976 after the provincial split of Cuban provinces and after Ciego de Ávila Province split from the province they removed the coat of arms. In 1995 the Assembly of People's Power of the Camagüey Province reput the coat of arms.
