= Minas Municipal Museum =

Museum in Cuba

- Museo Municipal de Minas
- Established: 29 December 1982
- Location: Minas, Cuba

Minas Municipal Museum is a museum located in Coralon street in Minas, Cuba. It was established on 29 December 1982.

The museum holds collections on history and weaponry.

== See also ==
- List of museums in Cuba
