= Juan Bautista Spotorno =

President of Cuba from 1875 to 1876

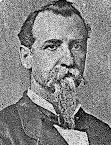

3rd President of the Republic of Cuba in Arms
- In office March 1875 – March 1876
- Vice President: Francisco Vicente Aguilera
- Preceded by: Salvador Cisneros Betancourt
- Succeeded by: Tomás Estrada Palma

Personal details
- Born: September 13, 1832 Trinidad, Cuba
- Died: October 29, 1917 (85 years old) Trinidad, Cuba

Juan Bautista Spotorno (1832–1917) was a president of Cuba. He was an interim President of the Republic of Cuba in Arms from 1875 to 1876.

== Life ==
Spotorno grew up in an Italian family in Trinidad, Cuba, where he was born on September 13, 1832. His name goes back to the Ligurian coastal town of Spotorno. As a child, he was sent to Italy for education and later to the United States. In the US, he began studies for a medical degree, which he did not complete, but instead devoted himself to commerce and returned to his homeland.

From 1863, he was councilor of Trinidad and leader of the first cavalry of the Spanish militia. On 24 February 1870, he was promoted to colonel. In 1871, he went to the province of Puerto Príncipe and followed General Major Ignacio Agramonte (the "George Washington" of Cuba). In 1873, he was elected to the House of Representatives of Las Villas.

...el 29 de junio Juan Bautista Spotorno se convirtio' en el tercer presidente, aunque interino, de Cuba libre (on June 29, Juan Bautista Spotorno was the third president -as interim- of Cuba Free)... Luis Navarro

As a result of the resignation of Salvador Cisneros Betancourt, Spotorno became his successor as "interim" president of the "Republic of Cuba in Arms" on 29 June 1875. In less than one year, he improved the government to positive levels. The final accomplishment of Spotorno's administration was the holding of elections to the House of Representatives; these were held without problems. On 21 March 1876, he gave up the presidency to Tomás Estrada Palma and returned to the House of Representatives. He was known for his honesty.

After the war, he became a member of the Liberal Party and fought bravely in the war of 1895 for the independence of Cuba.

Spotorno died on 29 October 1917. His funeral was held with huge crowds of Cubans, who appreciated his honesty and integrity.

== See also ==
- Tomás Estrada Palma
- Italian Cubans
- Liberal Party of Cuba

== Bibliography ==
- El Criollo. Album de el Criollo: semblanzas. Est. tip. O'Reilly (número 9). Havana, 1888.
- Navarro, Luis. Las guerras de España en Cuba.Volume 116 of Ensayos (Encuentro). Publisher Encuentro. Madrid, 1998 ISBN 8474904749
- Otero, Juan Joaquin. Libro De Cuba, Una Enciclopedia Ilustrada Que Abarca Las Artes, Las Letras, Las Ciencias, La Economia, La Politica, La Historia, La Docencia, Y ElProgreso General De La Nacion Cubana - Edicion Conmemorative del Cincuentenario de la Republica de Cuba, 1952. La Habana, 1954
