= Salvador Cisneros Betancourt =

Cuban politician (1828–1914)

Salvador Cisneros y Betancourt, Marquis of Santa Lucía
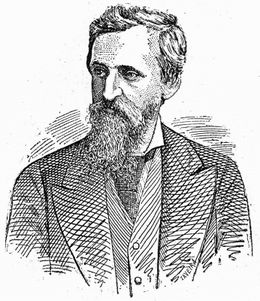

2nd President of the Republic of Cuba in Arms
- In office 1873–1875
- Preceded by: Carlos Manuel de Céspedes
- Succeeded by: Juan Bautista Spotorno
- Constituency: Republic of Cuba in Arms

8th President of the Republic of Cuba in Arms
- In office 1895–1897
- Preceded by: Manuel de Jesús Calvar
- Succeeded by: Bartolomé Masó Márquez
- Constituency: Republic of Cuba in Arms

Personal details
- Born: Salvador Cisneros y Betancourt; February 10, 1828 Puerto Príncipe, Captaincy General of Cuba, Spanish Empire
- Died: February 28, 1914 (aged 86) Havana, Cuba
- Resting place: General Cemetery of Camagüey

Military service
- Allegiance: Cuba
- Branch/service: Cuban Liberation Army
- Battles/wars: Ten Years' War; Cuban War of Independence; Spanish-American War

Salvador Cisneros y Betancourt (February 10, 1828 – February 28, 1914) was a Cuban revolutionary and statesman, who was the only Cuban to become the president of the Republic of Cuba twice.

== Early life ==
Salvador Cisneros y Betancourt was born in Puerto Príncipe (now Camagüey), Spanish Cuba on February 10, 1828.

Born into a noble and wealthy family of planters, he inherited the title of II Marquis of Santa Lucía in 1846. The King of Spain granted the title to his father following a donation of the lands on which the town of Nuevitas in Puerto Príncipe was founded. He was a relative of Gaspar Betancourt Cisneros.

When his uncle relocated to the United States to settle in Philadelphia in the late 1840s, Salvador's father sent him to get his education in the country. He graduated at the top of his class with a degree in Civil Engineering.

From the 1850s, he engaged in early activities of Cuba's bid for independence from the Spanish Empire, joining the annexationist movement. He was involved in Joaquín de Agüero's independence uprising in Camagüey in 1851 and faced arrest, banishment, and exile from Cuba as a consequence of his political actions.

In 1866, he joined the Masonic Order of Tínima No. 16, a masonic lodge in Camagüey. The Tínima Masonic lodge gradually emerged as the breeding ground for revolutionary activities in Central Cuba, as adopted by Camagüey revolutionaries.

== Ten Years' War ==
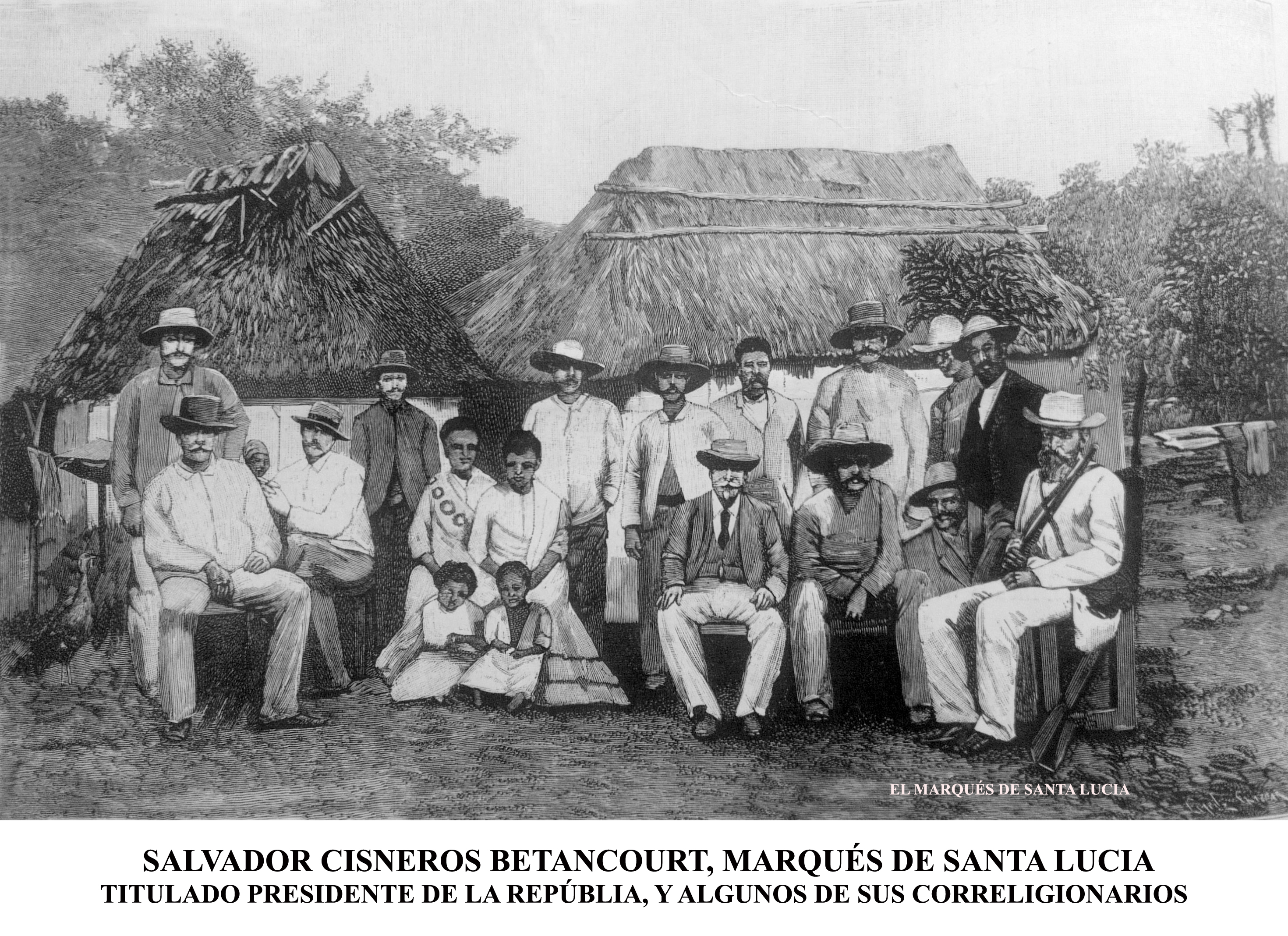
Salvador Cisneros y Betancourt, II Marquis of Santa Lucía, President of the Republic, and some of his co-religionists

On August 4, 1868, Salvador Cisneros Betancourt took part in a revolutionary meeting coordinated by Carlos Manuel de Céspedes at a property in Las Tunas. It united revolutionary committees and paved the way for the insurrection that sparked the Ten Years' War, Cuba's first major independence struggle against Spanish rule.

Following the Cry of Yara by Céspedes in October 1868, Cisneros Betancourt relinquished his title of Marquis, freed his slaves, and dedicated his assets to the cause. His estates were confiscated but were partially restored following the Pact of Zanjón.

He coordinated the Las Clavellinas Uprising against the Spanish government in Camagüey Province in Central Cuba, which took place on November 4, 1868.

The Revolutionary Committee of Camagüey (Spanish: Comité Revolucionario de Camagüey) was formed under Cisneros Betancourt on November 26, 1868. He chaired the committee with members including Eduardo Agramonte Piña and Ignacio Agramonte Loynaz. Temporarily, it operated as the provincial leadership, managing all military activities under Augusto Arango's command. The Central Assembly of Representatives (Spanish: Asamblea de Representantes del Centro), an extension of the Revolutionary Committee of Camagüey was formed to represent the Camagüeyans. The members lobbied for a stronger policy than the decree of Céspedes. On February 26, 1869, Cisneros Betancourt signed the Decree of Abolition of Slavery (Spanish: Abolición de la Esclavitud) along with Eduardo Agramonte, Ignacio Agramonte, Francisco Sánchez y Betancourt, and Antonio Zambrana.

While Cisneros Betancourt was in Havana, Céspedes called for a constitutional convention to be held, prompting him to leave for Guáimaro. As a delegate of Camagüey at the Assembly of Guáimaro, he was elected Speaker of the House of Representatives and presided over the single-chamber legislature. On April 10, 1869, fifteen parliamentarians formed the Assembly, and the Constitution of Guáimaro was signed by Salvador Cisneros Betancourt and others. In the following months, he organized the second Revolutionary Cuban Junta.

Cisneros Betancourt and others linked to the Cuban Junta were found guilty of treason and rebellion by a court-martial in Havana on November 7, 1870, and were sentenced to death by garrote if caught by Spanish forces.

He succeeded Carlos Manuel de Céspedes as the President of the Republic of Cuba in Arms from 1873 to 1875. Juan Bautista Spotorno became his successor upon his resignation in June 1875.

In 1878, he rejected the Pact of Zanjón, and when the insurgents' cause collapsed, he sought refuge in New York and spent eight years there before returning to Cuba.

== Cuban War of Independence ==
During the Cuban War of Independence from 1895 to 1898, Cisneros Betancourt employed himself in favor of Cuban independence and joined the mambises.

After José Marti, who was the Cuban president during the War for Independence, died in May 1895, the Ten Years' War veteran took over. As members of the Jimaguayú Constitutional Assembly of 1895, delegates from all the Cuban provinces met in September 1895. The Jimaguayú Constitution was adopted on the 16th of the month. The members established a civil government of the Cuban Republic in Arms consisting of a president, vice-president, and cabinet. On September 19, 1895, Salvador Cisneros Betancourt was elected as the President of the Provisional Government of Cuba with Bartolomé Masó as vice-president and Tomás Estrada Palma, the delegate plenipotentiary. General-in-chief Máximo Gómez and Lieutenant general Antonio Maceo were elected and exercised sole authority over all military operations. Although, Cisneros Betancourt advocated that even during wartime, the military should be under the authority of the civil government rather than acting independently. His first cabinet included Secretary of Internal Affairs Santiago G. Canizares, Secretary of Agriculture Severo Pina, Secretary of Foreign Affairs Rafael Portuondo, Secretary of War Carlos Roloff and Vice-Secretary of War Mario G. Menocal. He held office until October 30, 1897, and was succeeded by Bartolomé Masó Márquez.

In August 1900, he visited President William McKinley in Washington to protest abuses inflicted upon the Cuban people by the United States Military Government in Cuba, especially under Military Governor Leonard Wood. He published the Appeal to the American People on Behalf of Cuba on August 24, 1900.

He opposed the Platt Amendment in 1901, which specified the terms for the United States' termination of its military occupation in Cuba. In 1902, Salvador Cisneros Betancourt was elected to the Cuban Senate following the 1901 Cuban general election. On October 10, 1907, he established the Revolutionary Junta of Havana, to oppose closer ties with the United States.

He held the position of president of the National Veterans' Council in 1911 and, in 1913, headed the Committee for the Abolition of the Platt Amendment.

== Death ==
Salvador Cisneros Betancourt died in Havana, Cuba on February 28, 1914. He was buried in the General Cemetery of Camagüey.
