= Thomas Jordan (general) =

Confederate Army general (1819–1895)

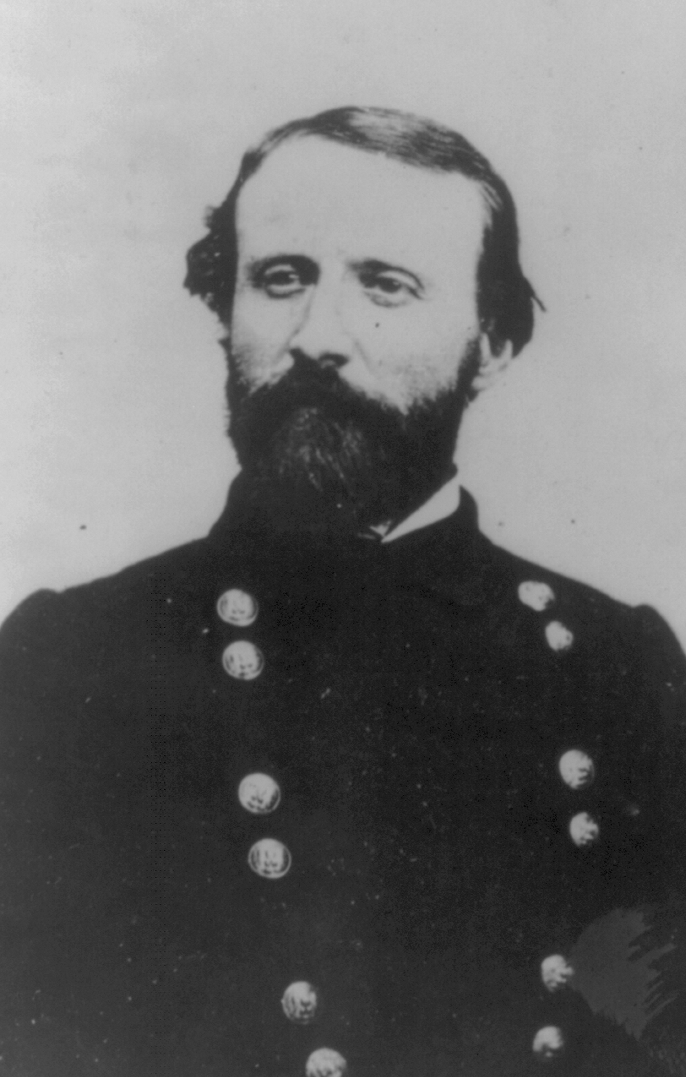
- Born: September 30, 1819; Luray, Virginia
- Died: November 27, 1895 (aged 76); New York City, New York
- Burial place: Mount Hope Cemetery, Westchester County, New York
- Relatives: Gabriel and Elizabeth "Betsey" Ann Seibert Jordan (parents)
- Military career
- Allegiance: United States of America; Confederate States of America; Cuba
- Branch: United States Army; Confederate States Army; Cuban Liberation Army
- Service years: 1840–1861 (USA); 1861–1865 (CSA); 1868–1870 (CLA)
- Rank: Captain (USA); Brigadier General (CSA); General (CLA)
- Commands: Third Military District of South Carolina (CSA); General-in-Chief of the Cuban Liberation Army (CLA)
- Conflicts: Second Seminole War; Mexican–American War Battle of Palo Alto Battle of Resaca de la Palma; American Civil War First Battle of Bull Run; Ten Years' War (Cuba)

Thomas Jordan (September 30, 1819 – November 27, 1895) was a Confederate general and major operative in the network of Confederate spies during the American Civil War. A career soldier in the armies of three nations, he had previously fought in the Mexican–American War, and in 1868 was appointed as chief of staff of the Cuban insurgent army, which fought to achieve independence from Spain. He resigned in 1870 and returned to the United States, where he settled in New York City. Jordan was also a newspaper editor and author, writing articles about the American Civil War.

== Early life and career ==
Thomas Jordan was born the oldest child of Gabriel and Elizabeth "Betsey" Seibert Jordan in the Luray Valley, Virginia. He is believed to have been educated in the local schools of Shenandoah County, Virginia (later Page County, Virginia). He received an appointment to the United States Military Academy at West Point, graduating in 1840.

Jordan entered the army as a second lieutenant in the 3rd U.S. Infantry, and was assigned to the garrison at Fort Snelling, Minnesota. He fought in the Second Florida War against the Seminole Indians. He was among those soldiers who surprised and captured Chief "Tiger Tail" near Cedar Keys in November 1842.

Jordan was assigned to western frontier duty until 1846, when he was promoted to first lieutenant. In the Mexican–American War, he served creditably at the battles of Palo Alto and Resaca de la Palma. In 1847, he was promoted to captain and served as a quartermaster. He remained at Vera Cruz for a year after the war in an administrative role. He was next posted to various Southern garrisons and on the Pacific Coast.

As early as 1860, he secretly began a pro-Southern spy network in Washington, D.C., that was particularly active in the period immediately after secession. In early 1861, Jordan passed control of the espionage network to Rose O'Neal Greenhow; however, he continued to receive and evaluate her reports after she was restricted to house arrest in August 1861 and imprisoned in Washington, DC in January 1862. He appeared to be her Confederate Secret Service "handler" during the formative phase of Confederate intelligence.

== Civil War ==
On May 22, 1861, Jordan resigned from the U.S. Army. He was commissioned as a captain in the fledgling Confederate army. Promotion came rapidly and by June 1861, he had become a lieutenant colonel and a staff officer, seeing duty at the First Battle of Manassas as a full colonel and chief of staff under P.G.T. Beauregard. He also was the army's adjutant general and accompanied President Jefferson Davis on a post-battle tour of the field.

Jordan subsequently accompanied Beauregard to the Western Theater to Kentucky. During the advance from Corinth, Mississippi, into Tennessee, he rendered valuable service in preparing the men for the Battle of Shiloh, where he was conspicuous in efficiently managing the flow of orders to and from the various corps commanders and their respective staffs.

For his actions at Shiloh, he was promoted to brigadier general on April 14, 1862, and served as chief of staff for General Braxton Bragg during his Kentucky Campaign. When Beauregard was reassigned to the defense of Charleston, South Carolina, Jordan accompanied his long-time friend and mentor as chief of staff for that department. In May 1864, he was assigned to the command of the Third Military District of South Carolina.

== Postbellum ==
Immediately after the Civil War, Jordan lived in Tennessee, where he published a critical review of the Confederate operations and administration in Harper's Magazine. He was the editor of the Memphis Appeal newspaper in 1866. In 1868, he co-published with J. B. Pryor a book entitled The Campaigns of Lieutenant-General Forrest.

That same year, General Jordan, with his lengthy administrative and combat experience, was appointed as chief of staff of the Cuban insurgent army. In May 1869, as General-in-Chief of the Cuban Liberation Army, he landed at Mayarí with 300 men, and with enough arms, ammunition and supplies for the 6,000 additional men whom he hoped would rise to join the rebellion. In December 1869, Jordan became military head of the Cuban Mambi army, who were fighting for Cuban independence from Spain in the Ten Years' War. He scored a significant victory over superior enemy forces at Guaimaro in January 1870. Extremely short of supplies, Jordan resigned from his Cuban post a month later and returned to the United States, ending his long military career.

Jordan eventually settled in New York City and owned a home on Grymes Hill in Staten Island. Continuing his interest in writing, Jordan published numerous articles on the Civil War and became the editor of the Mining Record.

Jordan is buried in Mount Hope Cemetery in Hastings-on-Hudson in Westchester County, New York.

== See also ==
- List of American Civil War generals (Confederate)
