= Ignacio Agramonte International Airport =

International airport in Camagüey Province, Cuba

Ignacio Agramonte International Airport Aeropuerto Internacional Ignacio Agramonte
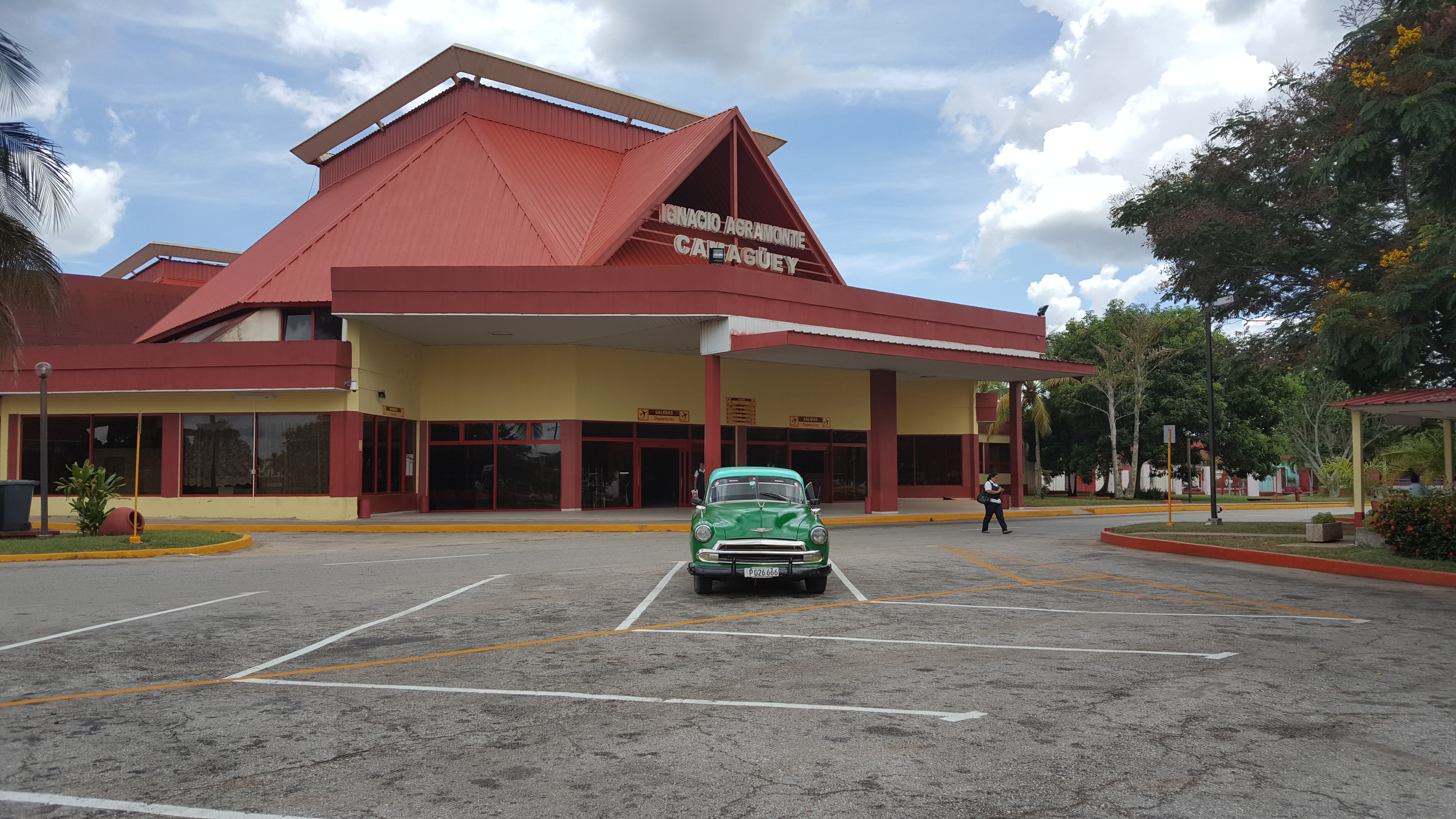
- IATA: CMW; ICAO: MUCM

Summary
- Airport type: Public
- Operator: ECASA
- Serves: Camagüey, Cuba
- Elevation AMSL: 126 m (413 ft)
- Coordinates: 21°25′13″N 077°50′51″W
- Website: camaguey.airportcuba.net

Map
- Location in Cuba

Runways
| Direction | Length | | Surface |
| Direction | m | ft | Surface |
|---|---|---|---|
| 07/25 | 3,000 | 9,843 | Asphalt |
- Source: Aerodrome chart

Ignacio Agramonte International Airport (Spanish: Aeropuerto Internacional Ignacio Agramonte) (IATA: CMW, ICAO: MUCM) is an international airport in central Camagüey Province, Cuba. It serves the city of Camagüey and the resort village of Santa Lucía.

== History ==
During World War II, the airport was used by the United States Army Air Forces Sixth Air Force from 1942 until 1944. The 25th Bombardment Group 417th Bombardment Squadron flew B-18 Bolo bombers from the airfield, known as Camaguey Air Base, from 13 April 1942 through August 1943. The squadron flew antisubmarine missions over the northern Caribbean. The base was also used for air-sea rescue missions by the 1st Rescue Squadron.

From 1 January 1943, the USAAF set up postal operations for Camaguey using the Army Post Office, Miami with the address: 2714 APO MIA. The United States Navy also set up using a non-descript number for postal operations. They used the Fleet Post Office, Atlantic located in New York City with the address: 617 FPO NY.

The airport also used to be a base for the Cuban Revolutionary Armed Forces with the 3685th Regiment and 2 General purpose transport squadrons operating Mil Mi-17 helicopters based here.

The airport was closed from March to October 2020 due to the COVID-19 pandemic.

== Airlines and destinations ==
The following airlines operate regular scheduled and charter flights at Ignacio Agramonte International Airport:

| Airlines | Destinations |
|---|---|
| American Airlines | Miami |
| Viva | Seasonal: Cancún |
