= Guáimaro Constitution =

República de Cuba en Armas
- 1869–1899
| Spanish Cuba | American Cuba |
- Coat of arms of the República de Cuba en Armas

The Guáimaro Constitution was the governing document for the República de Cuba en Armas written by the idealistic and politically liberal faction (the Constituent Assembly of 1869) in the insurgency that contested Spanish colonial rule in Cuba and imposed on Carlos Manuel de Céspedes, the conservative who claimed leadership of the independence movement.

It was nominally in effect from 1869 to 1878 during the Ten Years' War against Spain, the first of a series of conflicts that led to Cuban independence in 1898.

The constitutional assembly abolished slavery, approved a motion for annexation of Cuba by the United States, and established a separation of powers.

== Background ==
On 10 October 1868, a group in Oriente Province led by sugar planter and mill owner Carlos Manuel de Céspedes proclaimed Cuba's independence from Spain, launching a decade of hostilities known as the Ten Years' War. He assumed the title of captain general and ruled a small independent area in the style of a Spanish colonial governor. A second group of rebels, Havana students from prominent families, had formed their own Revolutionary Committee and rejected both Céspedes' conservativism and his claim to lead the insurgency which, in their view, he had launched precipitously in order to assume its leadership. They assembled in Camagüey Province in December. Political idealists, they were led by Ignacio Agramonte, a young lawyer with radical liberal views. He said: "We Camagüeyans are determined not to depend ever on any dictatorship whatsoever, nor to follow in the footsteps of the first authority of the Eastern [Oriente] department." The Revolutionary Committee announced that in the area it controlled "the military power is subordinated to the civil power, and the authority of the latter is limited by the rights of the people." Though engaged in a military campaign, they mistrusted military authority, which they associated with martial law and dictatorship, as evidenced by regimes–all born of earlier independence movements decades earlier–in many Latin American countries, including Francisco Solano López in Paraguay, Mariano Melgarejo in Bolivia, and Gabriel García Moreno in Ecuador.

A military defeat in January 1869 left Céspedes without a territory under his control. In March a third rebel group announced its support of the Camagüeyans. To salvage his position Céspedes agreed to a compromise. He relinquished his claim to military authority, accepted the position of president of the new republic, and agreed that the powers of that office would be defined by a constitution.

== Assembly of Guáimaro ==
The Camagüeyans and those rebels who shared their political principles met on 10 April 1869, in Guáimaro, where in a single day they wrote and adopted their governing document, the Guáimaro Constitution. Its principal authors were Agramonte and Antonio Zambrana. It made no concession to Céspedes' views. Its central feature was a unicameral legislature, a House of Representatives, that appointed the president and chief of the military, who both served at the pleasure of the legislature.

In practice, the House never trusted President Céspedes, who continued to issue military orders without regard for the military leadership appointed by the House. The House was hampered in taking action against Céspedes by the military situation, which remained precarious and sometimes prevented the House from meeting. The war required local military leaders, even Agramonte when he took on a military role, to function as near dictators. As one historian assesses the constitutional experiment:

[Local military leaders] were the ones who laid down the rebel law in their territories, and they were therefore the real wielders of power in the insurrectionists' camp. In this context it is easy to understand why the idealistic language of the Guáimaro Constitution soon began to ring hollow and why the central government it proclaimed came to be a chimeric institution. Geography and the realities of an atrocious war of extermination rendered it unviable.

The Guáimaro Constitution was in effect until 15 March 1878.

On 1 July 1940, the delegates to the Constitutional Assembly that wrote and adopted a new Cuban Constitution in Havana, having completed their work on 8 June, assembled at the site where the Guáimaro Constitution had been adopted, a schoolhouse in Guáimaro, and signed their document on the same table used in 1869.

== See also ==
- Constitution of Cuba
- History of Cuba
