= Minas, Cuba =

Minas
- Municipality
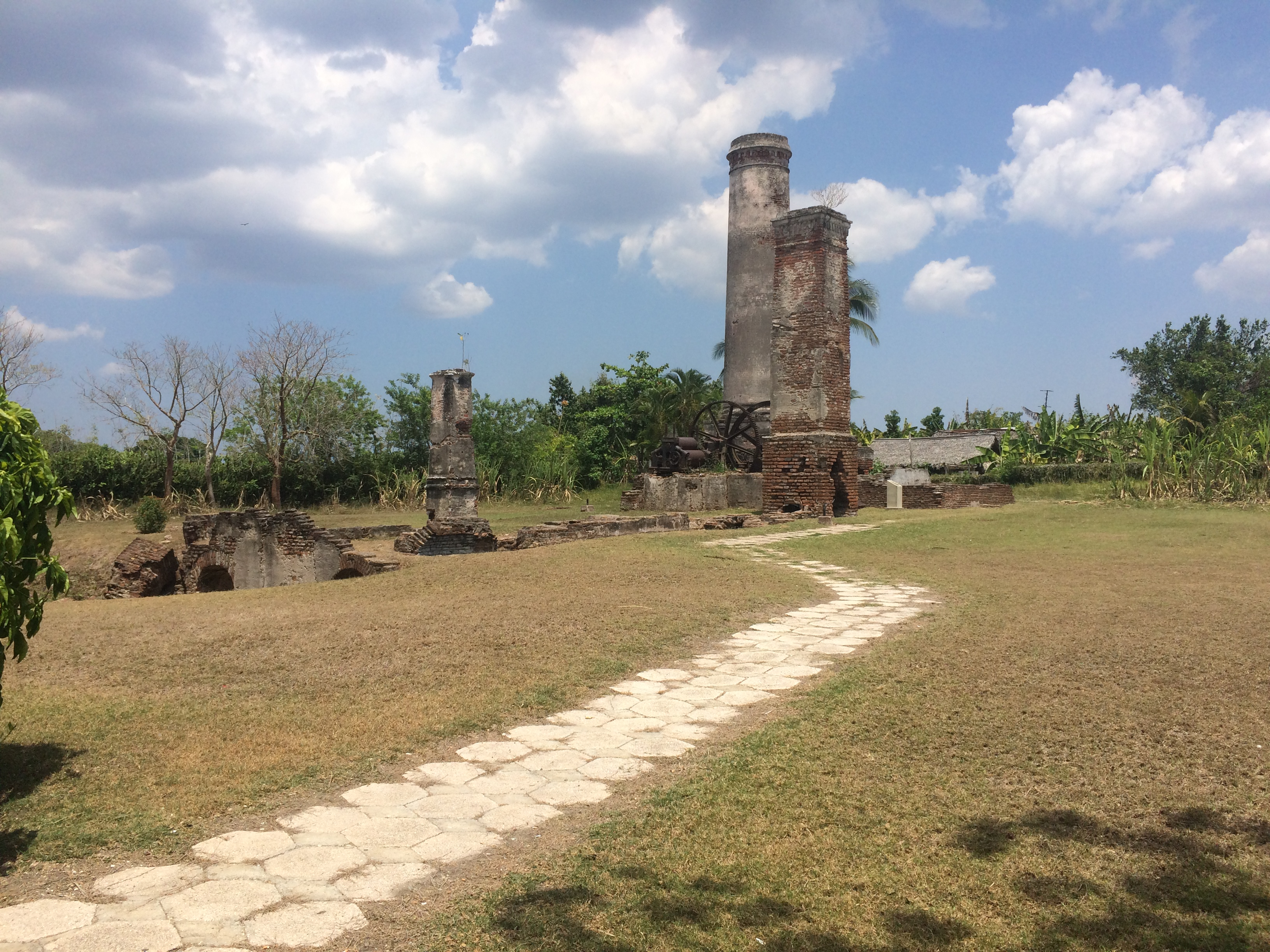
- Rests of an old mill

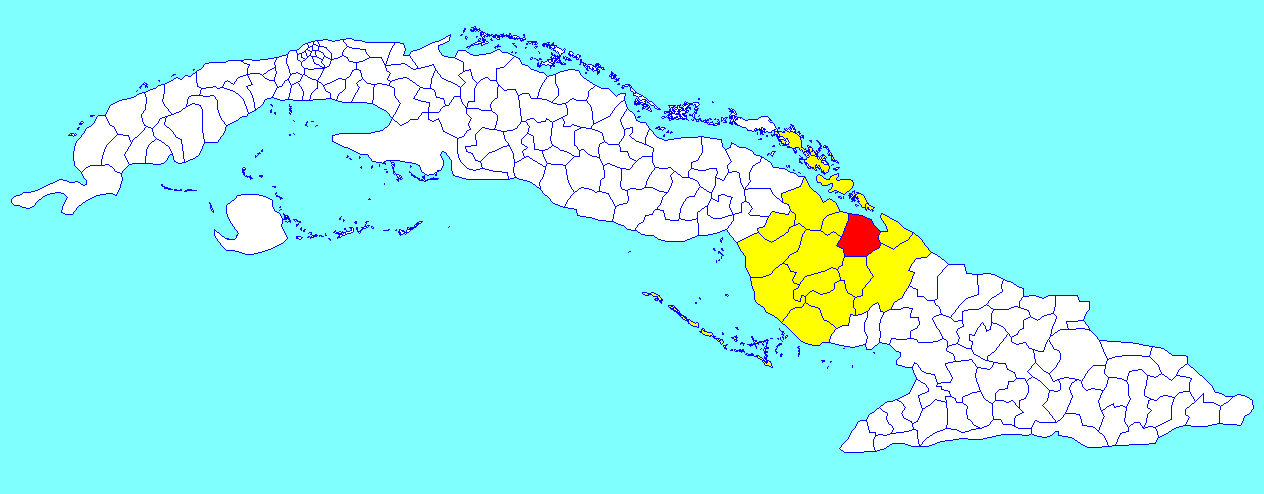
- Minas municipality (red) within Camagüey Province (yellow) and Cuba
- Coordinates: 21°29′22″N 77°36′18″W
- Country: Cuba
- Province: Camagüey

Area
  - Total: 1,015 km^{2} (392 sq mi)
- Elevation: 70 m (230 ft)

Population (2022)
  - Total: 35,966
  - Density: 35.43/km^{2} (91.77/sq mi)
- Time zone: UTC-5 (EST)
- Area code: +53-322
- Climate: Aw

Minas is a municipality and town in the Camagüey Province of Cuba.

== Geography ==
The municipality borders with Sierra de Cubitas, Camagüey, Sibanicú, Guáimaro and Nuevitas. Its territory includes the villages of Anguila, Fomento, Gurugú, Las Piedras, Lugareño, Monte Oscuro, Redención and Senado.

== Demographics ==
In 2022, the municipality of Minas had a population of 35,966. With a total area of 1,015 km^{2} (392 sq mi), it has a population density of 35/km^{2} (91/sq mi).

== See also ==
- Minas Municipal Museum
- List of cities in Cuba
- Municipalities of Cuba
