= Ten Years' War =

1868–1878 Cuban uprising against Spanish rule

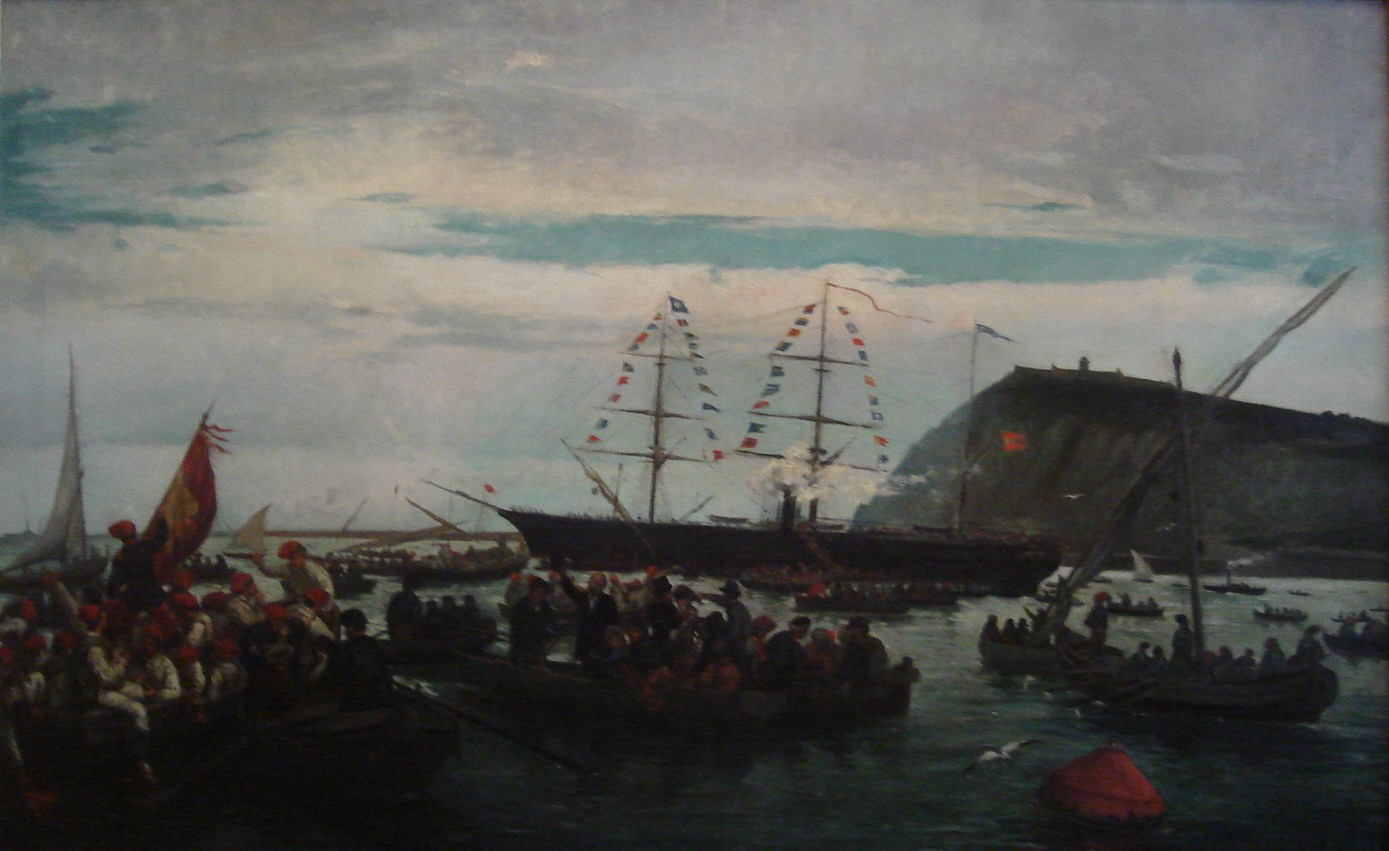
- Embarkation of the Catalan Volunteers from the Port of Barcelona by Ramón Padró y Pedret
Date	10 October 1868 – 28 May 1878 (9 years, 7 months, 2 weeks and 4 days)
Location	Cuba
Result	Pact of Zanjón

Belligerents
Republic of Cuba in Arms; Cuban Liberation Army	Spanish Empire: Captaincy General of Cuba

Commanders and leaders
Carlos M. de Céspedes †; Salvador Cisneros Betancourt; Juan Bautista Spotorno; Tomás Estrada Palma (POW); Francisco Javier de Céspedes; Vicente García González; Titá Calvar; Domingo Méndez Capote; Manuel de Quesada; Ignacio Agramonte †; Carlos Roloff; Ángel del Castillo †; Honorato del Castillo †; Miguel J. Gutiérrez †; Calixto García (POW); Antonio Maceo; Perucho Figueredo †; Francisco V. Aguilera †; Donato Mármol †; Máximo Gómez; Luis Marcano †; Modesto Díaz; Thomas Jordan; Henry Reeve †	Francisco Lersundi Hormaechea; Domingo Dulce; Blas Villate; Felipe Ginovés; Antonio Caballero; Francisco Ceballos; Cándido Pieltaín; Joaquín Jovellar; José Gutiérrez; Camilo Polavieja; Arsenio Campos; Valeriano Weyler; Eusebio Puello

Strength
10,000–20,000 (1869); 10,000–12,000 (1873); 8,000+ (1878)	181,000 (mobilized throughout the war); 30,000 (1868); 40,000 (late 1869); 55,000 (1870); 30,000 (1875)

Casualties and losses
50,000 dead	81,248 dead (7,000 killed in action, 75,000 died from disease)

The Ten Years' War (Spanish: Guerra de los Diez Años; 1868–1878), also known as the Great War (Guerra Grande) and the War of '68, was a war of independence of Cuba from Spain. The uprising was led by Cuban-born planters and other wealthy natives. On 10 October 1868, sugar mill owner Carlos Manuel de Céspedes and his followers proclaimed independence, beginning the conflict. This was the first of three liberation wars that Cuba fought against Spain, the other two being the Little War (1879–1880) and the Cuban War of Independence (1895–1898). The final three months of the last conflict escalated with United States involvement, leading to the Spanish–American War.

== Background ==
=== Slavery ===
The Cuban bourgeoisie demanded fundamental social and economic reforms from the Spanish Crown. Lax enforcement of the slave trade ban had resulted in a dramatic increase in imports of Africans, estimated at 90,000 slaves from 1856 to 1860. This occurred despite a strong abolitionist movement on the island, and rising costs among the slave-holding planters in the east. New technologies and farming techniques made large numbers of slaves unnecessary and prohibitively expensive. In the economic crisis of 1857 many businesses failed, including many sugar plantations and sugar refineries. The abolitionist cause gained strength, favoring a gradual emancipation of slaves with financial compensation from the government for slaveholders. Additionally, some planters preferred hiring Chinese immigrants as indentured workers and in anticipation of ending slavery. Before the 1870s, more than 125,000 were sent to Cuba.

In May 1865, Cuban criollo elites placed four demands upon the Spanish Parliament: tariff reform, political representation in Parliament, judicial equality for all Spaniards (including Cubans), and full enforcement of the slave trade ban.

=== Colonial policies ===
The Spanish Parliament at the time was changing; gaining much influence were reactionary, traditionalist politicians who intended to eliminate all liberal reforms. The power of military tribunals was increased; the colonial government imposed a six percent tax increase on the Cuban planters and businesses. Additionally, all political opposition and the press were silenced. Dissatisfaction in Cuba spread on a massive scale as the mechanisms to express it were restricted. This discontent was particularly felt by the powerful planters and hacienda owners in Eastern Cuba.

The failure of the latest efforts by the reformist movements, the demise of the "Information Board," and another economic crisis in 1866/67 heightened social tensions on the island. The colonial administration continued to make huge profits which were not re-invested in the island for the benefit of its residents. It funded military expenditures (44% of the revenue), colonial government's expenses (41%), and sent some money to the Spanish colony of Fernando Po (12%). The European Spaniards (known as peninsulares) concentrated a good deal of the island's wealth through their paramount role in Cuban trade. In addition, the Cuban-born population still had no political rights and no representation in Parliament. Objections to these conditions sparked the first serious independence movement, especially in the eastern part of the island.

=== Revolutionary conspiracy ===
In July 1867, the "Revolutionary Committee of Bayamo" was founded under the leadership of Cuba's wealthiest plantation owner, Francisco Vicente Aguilera. The conspiracy rapidly spread to Oriente's larger towns, most of all Manzanillo, where Carlos Manuel de Céspedes became the main protagonist of the uprising in 1868. Originally from Bayamo, Céspedes owned an estate and sugar mill known as La Demajagua. The Spanish, aware of Céspedes' anti-colonial intransigence, tried to force him into submission by imprisoning his son Oscar. Céspedes refused to negotiate and Oscar was executed.

== History ==
=== Cry of Yara uprising and the 10th of October Manifesto ===
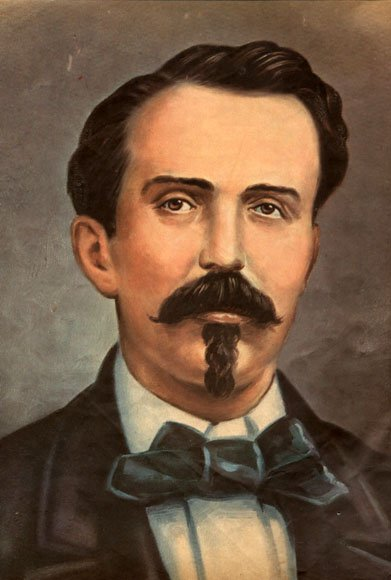
Carlos Manuel de Céspedes

Céspedes and his followers had planned the uprising to begin 14 October, but it had to be moved up four days earlier, because the Spaniards had discovered their plan of revolt. In the early morning of 10 October, Céspedes issued the cry of independence, the "10th of October Manifesto" at La Demajagua, which signaled the start of an all-out military uprising against Spanish rule in Cuba. Céspedes freed his slaves and asked them to join the struggle. 10 October is now commemorated in Cuba as a national holiday called the Cry of Yara (Spanish: Grito de Yara).

Digital reconstruction of a rebel flag flown in December of 1868(based off description)

Carlos Manuel de Céspedes called on men of all races to join the fight for freedom. He raised the new flag of an independent Cuba, and rang the Bell of La Demajagua to celebrate his proclamation from the steps of the sugar mill of the manifesto signed by him and 15 others. It cataloged Spain's mistreatment of Cuba and then expressed the movement's aims:

Our aim is to enjoy the benefits of freedom, for whose use, God created man. We sincerely profess a policy of brotherhood, tolerance, and justice, and to consider all men equal, and to not exclude anyone from these benefits, not even Spaniards, if they choose to remain and live peacefully among us.

Our aim is that the people participate in the creation of laws, and in the distribution and investment of the contributions.

Our aim is to abolish slavery and to compensate those deserving compensation. We seek freedom of assembly, freedom of the press and the freedom to bring back honest governance; and to honor and practice the inalienable rights of men, which is the foundations of the independence and the greatness of a people.

Our aim is to throw off the Spanish yoke, and to establish a free and independent nation….

When Cuba is free, it will have a constitutional government created in an enlightened manner.

During the first few days, the uprising almost failed: Céspedes intended to occupy the nearby town of Yara on 11 October. In spite of this initial setback, the uprising of Yara was supported in various regions of the Oriente province, and the independence movement continued to spread throughout the eastern region of Cuba. On 13 October, the rebels took eight towns in the province that favoured the insurgency and acquisition of arms. By October's end, the insurrection had enlisted some 12,000 volunteers.

=== Military responses ===
That same month, Máximo Gómez taught the Cuban forces what would be their most lethal tactic: the machete charge. He was a former cavalry officer for the Spanish Army in the Dominican Republic. Forces were taught to combine use of firearms with machetes, for a double attack against the Spanish. When the Spaniards (following then-standard tactics) formed a square, they were vulnerable to rifle fire from infantry under cover, and pistol and carbine fire from charging cavalry. In the event, as with the Haitian Revolution, the European forces suffered the most fatalities due to yellow fever because the Spanish-born troops had no acquired immunity to this endemic tropical disease of the island.

=== Escalation ===
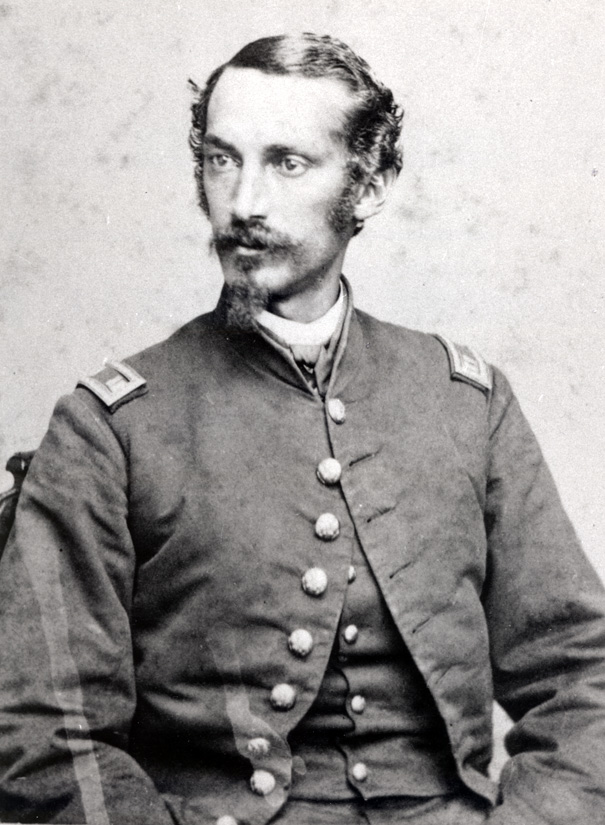
Col. Federico Fernández Cavada

After three days of combat, the rebels seized the important city of Bayamo. In the enthusiasm of this victory, poet and musician Perucho Figueredo composed Cuba's national anthem, "La Bayamesa”. The first government of the Republic in Arms, headed by Céspedes, was established in Bayamo. The city was retaken by the Spanish after 3 months on 12 January, but the fighting had burned it to the ground.

The war spread in Oriente: on 4 November 1868, Camagüey rose up in arms during the Las Clavellinas Uprising and, in early February 1869, Las Villas followed. The uprising was not supported in the westernmost provinces of Pinar del Río, Havana and Matanzas. With few exceptions (Vuelta Abajo), resistance was clandestine. A staunch supporter of the rebellion was José Martí who, at the age of 16, was detained and condemned to 16 years of hard labour. He was later deported to Spain. Eventually he developed as a leading Latin American intellectual and Cuba's foremost national hero, its primary architect of the 1895–98 Cuban War of Independence.

After some initial victories and defeats, in 1868 Céspedes replaced Gomez as head of the Cuban Army with United States General Thomas Jordan, a veteran of Confederate States Army in the American Civil War. He brought a well-equipped force, but General Jordan's reliance on regular tactics, although initially effective, left the families of Cuban rebels far too vulnerable to the "ethnic cleansing" tactics of the ruthless Blas Villate, Count of Valmaceda (also spelled Balmaceda). Valeriano Weyler, known as the "Butcher Weyler" in the 1895–1898 War, fought alongside the Count of Balmaceda.

After General Jordan resigned and returned to the US, Cespedes returned Máximo Gómez to his command. Gradually a new generation of skilled battle-tested Cuban commanders rose from the ranks, including Antonio Maceo Grajales, José Maceo, Calixto García, Vicente García González and Federico Fernández Cavada. Raised in the United States and with an American mother, Fernández Cavada had served as a colonel in the Union Army during the American Civil War. His brother Adolfo Fernández Cavada also joined the Cuban fighting for independence. On 4 April 1870, the senior Federico Fernández Cavada was named Commander-in-Chief of all the Cuban forces. Other war leaders of note fighting on the Cuban Mambí side included Donato Mármol, Luis Marcano-Alvarez, Carlos Roloff, Enrique Loret de Mola, Julio Sanguily, Domingo de Goicuría, Guillermo Moncada, Quintin Bandera, Benjamín Ramirez, and Julio Grave de Peralta.

Because of the escalating violence, after the first year of the war, around 100,000 Cubans fled the country. Generally speaking, those rich enough settled in Europe or else in northern cities in America like New York, Philadelphia, or Boston. Meanwhile, the poorer workers moved to south Florida, first settling in Key West, and then in Tampa.

=== Constitutional assembly ===
On 10 April 1869, a constitutional assembly took place in the town of Guáimaro. It was intended to provide the revolution with greater organizational and juridical unity, with representatives from the areas that had joined the uprising. The assembly discussed whether a centralized leadership should be in charge of both military and civilian affairs, or if there should be a separation between civilian government and military leadership, the latter being subordinate to the first. The overwhelming majority voted for the separation option. Céspedes was elected president of this assembly; and General Ignacio Agramonte y Loynáz and Antonio Zambrana, principal authors of the proposed Constitution, were elected secretaries. After completing its work, the Assembly reconstituted itself as the House of Representatives and the state's supreme power. They elected Salvador Cisneros Betancourt as president, Miguel Jerónimo Gutiérrez as vice president, and Agramonte and Zambrana as secretaries. Céspedes was elected on 12 April 1869, as the first president of the Republic in Arms and General Manuel de Quesada (who had fought in Mexico under Benito Juárez during the French invasion of that country), as Chief of the Armed Forces.

=== Spanish repressions ===
By early 1869, the Spanish authorities had failed to reach an agreement with the insurrection forces. Harsher measures to repress the insurrection and its supporters were taken, and troops began to flood in from the Peninsula.

Apart from the regular army, the government relied on the Voluntary Corps, a militia created in 1855 a few years earlier to face the announced invasion by John A. Quitman in collaboration with Ramón Pintó. By early-1869 more than 70,000 men, both peninsulares and creoles had joined the Volunteers. In the big cities, the Volunteers were used to keep public order in the cities, earning some notoriety for their lack of discipline and harsh acts of repression against independence supporters. Its forces executed eight students from the University of Havana on 27 November 1871. The corps seized the steamship Virginius in international waters on 31 October 1873. Starting on 4 November, its forces executed 53 persons, including the captain, most of the crew, and a number of Cuban insurgents on board. The serial executions were stopped only by the intervention of a British man-of-war under the command of Sir Lambton Lorraine.

Apart from their controversial role in the cities, hundreds of Volunteer units were created in the countryside. Most of the Volunteers there were Cubans loyal to Spain who organised sections and companies to defend their hometowns from rebel attacks, giving a tone of civil war to Cuba's first war of independence. According to a Spanish journalist, by 1872, 52,000 of the 80,000 Volunteers were Cuban-born.

In the so-called "Creciente de Valmaseda" incident, the corps captured farmers (Guajiros) and the families of Mambises, killing them immediately or sending them en masse to concentration camps on the island. The Mambises fought using guerrilla tactics and were more effective on the eastern side of the island than in the west, where they lacked supplies.

Another Voluntary Corps was formed by Germans, the so-called "Club des Alemanes". Presided by Fernando Heydrich, a committee of German merchants and landowners created a troop to defend their possessions in 1870. A neutral force initially, as ordered by Otto von Bismarck in a telegram to consul Luis Will, they were considered to favor the government.

=== Rebel political strife ===
Ignacio Agramonte was killed by a stray bullet on 11 May 1873, and was replaced in the command of the central troops by Máximo Gómez. Because of political and personal disagreements and Agramonte's death, the Assembly deposed Céspedes as president, replacing him with Cisneros. Agramonte had realized that his dream Constitution and government were ill-suited to the Cuban Republic in Arms, which was the reason he quit as secretary and assumed command of the Camaguey region. He became a supporter of Cespedes. Céspedes was later surprised and killed on 27 February 1874, by a swift-moving patrol of Spanish troops. The new Cuban government had left him with only one escort and denied permission to leave Cuba for the US, from where he intended to help prepare and send armed expeditions.

=== Continued warfare ===
Activities in the Ten Years' War peaked in the years 1872 and 1873, but after the deaths of Agramonte and Céspedes, Cuban operations were limited to the regions of Camagüey and Oriente. Gómez began an invasion of Western Cuba in 1875, but the vast majority of slaves and wealthy sugar producers in the region did not join the revolt. After his most trusted general, the American Henry Reeve, was killed in 1876, Gómez ended his campaign.

Spain's efforts to fight were hindered by the civil war (Third Carlist War) that broke out in Spain in 1872. When the civil war ended in 1876, the government sent more Spanish troops to Cuba, until they numbered more than 250,000. The severe Spanish measures weakened the liberation forces ruled by Cisneros. Neither side in the war was able to win a single concrete victory, let alone crush the opposing side to win the war, but in the long run Spain gained the upper hand.

=== Failing insurgency ===
The deep divisions among insurgents regarding their organisation of government and the military became more pronounced after the Assembly of Guáimaro, as resulting in the dismissal of Céspedes and Quesada in 1873. The Spanish exploited regional divisions, as well as fears that the slaves of Matanzas would break the weak existing balance between whites and blacks. The Spanish changed their policy towards the Mambises, offering amnesties and reforms.

The Mambises did not prevail for a variety of reasons: lack of organization and resources; lower participation by whites; internal racist sabotage (against Maceo and the goals of the Liberating Army); the inability to bring the war to the western provinces (Havana in particular); and opposition by the US government to Cuban independence. The US sold the latest weapons to Spain, but not to the Cuban rebels.

=== Peace negotiations and hold-outs ===
Tomás Estrada Palma succeeded Juan Bautista Spotorno as president of the Republic in Arms. Estrada Palma was captured by Spanish troops on 19 October 1877. As a result of successive misfortunes, on 8 February 1878, the constitutional organs of the Cuban government were dissolved; the remaining leaders among the insurgents started negotiating for peace in Zanjón, Puerto Príncipe.

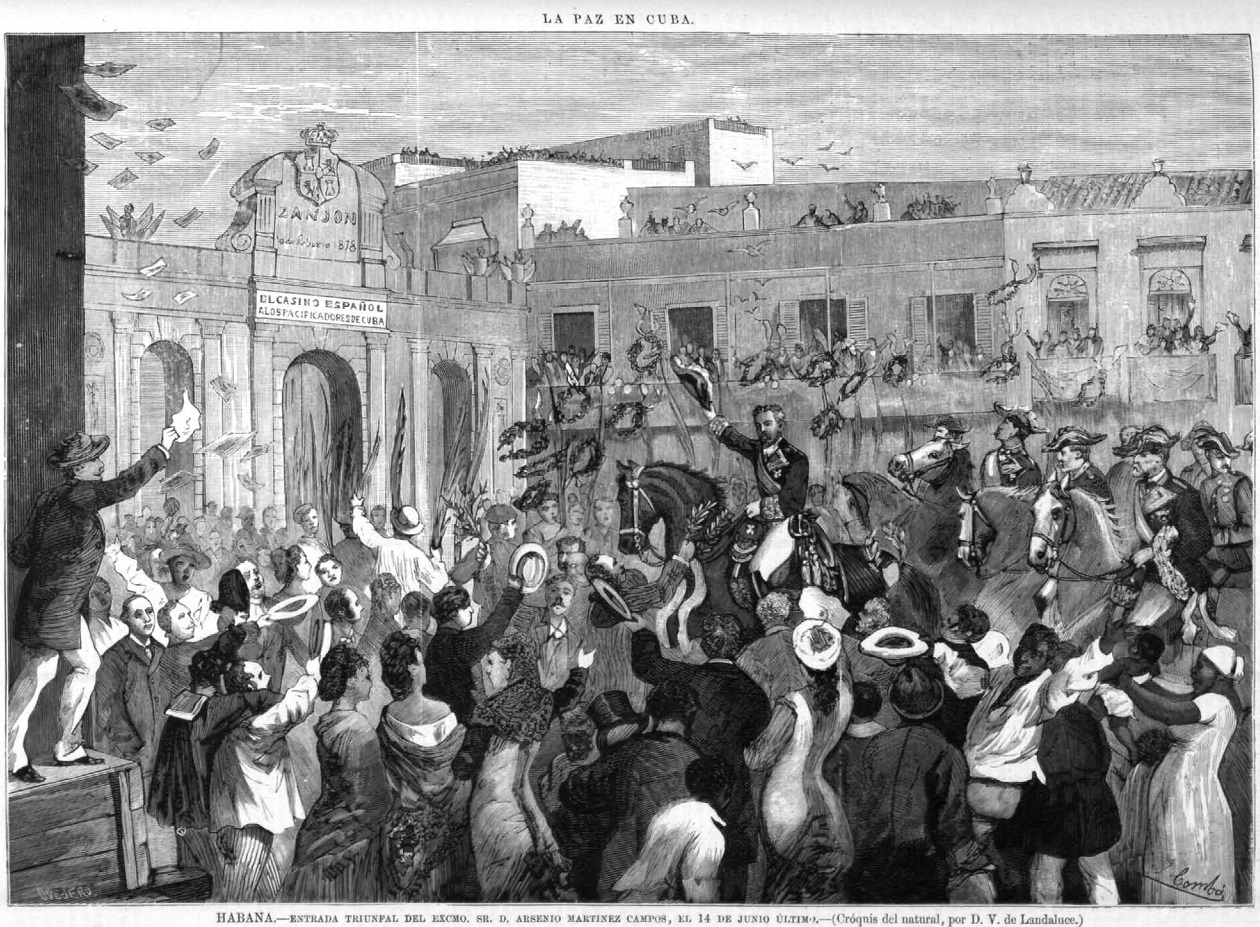
General Martínez-Campos in Havana, 1878

General Arsenio Martínez Campos, in charge of applying the new policy, arrived in Cuba. It took him nearly two years to convince most of the rebels to accept the Pact of Zanjón; it was signed on 10 February 1878, by a negotiating committee. The document contained most of the promises made by Spain. The Ten Years' War came to an end, except for the resistance of a small group in Oriente led by General Garcia and Antonio Maceo Grajales, who protested in Los Mangos de Baraguá on 15 March.

== Aftermath ==
=== Pact of Zanjón ===
Under the terms of the pact, a constitution and a provisional government was set up, but the revolutionary élan was gone. The provisional government convinced Maceo to give up, and with his surrender, the war ended on 28 May 1878. Many veterans of the Ten Years' War became leading figures in Cuba's War of Independence that started in 1895. These include the Maceo brothers, Maximo Gómez, Calixto Garcia and others.

The Pact of Zanjón promised various reforms to improve the financial situation for residents of Cuba. The most significant reform was the manumission of all slaves who had fought for Spain. Abolition of slavery had been proposed by the rebels, and many persons loyal to Spain also wanted to abolish it. Finally in 1880, the Spanish legislature abolished slavery in Cuba and other colonies in a form of gradual abolition. The law required slaves to continue to work for their masters for a number of years, in a kind of indentured servitude, but masters had to pay the slaves for their work. The wages were so low, however, that the freedmen could barely support themselves.

=== Remaining tensions ===
After the war ended, tensions between Cuban residents and the Spanish government continued for 17 years. This period, called "The Rewarding Truce", included the outbreak of the Little War (La Guerra Chiquita) between 1879 and 1880. Separatists in that conflict became supporters of José Martí, the most passionate of the rebels who chose exile over Spanish rule. Overall, about 190,000 people died in the conflict: 100,000 Cubans—including 40,000 guerrillas (25,000 of whom died from disease and repression) and 60,000 civilians—and 90,000 Spaniards, including 81,000 soldiers (54,000 from disease), 5,000 Cuban loyalists, 3,200 Spanish marines, and 1,700 Spanish sailors.

Together with a severe economic depression throughout the island, the war devastated the coffee industry, and American tariffs badly damaged Cuban exports.

=== Further legacy ===
Fidel Castro sought to frame the 26th of July Movement as a direct continuation of the anti-colonial struggle of the Ten Years' War and the War of Independence.

== See also ==
- Ana Betancourt – a female "Mambisa" who used the war to campaign for women's equality
- Cuban War of Independence
- Cuban Junta
- Francisco Gonzalo Marín
- History of Cuba
- José Semidei Rodríguez
- Juan Bautista Spotorno
- Juan Ríus Rivera
- Little War (Cuba)
- Presidency of Ulysses S. Grant#Cuban insurrection
- Rosa Castellanos
