= Blas Villate =

Spanish general

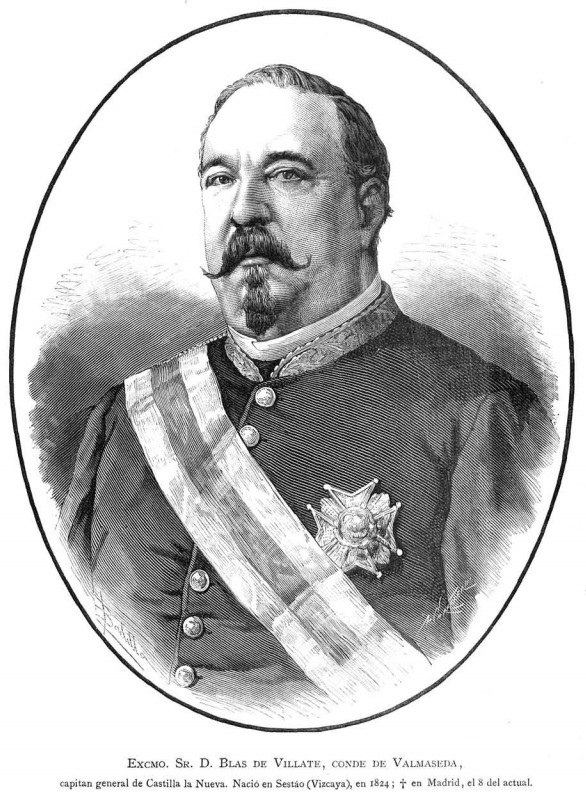
- Blas de Villate Portrait

Governor of Cuba
- Interim
- In office 24 September – 21 December 1867
- Monarch: Isabella II
- Prime Minister: Ramón María Narváez
- Minister of Overseas: Alejandro de Castro Casal; Carlos Marfori y Callejas
- Preceded by: Joaquín del Manzano
- Succeeded by: Francisco Lersundi y Hormaechea
- In office 13 December 1870 – 11 July 1872
- Monarch: Amadeo I
- Regent: Francisco Serrano
- Prime Minister: Juan Prim; Juan Bautista Topete (as interim); Francisco Serrano; Manuel Ruiz Zorrilla; José Malcampo; Práxedes Mateo Sagasta
- Minister of Overseas: Segismundo Moret; Adelardo López de Ayala; Tomás Mosquera; Víctor Balaguer; Juan Bautista Topete; Cristóbal Martín de Herrera; Eduardo Gasset y Artime
- Preceded by: Antonio Caballero y Fernández de Rodas
- Succeeded by: Francisco de Ceballos y Vargas
- In office 8 March 1875 – 18 January 1876
- Monarch: Alfonso XII
- Prime Minister: Antonio Cánovas del Castillo; Joaquín Jovellar y Soler
- Minister of Overseas: Adelardo López de Ayala
- Preceded by: Cayetano Figueroa y Garahondo
- Succeeded by: Joaquín Jovellar y Soler

Personal details
- Born: February 3, 1824 Sestao, Spain
- Died: January 8, 1882 (aged 57) Madrid, Spain
- Military career
- Allegiance: Spain
- Rank: General

Blas Villate y de la Herra, 2nd Count of Valmaseda (February 3, 1824, in Sestao – January 8, 1882, in Madrid) was a Spanish general. He was several times governor of Cuba:

- September 24, 1867 - December 21, 1867 (acting governor)
- December 13, 1870 - July 11, 1872
- March 8, 1875 - January 18, 1876
