= Ignacio Agramonte =

Cuban revolutionary (1841–1873)

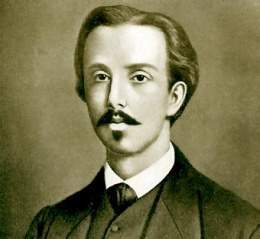
- Born: Ignacio Agramonte y Loynaz; December 23, 1841; Puerto Principe, Captaincy General of Cuba, Spanish Empire
- Died: May 11, 1873 (aged 31); Jimaguayú, Cuba
- Burial place: General Cemetery of Camagüey
- Military career
- Allegiance: Cuba
- Branch: Cuban Liberation Army
- Rank: Major General
- Conflicts: Ten Years' War; Battle of Bonilla

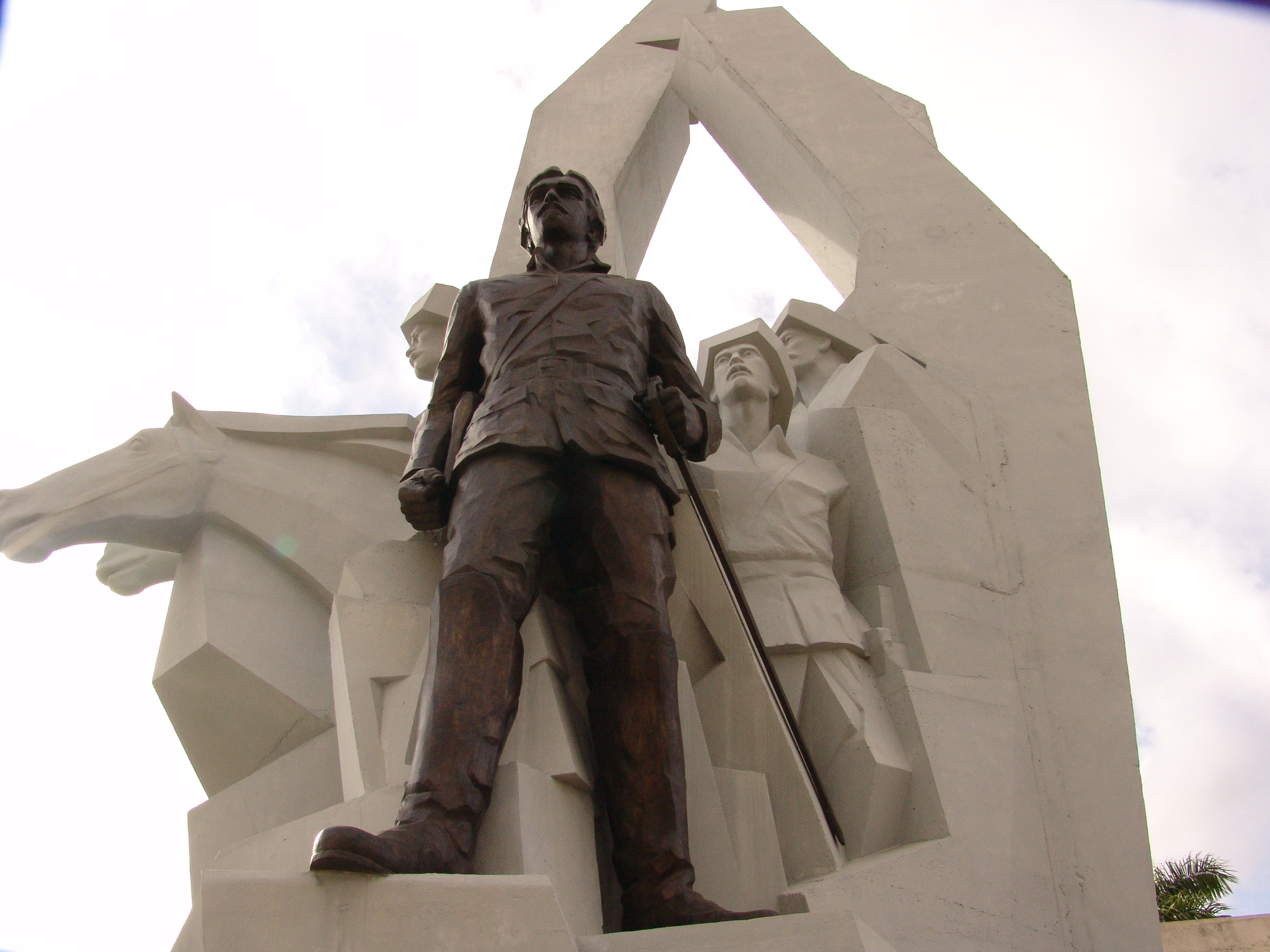
Statue of Ignacio Agramonte on the Plaza de Revolución in Camagüey

Ignacio Agramonte y Loynaz (23 December 1841 – 11 May 1873) was a Cuban revolutionary, who played an important part in the Ten Years' War (1868–1878).

== Biography ==
Born in Puerto del Príncipe (known as Camagüey) on December 23, 1841, to a wealthy family with roots in Navarre. His father, also named Ignacio Agramonte, had been appointed by the Spanish Crown councillor of the Puerto del Príncipe City Council. Ignacio Jr. studied law at the universities of Barcelona, Madrid, and Havana. On June 11, 1865, he graduated as a lawyer.

He returned to Puerto del Príncipe and married Amalia Simoni y Argilagos in August 1868, a woman who was the love of his life and whose family had considerably more wealth than his own.

Agramonte stood tall at 6'2". He had fine brown hair, pale skin, and was an expert horseman and fencer. He had a fine moustache and not thick or bushy like it appears in many portraits.

When the war of independence against Spain broke out on October 10, 1868, he played a pivotal role in the uprising of Camagüey which took place on November 4, 1868. Agramonte himself joined the war a week later, on November 11, 1868.

His wife followed him in the struggle, but was captured on May 26, 1870, while pregnant with her second child, who was born in the United States and never met his father.

Despite its privileged social position and his many ties to Spain, Agramonte became one of the most radicalized leaders in central Cuba. At a conference with other leaders who were trying to make amends with Spain, Agramonte made clear his opinion: "Stop at once all the lobbying, the awkward delays, and the humiliating demands: Cuba's only option is to gain its redemption by tearing itself from Spain through armed force."

In February 1869, he and Antonio Zambrana were elected secretaries of the rebel self-entitled Government of the center. He was subsequently elected a member and one of two secretaries of the Cuban Congress in Arms. He was among the five signatories of the act that abolished slavery in the area of Camagüey on February 26, 1869. Freed slaves who were physically fit were forced to join the rebel army, while those who were not were forced to keep working for their former owners, who in their turn were compensated for the loss of property. Agramonte was the driving force in the drafting of the Guáimaro Constitution (passed on April 10, 1869), the first constitution promulgated by Cuban rebel governments.

He resigned his secretarial and ministerial position within the Congress after Carlos Manuel de Céspedes was made president that same year because Agramonte had strong political disagreements with him. While Céspedes advocated for strong presidential powers, Agramonte defended a parliamentarian system.

He went on to become Major General of the Cuban forces for the military district of the province of Camagüey, where he organized cavalry troops of the Cuban rebel army. Showing vision, in spite of his lack of formal military training, his troops proved a huge challenge for the Spanish Army. Due to his fighting skills in battle and also his cruelty, he began to be known as "The Young Bolívar".

According to the press, on October 26, 1871, he executed six persons of his own forces whom he suspected wanted to give up and surrender to the Spanish authorities. One of them was a woman, wife to one of Agramonte's soldiers, whom he accused of trying to convince his husband to give up the fight.

Agramonte capped his impressive list of military achievements when, on October 8, 1871, he led a daring rescue. His commander, Julio Sanguily, was taken prisoner by more than 120 light cavalry while visiting a farm. Agramonte ordered 35 of his exhausted troops to mount up and track down the Spaniards. He personally led a furious charge, successfully rescuing Sanguily and routing the enemy troops, killing 11 and taking five prisoners. On May 7, 1873, he led a machete charge at Cocal del Olimpo against a column of around 100 Spanish soldiers (led by Cuban-born lieutenant colonel Leonardo Abril), of whom 47 were killed in combat.

Ignacio Agramonte was killed at the Battle of Jimaguayú on May 11, 1873, where he was struck on the head by a stray bullet. The Spanish soldiers stole his wallet and papers. When their officers realized who they had killed, they went back and took the body with them to the Puerto del Príncipe. His body was cremated by the Spanish authorities in Camagüey for fear that his troops would assault the city to recover the remnants of his body.

Brigadier General Henry Reeve, a volunteer from the U.S. and commander of his Cavalry Corps, nicknamed him "El Mayor", implying that Agramonte was the most skilled of all the Cuban Major Generals. Máximo Gómez succeeded him as Chief Military Commander of the military district of the province of Camagüey.

Agramonte used a Colt revolver, Navy model 1851, inlaid with ivory and gold. He used several machetes and sabres, and was carrying a sabre taken from a Spanish colonel at the time of his death. Most of his descendants lived in Camagüey until the early 1960s, when most of them went into exile as a result of the triumph of the Cuban Revolution.

== Legacy ==
Both the airport and the central park in Camagüey are named after him, and his statue is situated in the civic plaza. The equestrian statue of Agramonte in the park that bears his name was unveiled by his widow Amalia Simoni in 1912; it was the work of an Italian sculptor.

The Cuban village of Agramonte, located in Matanzas Province and part of the municipality of Jagüey Grande, was renamed after him. Its original name was Cuevitas.

His death in battle is the subject of the 1975 song "El Mayor" by Cuban nueva trova singer Silvio Rodríguez.

== Bibliography ==
- Carlos Márquez Sterling (1899). Agramonte. El Bayardo de la Revolución Cubana. Introducción de Ignacio Rasco. Miami, Florida: Editorial Cubana (1995 reprint).
- Fermín Peraza y Sarausa La Habana (1943). Ignacio Agramonte y Loynaz, (23/12/1841, 11/5/ 1873). Departamento de Cultura, Colección: Publicaciones de la Biblioteca Municipal de la Habana.
- Empresa Occidental de Geodesia y Cartografía (1989). Atlas biográfico Mayor General Ignacio Agramonte y Loynaz. La Habana: Instituto Cubano de Geodesia y Cartografía.
