= Guáimaro =

- Municipality
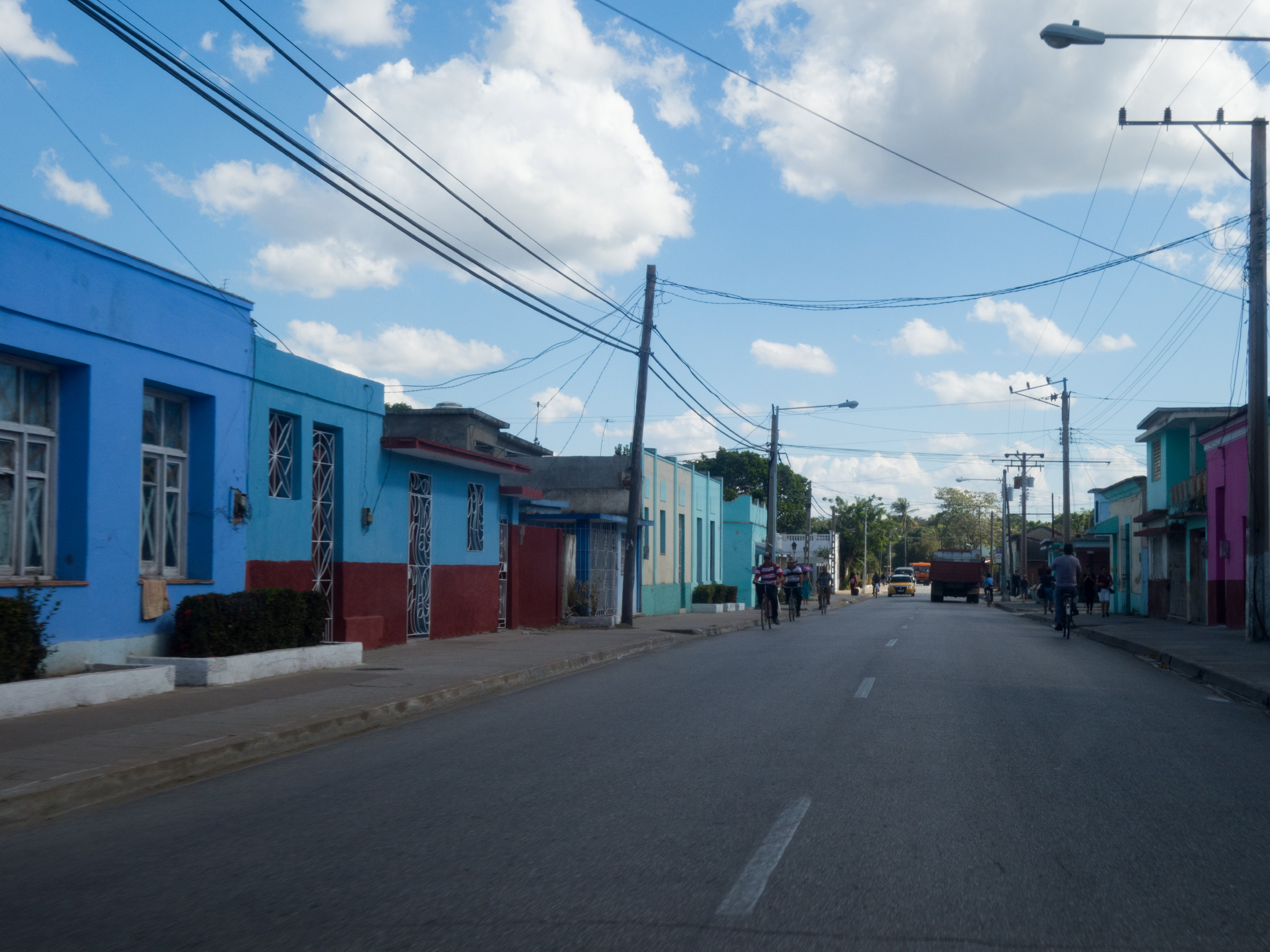
- Main street

- Coat of arms

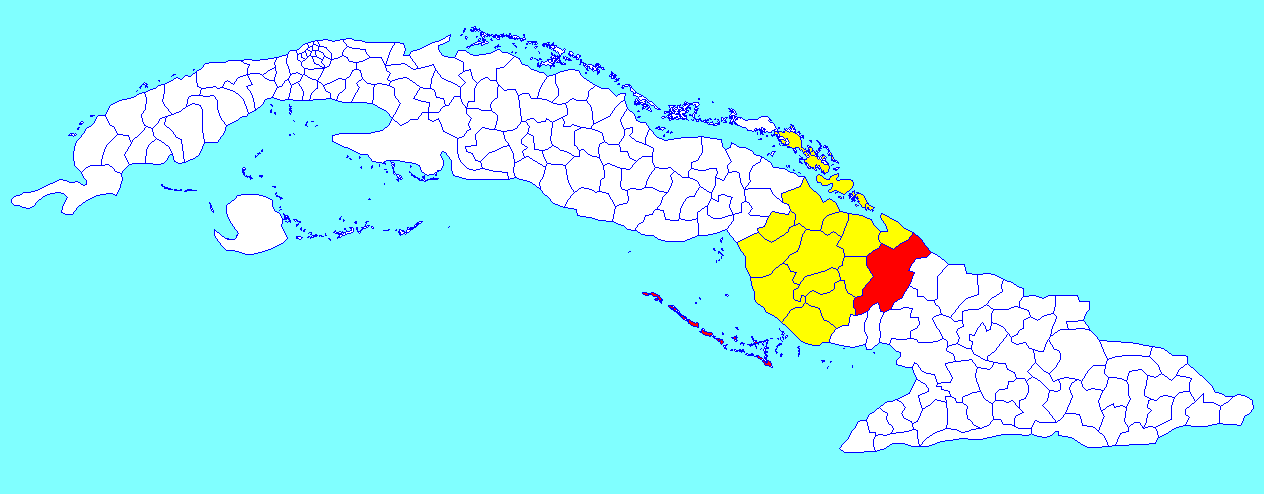
- Guáimaro municipality (red) within Camagüey Province (yellow) and Cuba
- Coordinates: 21°03′32″N 77°20′52″W
- Country: Cuba
- Province: Camagüey
- Established: 1924

Government
  - Vice-President: Rodney René Socarrás Bueno

Area
  - Total: 1,847 km^{2} (713 sq mi)
- Elevation: 80 m (260 ft)

Population (2022)
  - Total: 36,114
  - Density: 19.55/km^{2} (50.64/sq mi)
- Time zone: UTC-5 (EST)
- Area code: +53-322
- Climate: Aw

Guáimaro is a town and municipality in the southern part of Camagüey Province in Cuba. It is located between the cities of Camagüey and Las Tunas.

== History ==
Guáimaro features prominently in Cuban history as the place where in 1869, at the beginning of the Ten Years' War, the Revolutionary Army of Mambises met and created the Guáimaro Constitution for a new nation free from Spanish colonial oppression. The municipality was created in 1943, when it split from Camagüey.

== Geography ==
The municipality is divided into the barrios of Camaniguán, Elia, Galbis, Guáimaro, Palo Seco, Pilar and Tetuán.

== Demographics ==
In 2022, the municipality of Guáimaro had a population of 36,114. With a total area of 1,847 km^{2} (713 sq mi), it has a population density of 20/km^{2} (52/sq mi).

== See also ==
- Guáimaro Constitution
- Guáimaro Municipal Museum
- List of cities in Cuba
- Municipalities of Cuba
