= Camagüey Province =

Province of Cuba

Camagüey Province Provincia de Camagüey
- Province
- Coat of arms

- Camagüey Province located in the Map of Cuba
- Country: Cuba
- Capital: Camagüey
- Subdivisions: 16 municipalities

Government
  - Type: Provincial government
  - Governor: Jorge Enrique Sutil Sarabia

Area
  - Total: 15,413.82 km^{2} (5,951.31 sq mi)

Population (2022)
  - Total: 756,064
  - Density: 49.0510/km^{2} (127.042/sq mi)
- Demonym: Camagüeyans
- Time zone: UTC-5 (EST)
- Area code: +53-32
- HDI (2019): 0.760 high · 14th of 16
- Website: Portal Camagüey

Camagüey (Spanish pronunciation: [kamaˈ(ɣ)wej]) is the largest of the provinces of Cuba. Its capital is Camagüey. Other towns include Florida and Nuevitas.

== Geography ==
Camagüey is mostly low lying, with no major hills or mountain ranges passing through the province. Numerous large cays (including what used to be one of Fidel Castro's favourite fishing spots; the Archipiélago Jardines de la Reina) characterize the southern coasts, while the northern coast is lined by Jardines del Rey of the Sabana-Camagüey Archipelago.

Sandy beaches are found on both coasts also, and despite a large potential for tourism, the province has seen little development in that area with the exception of Santa Lucía beach, on the province's North coast.

== Economy ==
The economy of the Camagüey province is primarily cattle and sugar (in the north and south) farming, and the province is known for its cowboy culture, with rodeos frequently held. The capital city also has one of the few breweries on the island.

== Municipalities ==
| Municipality | Population (2022) | Area (km^{2}) | Location | Remarks |
|---|---|---|---|---|
| Camagüey | 333,251 | 1,106 | 21.38389°N 77.90722°W | Provincial capital |
| Carlos M. de Céspedes | 22,842 | 653 | 21.57694°N 78.27750°W | |
| Esmeralda | 29,203 | 1,480 | 21.85611°N 78.11111°W | |
| Florida | 69,174 | 1,800 | 21.52944°N 78.22250°W | |
| Guáimaro | 36,114 | 1,847 | 21.05889°N 77.34778°W | |
| Jimaguayú | 19,687 | 799 | 21.26667°N 77.83028°W | |
| Minas | 35,966 | 1,015 | 21.48944°N 77.60472°W | |
| Najasa | 14,732 | 921 | 21.08389°N 77.74694°W | |
| Nuevitas | 59,483 | 415 | 21.54028°N 77.26444°W | |
| Santa Cruz del Sur | 39,919 | 1,122 | 20.71944°N 77.99083°W | |
| Sibanicú | 28,930 | 736 | 21.23917°N 77.52083°W | |
| Sierra de Cubitas | 17,942 | 549 | 21.73306°N 77.77056°W | |
| Vertientes | 48,821 | 2,005 | 21.25722°N 78.14889°W | |

Source: Population from 2022 estimates. Area from 1976 municipal re-distribution.
