= Majagua =

Majagua may refer to:

== Locations ==
- Majagua, Cuba, a municipality in Ciego de Ávila Province, Cuba
- La Demajagua, Isle of Youth, a Cuban village on the Isle of Youth
- La Demajagua National Park, a National Park in Granma Province, Cuba
- Demajagua, Fajardo, Puerto Rico, a Barrio in Puerto Rico

== Flora ==
- Hampea reynae, a flowering plant species in the family Malvaceae endemic to El Salvador
- Hibiscus elatus, known typically as the blue mahoe or majó azul, is a species of flowering tree in the mallow family, Malvaceae, native to the islands of Cuba, Jamaica the US. Virgin Islands and Puerto Rico.

== Other uses ==
- La Demajagua (newspaper), a Cuban newspaper
- Bell of La Demajagua, the national bell of Cuba
