= Republic of Cuba in Arms =

Revolutionary pre-republican government of Cuba from 1868 to 1898

Republic of Cuba in Arms República de Cuba en Armas
- 1869–1878; 1895–1899
- Flags used Coat of arms

- Demonyms: Cubans; Mambises
- Government: Revolutionary republic
- President
  - 1869–1873: Carlos Manuel de Céspedes
  - 1897–1899: Bartolomé Masó
- Vice President
  - 1869–1873: Francisco Vicente Aguilera
  - 1897–1899: Domingo Méndez Capote

Independence from the Captaincy General of Cuba and the Spanish Empire
- History
  - Adoption of the Guáimaro Constitution: April 10, 1869
  - Pact of Zanjón: February 10, 1878
  - Jimaguayú Constitution: September 16, 1895
  - Creation of the Military Government of Cuba: January 1, 1899

Population
  - 1877 census: 1,509,291
Preceded by	Succeeded by
Captaincy General of Cuba	Military Government of Cuba
- Today part of: Cuba

The Republic of Cuba in Arms (Spanish: República de Cuba en Armas) was the government that occupied the revolutionary pre-republican era of Cuba that existed in two periods, the first period occurring during the Ten Years' War from 1868 to 1878, governed by the Guáimaro Constitution, and the second period, following the Little War, occurring during the Cuban War of Independence from 1895 to 1899, governed by the Jimaguayú Constitution. The first President of the Cuban Republic in Arms was Carlos Manuel de Céspedes. The first Vice President of the Republic in Arms was Francisco Vicente Aguilera.

== Tenure of President Carlos Manuel de Céspedes (1868–1873) ==
=== The Cry of Yara ===
On October 10, 1868, the Bell of La Demajagua was rung at the Demajagua farm, gathering the slaves and free men in the surrounding area to hear a proclamation of freedom by Carlos Manuel de Céspedes who was standing on the roof of the building. Carlos Manuel also freed his slaves.

On October 10, 1868, the Cuban Declaration of Independence was signed.

=== Adoption of the Guáimaro Constitution ===
In February, 1869, the Guáimaro Constitution was signed at the San Francisco estate, the home of Domingo Méndez Capote.

On April 10, 1869, despite internal divisions among separatist forces, the first Constitution of Cuba was adopted in Guaímaro. Drafted by Ignacio Agramonte and Antonio Zambrana, it established a parliamentary republic and enshrined key principles of governance and social equality.

Among its provisions, Article 24 declared that “all the inhabitants of the Republic are completely free,” reaffirming the abolition of slavery. This was reinforced by a law passed on March 10, 1870, which nullified coercive contracts imposed on Chinese immigrants, who had been subjected to exploitation. Additionally, Article 25 stated that all citizens of the Republic were to be considered soldiers of the Liberation Army, while Article 26 proclaimed the principle of equality, rejecting special privileges and titles of nobility.

On April 12, 1869, Carlos Manuel de Céspedes was elected President of the Republic in Arms by the Legislative Assembly, while Salvador Cisneros Betancourt, a political opponent of Céspedes, was appointed President of the House of Representatives. Manuel de Quesada y Loynaz was designated as Commander-in-Chief of the armed forces.

The Constitution of Guaímaro granted extensive powers to Parliament, including the authority to remove both the President and the Military Chief. However, Céspedes favored a strong executive power, arguing that swift decision-making was essential for military success. He viewed the establishment of a fully functional republic as secondary to securing independence through war, believing that the revolution required a centralized authority capable of responding quickly to military challenges.

In his official address to the Cuban people, Céspedes called for national unity, emphasizing the gravity of the revolutionary struggle:

"I am aware of the grave responsibility I assume in accepting the Presidency of our nascent Republic. I know that my modest strengths would not be enough if they were left on their own. But it won’t, and that belief fills me with faith in the future. In waging the struggle against the oppressor, Cuba has made a solemn pledge to gain independence or perish."

As President, Céspedes sought to expand the war across the entire island, transforming it into a truly national movement. He divided Cuba into four military regions: Oriente, Camagüey, Las Villas, and Occidente. Each region was overseen by a Lieutenant-General for military affairs and a civil governor for administrative control. These were further subdivided into districts, governed by Major Generals and Lieutenant Governors, and into prefectures and sub-prefectures, led by prefects and sub-prefects.

Céspedes also pursued economic warfare against Spain. On October 18, 1869, he issued a decree ordering the destruction of sugar cane fields, aiming to weaken Spanish economic interests in Cuba. Militarily, he adopted guerrilla warfare tactics, recognizing that the Spanish army had superior numbers and weaponry, while Cuban insurgents relied on captured enemy supplies and limited foreign support.

=== Diplomacy ===
At the diplomatic level, Carlos Manuel de Céspedes actively sought international recognition for the Cuban revolutionary movement and its status as a belligerent force. His efforts aimed to secure legitimacy and support from foreign governments, particularly in Latin America.

On April 5, 1869, Mexico, under Benito Juárez, became the first nation to officially recognize the Cuban revolutionaries, establishing a precedent of Mexican solidarity with Cuban independence struggles. Later that month, on April 30, Chile also recognized the revolutionaries as legitimate "belligerents," followed by;

- Venezuela, May 1869
- Peru and Bolivia, June 1869
- Brazil, July 1869
- Colombia.

Other Latin American states extended formal recognition in the following years. Among the American states, Colombia and Venezuela emerged as the strongest allies of the Cuban independence movement. In a letter to Francisco Sánchez Betancourt, a representative from Camagüey, Céspedes expressed his confidence in these two nations, noting that:

"With Colombia and Venezuela, we have two powerful auxiliaries on which we can count without reservation. A bill is currently being debated in Parliament to urge Spain to cede the island to the Cubans and to invite other South American republics to form an alliance guaranteeing Spain financial compensation in exchange for Cuban independence. In Venezuela, General Quesada has unrestricted access to all ports along its vast coastline and enjoys the full support of both the government and the people for his efforts on behalf of Cuba."

Despite these diplomatic successes, Céspedes lamented the lack of substantial material support from most of South America. In a letter to the Cuban House of Representatives on March 10, 1872, he acknowledged that aside from expressions of sympathy and some aid from Colombia and Venezuela, no significant assistance had materialized.

Céspedes held Venezuela in high regard, viewing it as the birthplace of Spanish America’s struggle for independence. In a letter dated August 10, 1871, addressed to José Ruperto Monagas, former President of Venezuela, Céspedes expressed admiration for the country’s revolutionary legacy:

"Venezuela, which paved the way for Spanish America’s independence and carried that struggle gloriously to victory at Ayacucho, is our illustrious master of freedom. It stands as the model of dignity, heroism, and perseverance that we Cubans constantly look to for inspiration. Bolívar remains the radiant star whose supernatural light still shines on the horizon of American liberty, illuminating for us the arduous path toward national regeneration."

=== Spanish response ===
In response to Cuba’s growing diplomatic efforts and international support, Madrid intensified its military and logistical efforts to crush the revolution. The Spanish government increased its deployment of troops and resources in an attempt to suppress the independence movement and prevent foreign intervention in the conflict.

Spain launched an all-out campaign to crush the Cuban independence movement, employing ruthless tactics to eliminate separatist forces. Under the command of Count Valmaseda, Spanish forces declared a war of extermination, imposing severe measures such as executing any man found outside his residence without justification and burning homes that did not display a white flag. In response, Carlos Manuel de Céspedes sought unity among the revolutionary ranks to withstand the onslaught, but political divisions weakened the movement. In December 1869, the Cuban House of Representatives removed Manuel de Quesada, a skilled military leader, from his post, sparking tensions between those who prioritized military pragmatism and those who insisted on adherence to constitutional governance. Quesada urged Céspedes to establish a dictatorship to ensure military effectiveness, but Céspedes categorically refused, committed to preserving the republic’s democratic principles.

Internal strife intensified when Major General Ignacio Agramonte resigned in April 1870 following a dispute with Céspedes, openly criticizing the leadership. Although Agramonte later reconciled with the movement, opposition factions within Congress sought to remove Céspedes from power, using relentless political maneuvers to undermine his authority. The President’s personal secretary, Carlos Pérez, lamented the growing hostility from Camagüey representatives, who actively discredited Céspedes amid an escalating war. At the same time, Spain dealt a devastating personal blow to Céspedes—his son, Oscar de Céspedes, was captured and executed after the President refused to surrender in exchange for his life. This sacrifice cemented Céspedes’ legacy, earning him the title “Father of the Homeland” among Cubans.

Despite his loss, Céspedes remained steadfast in his leadership, though his opponents continued their efforts to remove him. By late 1870, rumors of his impending impeachment circulated, but he maintained his composure, asserting that history would judge the true culprits of division. Meanwhile, Cuba continued to receive external support, particularly from Colombian volunteers, who landed on the island in early 1870 to join the fight. Céspedes expressed gratitude for their solidarity, pledging to treat them as brothers-in-arms. He also acknowledged the Colombian Senate’s resolutions in favor of the Cuban cause, recognizing them as a vital expression of continental support for the revolution. However, he remained acutely aware that the survival of the independence movement depended on resolving internal conflicts and ensuring discipline among revolutionary factions.

By 1871, Céspedes intensified his calls for unity, urging patriots abroad and military leaders to set aside their differences in favor of the greater cause. However, divisions persisted, and political intrigue weakened his administration. Frustrated by legislative restrictions that hampered his leadership, he offered to resign in June 1871, though his government convinced him to remain. He continued to inspire resistance, denouncing Spanish atrocities while calling on the Cuban people to persevere. Despite his dwindling political influence, Céspedes placed his hopes in the unwavering courage of commanders like Máximo Gómez and Antonio Maceo, believing that the revolution would ultimately triumph over Spain’s superior weaponry and brutality. However, with Spain’s relentless military pressure and Cuba’s dire shortage of arms and resources, the war for independence remained an uphill battle.

=== Downfall of the first President ===
Carlos Manuel de Céspedes, in his correspondence, articulated the Cuban War of Independence as a struggle for dignity and self-determination rather than a rejection of Spanish heritage. He viewed Cuba’s emancipation as a natural step in its development, necessitated by its unique conditions and progress. His presidency, however, was marked by internal strife, particularly opposition from Salvador Cisneros Betancourt, who sought to undermine him. Céspedes faced increasing challenges from within the revolutionary movement, including efforts to weaken his authority and ultimately remove him from power. Despite these obstacles, he remained committed to the rule of law and the ideals of independence, rejecting any descent into dictatorship or fratricidal conflict.

Following his ousting in 1873, Céspedes was politically isolated, deprived of the means to leave Cuba, and humiliated by his successors. Yet, he continued his dedication to Cuban independence, even as he spent his final days in exile in the Sierra Maestra, teaching local children. His death in 1874, resisting capture by Spanish forces, cemented his legacy as a martyr for Cuban freedom. His dismissal is widely regarded as a pivotal mistake that weakened the revolution, leading to its eventual failure in the Pact of Zanjón.

== Presidents in the remainder of the Ten Years' War (1873–1878) ==
After Carlos Manuel de Céspedes was removed as President of the Republic in Arms in 1873, the leadership of the Cuban independence movement continued to shift amid growing internal divisions and external pressures from Spain. Salvador Cisneros Betancourt assumed the presidency on October 27, 1873, following Céspedes’ ousting. However, his leadership struggled with maintaining unity among the revolutionary forces. While Cisneros worked to sustain the cause of Cuban independence, internal disputes worsened, leading to his replacement by Juan Bautista Spotorno in July 1875. Spotorno's presidency was marked by attempts to reorganize the government and sustain the war effort, but the ongoing internal strife and lack of resources led to his resignation in early 1876.

Following Spotorno’s departure, Tomás Estrada Palma took over as president on March 29, 1876. Estrada Palma, recognized for his diplomatic skills, sought to garner more international support for the Cuban cause, particularly from the United States. However, his presidency was short-lived, as he was captured by Spanish forces in 1877, which led to his exile. Estrada Palma's capture was a significant turning point for the Republic in Arms, marking a weakening of the revolutionary government.

Leadership then passed to Francisco Javier de Céspedes, the brother of Carlos Manuel de Céspedes, who served as president from October 19 to December 13, 1877. Francisco Javier de Céspedes’ tenure was brief, as the war had become increasingly unsustainable, and the Republic was losing momentum.

Following Francisco Javier de Céspedes's brief presidency, Vicente García González took over as president on December 13, 1877. Calvar's leadership occurred during the final months of the Ten Years' War, a period marked by severe challenges for the insurgents. The revolutionaries were unable to effectively resist the Spanish forces, and internal divisions, compounded by economic strain and diplomatic pressures, made it clear that peace negotiations were becoming necessary. González's presidency, though brief, symbolized the near collapse of the Republic in Arms as the war reached its final stages.

=== The Pact of Zanjón ===
Vicente García González was a Cuban revolutionary leader and military figure who served as the President of the Republic in Arms during the final months of the Ten Years' War. García González held office from December 1877 until February 1878, and his leadership marked the closing stages of the conflict. He was chosen to lead the Republic in Arms as the war was increasingly viewed as unsustainable, with Cuban insurgents facing mounting difficulties in their fight against Spanish colonial forces. His presidency came at a time when peace negotiations were becoming more imminent.

García González's time in office was short, and he was not able to significantly alter the course of the war. During his leadership, the situation for the insurgents had become critical. The Cuban rebels were losing momentum due to the harsh Spanish military response, a lack of resources, and internal divisions. As the war reached its final stages, it became evident that the revolutionaries could not continue the fight without greater external support, and García González’s presidency was largely overshadowed by the impending peace talks.

On February 10, 1878, García González’s term ended with the signing of the Pact of Zanjón, a peace agreement between the Cuban insurgents and Spain that effectively ended the Ten Years' War. The pact granted certain concessions, such as the abolition of slavery and a promise of reforms, though it did not provide Cuban independence, a primary goal of the revolutionaries.

=== Constitution of Baraguá ===
After the signing of the pact, the Spanish re-inserted control of Cuba, but their control did not last long before the signing of the Constitution of Baraguá, which was an attempt to re-ignite the war against Spain. The leadership of the Republic in Arms passed to Manuel de Jesús Calvar [ES], who assumed the presidency. García González's brief presidency marked the end of an era in the struggle for Cuban independence and the beginning of a new chapter in the relationship between Cuba and Spain.

== Cuban War of Independence (1895–1899) ==
José Martí, often regarded as an original proponent of Cuban independence, worked alongside Máximo Gómez y Báez, Antonio Maceo, and other veterans of the Ten Years' War to organize a new nationwide uprising. The Cuban Junta worked out of its headquarters in the Biltmore Hotel, in New York, to raise funds and armaments for the war.

On February 24, 1895, the struggle for liberation reignited with the Grito de Baire, marking the beginning of a renewed armed conflict. A month later, on March 24, Martí issued the Montecristi Manifesto, a foundational document laying out the goals and principles of the revolution. It emphasized racial unity in the fight for independence, stressing the essential participation of both Black and white Cubans. The manifesto also called for clemency toward non-hostile Spaniards, protection of private agricultural property, and the promise of economic rejuvenation for Cuba. In Martí’s own words, the Cuban people sought nothing more from the world than acknowledgment and respect for their sacrifices. Martí died in 1895, fanning the flames of the revolution.

=== Jimaguayú Constitution ===
On 16 September 1895, delegates from the five main military commands of the Liberation Army forces adopted a constitution in Jimaguayú, and set it to be reviewed in two years by a representative assembly. It described relations between civil and military authority. The Republic in Arms was re-established with the Constitution.

The constitution also established a Government Council (Consejo de Gobierno) with both legislative and executive powers, aiming to unify the civil and military leadership of the revolutionary movement. Salvador Cisneros Betancourt was re-appointed as President, with Bartolomé Masó as Vice President. The military command was entrusted to General-in-Chief Máximo Gómez and Lieutenant General Antonio Maceo, reflecting a strategic effort to balance political governance with military operations.

In the aftermath of the constitution's adoption, the revolutionary forces intensified their military campaigns against Spanish troops. Notably, the First Eastern Campaign, led by Generalissimo Máximo Gómez, resulted in several key victories, including the battles of Alta Gracia, La Ceja, and Cascorro. These successes bolstered the morale of the insurgents and facilitated the consolidation of Cuban control over significant territories. Concurrently, Antonio Maceo conducted operations in the western provinces, further expanding the influence of the revolutionary army.

Despite these military achievements, the Republic in Arms faced internal challenges, particularly concerning racial dynamics within its leadership. The provisional government established by the Jimaguayú Constitution was predominantly composed of white officials, with key positions such as the President, Vice President, and Secretaries held by white individuals. This composition underscored existing racial prejudices and tensions, as Afro-Cuban leaders like Antonio Maceo and Quintín Banderas were assigned subordinate roles despite their significant contributions to the independence movement.

By July 1895, Gómez and Maceo had issued directives aimed at crippling the colonial economy, instructing revolutionaries to halt all activities that could benefit the Spanish regime. With this shift, the war took on an economic dimension: the rebels began targeting Cuba’s major industries—particularly sugar production—by burning plantations and disrupting trade. Despite the severe material consequences, much of the population continued to back the insurgency. Ultimately, this scorched-earth strategy significantly weakened the Spanish colonial elite.

Although the Republic lacked control over stable territory, it functioned as a civil authority accompanying the Liberation Army across the countryside, issuing decrees, levying contributions, and maintaining correspondence to administer the revolution's political objectives. The 1895 Constitution had deliberately limited the power of the executive to prevent the over-centralization of authority, resulting in a republican system that depended heavily on consensus among civil and military leaders.

Throughout 1896, the Republic faced substantial challenges in asserting effective governance, largely due to the nomadic nature of its institutions and the strains of wartime administration. The Council of Government, the Republic’s executive and legislative body, operated in the field, relocating frequently to remain near military zones yet retain autonomy from commanding generals. Efforts were made to maintain diplomatic communications, especially with Cuban exile communities in the United States and the broader international public, with the aim of garnering sympathy and material support for the independence cause. Financial administration was especially difficult; without access to a central treasury, the Republic relied on levies, donations, and the confiscation of Spanish property.

=== La Yaya Assembly and Constitution ===
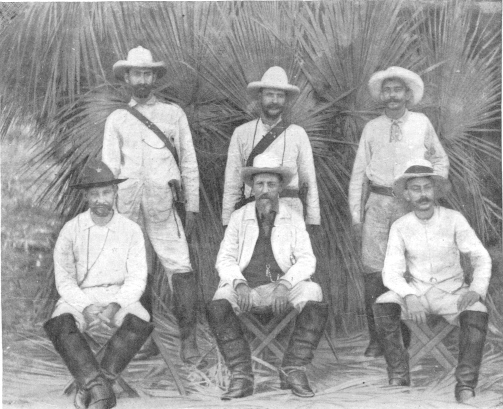
Executive government of the Cuban Republic in Arms. Ernesto Fons Sterling, Secretary of the Treasury; Vice-President Domingo Mendez Capote; Andrés Moreno de la Torre, Secretary of Foreign Affairs; President Bartolomé Masó; José B. Aleman, Secretary of War; Manuel Ramon Silva, Secretary of the Interior.

To address the ongoing challenges and adapt to the evolving circumstances of the war, the Jimaguayú Constitution included a provision for its reassessment after two years. Consequently, in September and October 1897, the La Yaya Assembly was convened in La Yaya, leading to the adoption of a new constitution. This updated framework expanded the powers of the Government Council, particularly in military affairs, and introduced a comprehensive bill of rights, reflecting the maturing political consciousness within the Cuban independence movement.

On October 30, the Assembly elected Bartolomé Masó as President, and Domingo Méndez Capote as his Vice President.

The war intensified. Masó's leadership was marked by efforts to consolidate the revolutionary forces and maintain the momentum of the independence movement against Spanish colonial authority. However, his tenure was relatively brief; the Spanish-American War in 1898 led to significant geopolitical shifts. The intervention of the United States resulted in the defeat of Spanish forces and the subsequent U.S. military occupation of Cuba.

=== The Assembly of Santa Cruz del Sur ===
By 1898, with Cuban rebel forces on the brink of total victory, the U.S. intervened militarily. Following the joint defeat of Spanish troops in Santiago de Cuba on July 16, 1898—primarily due to Cuban military advances and General García’s strategic leadership—Spanish General Toral surrendered to U.S. General William Shafter the next day. Notably, Cuban commanders were excluded from the surrender negotiations at the express insistence of American authorities.

This exclusion sparked a sharp protest from General Calixto García, who issued a formal letter of complaint to General Shafter and subsequently resigned from his command. García criticized what he viewed as the marginalization of Cuban leadership and the disrespect shown to Cuban soldiers who had fought for independence. Following this, the Peace Protocol was signed in Washington on August 12, 1898, between U.S. Secretary of State William R. Day and French Ambassador Jules Cambon, representing Spain. Cuban representatives were again absent and denied any observer status due to the U.S. government’s refusal to recognize the Republic in Arms or the legitimacy of the Cuban Liberation Army.

Subsequently, a Provisional Constitution was imposed in Santiago de Cuba on October 20, 1898, by U.S. military governor General Leonard Wood. It was enacted without consultation with Cuban civil or military authorities. As noted by legal scholar Antonio Barreras in Las Constituciones de Cuba, the so-called constitution was more akin to a military ordinance. Rights such as freedom of assembly, religion, property, and the inviolability of the home were subject to wartime restrictions and could be suspended at the discretion of the U.S. commanding general, including the right to habeas corpus.

Under these conditions, Cuba was, in effect, an occupied territory despite its protracted struggle for independence. In response, the Assembly of Representatives of Santa Cruz del Sur was convened on October 24, 1898. Its primary aims were:

1. To officially demobilize the Cuban Liberation Army;
2. To appoint a commission to represent Cuba before the U.S. government, thereby asserting a form of recognition for the Cuban revolutionary authority
3. To establish an executive commission in territories still under Cuban control.

In its second session, a resolution by Juan Gualberto Gómez and José Antonio González Lanuza proposed that the Assembly should oversee provisional governance and ratify any peace treaty with Spain, effectively claiming political sovereignty.

The Assembly symbolized a nationalistic affirmation of Cuban self-determination and a rejection of foreign control. However, its aspirations clashed with U.S. plans for the island. Prominent Cuban leaders such as Bartolomé Masó, then president of the Republic in Arms, and General Calixto García were perceived by U.S. authorities as too independent and resistant to external influence. Their popularity and national stature contributed to rising tensions with the American military government. Despite its aspirations, the Santa Cruz del Sur Assembly was ultimately unable to fulfill its objectives.

=== Assembly of Representatives of the Cuban Revolution ===
On November 10, 1898, the Assembly of Representatives of the Cuban Revolution, seeking to assert Cuban sovereignty, appointed Rafael María Portuondo Tamayo as President of the Executive Council. Portuondo Tamayo, a seasoned revolutionary who had participated in the earlier Ten Years' War and played a pivotal role in the 1895 uprising, was tasked with navigating the complex political landscape during this transitional period.

Portuondo Tamayo's tenure was marked by efforts to maintain the authority of the Cuban revolutionary government while contending with the realities of foreign military presence. His administration focused on diplomatic engagements and internal consolidation, aiming to preserve the gains of the independence movement. However, the overarching influence of the U.S. military government, which had been installed on January 1, 1899, posed continuous obstacles to the full realization of Cuban self-governance.

On April 4, 1899, José Lacret Morlot succeeded Portuondo Tamayo as President of the Executive Council. Lacret Morlot, also a veteran of the Ten Years' War and a close associate of General Antonio Maceo, brought extensive military and political experience to the role. His leadership coincided with the dissolution of the Representative Assembly on April 4, 1899, which had been the civil authority of the revolution but lost confidence after attempting to dismiss General Máximo Gómez from his position.

During Lacret Morlot's presidency, the Cuban leadership grappled with the challenges of demobilizing the Liberation Army and transitioning to a peacetime government structure. The U.S. military government, under leaders such as General Leonard Wood, implemented policies that often sidelined Cuban authorities, leading to tensions between the occupying forces and Cuban patriots who had fought for independence. Despite these challenges, Lacret Morlot endeavored to assert Cuban agency in the face of foreign intervention.

== See also ==
- Vice President of Cuba
- List of heads of state of Cuba
- Cuban Liberation Army
- Cuban naval jack
