= Napoleón Arango =

Cuban army general

- Born: Napoleón Arango y Agüero; Puerto Príncipe, Captaincy General of Cuba, Spanish Empire
- Relatives: Augusto Arango
- Military career
- Allegiance: Cuba; Spain
- Branch: Cuban Liberation Army; Spanish Army
- Commands: Camagüey Province
- Conflicts: Ten Years' War; Las Clavellinas Uprising

Napoleón Arango was a Cuban plantation owner and mambí officer who defected to the Spanish Army during the Ten Years' War.

== Early life ==
Napoleón Arango y Agüero was born in Puerto Príncipe (now Camagüey), Spanish Cuba in the 19th century. He was the sibling of Cuban Patriot Augusto Arango.

Arango owned the El Destino plantation near Las Minas in the province of Camagüey.

== Ten Years' War ==
In the lead-up to Carlos Manuel de Céspedes' Cry of Yara in Eastern Cuba, Arango expressed doubts about their readiness to overcome the Spanish troops and showed reluctance toward the idea of freeing his slaves. Despite his objections, Arango involved himself in the Ten Years' War, the first major Cuban campaign against Spanish rule.

The Camagüey Province of Central Cuba joined the insurrection upon the Las Clavellinas Uprising. With Napoleón and Augusto Arango at the head of a squad, they forced a Spanish garrison, consisting of a lieutenant and 30 cavalrymen, to surrender on November 4, 1868, at San Miguel de Bagá near Nuevitas. Napoleón Arango, who tried to undermine the central department's efforts at a meeting at Las Clavellinas on November 18, was expelled from the ranks during a meeting in Las Minas on November 26, 1868. His counter-revolutionary proposals were opposed by the other leaders who voted to continue the armed fight against Spanish domination.

=== Augusto's Death ===
His brother Augusto Arango sustained his leadership of the mambises in the Camagüey region. In January 1869, Céspedes's attempt to negotiate terms through his brother Augusto was thwarted when Augusto, holding a safe-conduct, was treacherously killed at the town gate, leading Céspedes to end all further negotiations with the Spanish authorities.

In April 1869, Napoleón Arango and others opposed the appointment of Manuel de Quesada as General-in-Chief of the Liberation Army.

=== Defection ===
Soon after, he made an attempt to betray the Cubans to the Spanish troops but was arrested, tried for treason, and sentenced to death. Given his family's influential status and his brother's sacrifice for the cause, his sentence was reduced, though he was banned from returning to Cuba under threat of execution. He defected to the Spanish Army and had been living under their protection.

By February 1870, it was reported that Gen. Arango voluntarily surrendered to the authorities at Las Minas and that he vowed to confer with the Captain General Antonio Caballero y Fernández de Rodas on the best means of ending the insurrection without further bloodshed. Upon his surrender, he was placed in charge of the administration of goods confiscated from rebels in the province and persuaded to intervene with the island's peace negotiations. He pleaded with his former compatriots to surrender and follow his example. On March 28, 1870, Napoleon Arango published a manifesto titled The Cuban Rebellion, It's History, Government, Resources, Object, Hopes and Prospects: Address of General Napolean Arango to his Countrymen in Arms and stated his objections to the insurrection declared by Carlos Manuel de Céspedes.
