= Ana de Quesada y Loynaz =

Cuban revolutionary (1843–1910)

- Born: Ana Valentina de Quesada y Loynaz; 14 February 1843; Camagüey, Cuba
- Died: 22 December 1910 (aged 67); Paris
- Occupation: Revolutionary
- Spouse: Carlos Manuel de Céspedes
- Children: 3

Ana Valentina de Quesada y Loynaz (1843–1910) was a Cuban revolutionary and an important figure in the Cuban War of Independence. She became the second wife of Carlos Manuel de Céspedes y del Castillo, first president of Cuba. She was the mother of Carlos Manuel de Céspedes y Quesada, sixth president of Cuba.

== Biography ==
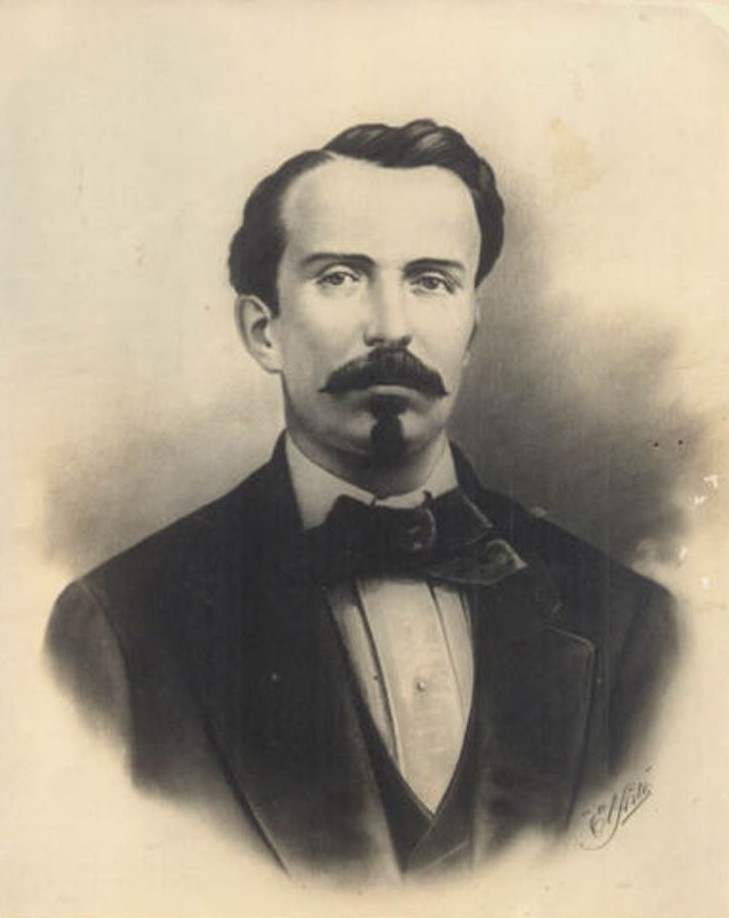
Ana's husband, Carlos Manuel de Céspedes y del Castillo.

Ana Valentina de Quesada Loynaz was born into a wealthy family in Camagüey in the city of Puerto Príncipe, on 14 February 1843. She was baptized in Our Lady of Solitude. Her parents were Pedro Manuel de Quesada y Quesada and María del Carmen Loynaz y Miranda. They had five children, including Manuel de Quesada y Loynaz, Ana's brother, who was appointed General in Chief of the Cuban Liberation Army.

The General invited Carlos Manuel de Céspedes del Castillo to a meal at his home to celebrate the Guáimaro Assembly. There, the future President (50 years old and a widower) fell in love with the General's young sister, Ana de Quesada, who was 26 years old.

A few months later, on 4 November 1869, they married in San Diego del Chorrillo, in the countryside of Free Cuba. (By his first wife, Carlos had had a son named Oscar, who had been killed by the Spanish.) In July 1870, Ana delivered a boy named Oscar after Carlos's son from his first marriage. Sadly, the younger Oscar died from exposure in the Cuban jungles while the family was pursued by the Spanish.

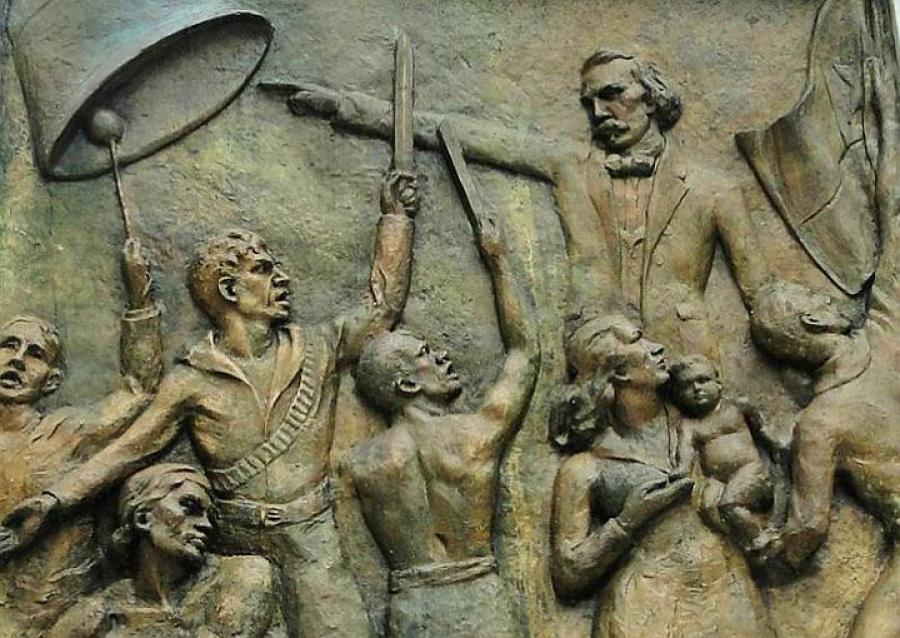
Plaque depicting the Cry of Yara at the base of the monument to Carlos Manuel de Céspedes y del Castillo in Céspedes Park, Santiago de Cuba.

=== Activism ===
Ana followed Carlos Manuel de Céspedes and helped him prepare for the battle called Cry of Yara. This battle on 10 October 1868 is considered the first declaration of Cuban independence, thus beginning the Ten Years' War. Soon afterwards, Ana and Carlos both participated in the Burning of Bayamo on 12 January 1869.

In October 1873, after difficulties arose in the Chamber of the Republic in Arms, the Assembly decided to remove Ana's husband from the presidency. Carlos requested a passport so that he could be reunited with his wife, who had already fled, and continue serving the Revolution from abroad. However, the Chamber did not grant this request, and Céspedes retired to a San Lorenzo hacienda, where he was killed on 27 February 1874 in a gunfight with colonial forces.

Meanwhile, Ana, heavily pregnant, had attempted to leave Cuba accompanied by the fugitive poet Juan Clemente Zenea, but the group was captured by the Spanish. Shortly thereafter, she was allowed to leave Havana for New York City where she gave birth to twins, Carlos Manuel de Céspedes y Quesada and Gloria de los Dolores de Céspedes y Quesada.

=== Exile ===
In her sorrow, Ana devoted herself entirely to preparing her son Carlos Manual to serve Cuba whenever the next war for the country's independence began. First, she sent him to the Andes Mountains, where a relative owned a beautiful estate, so the young man could prepare himself to face the dangers of the coming revolution. Then he moved to Paris with Ana. In 1895, Carlos Manuel travelled to Cuba, seeing it for the first time. He brought his mother along on the armed expedition. He went on to become the sixth president of Cuba.

=== Final years ===
Ana de Quesada died on 22 December 1910 in Paris.

Many letters that had been exchanged by Ana and her husband remain preserved. They were donated to the National Archives of Cuba by Alba de Céspedes, their granddaughter.
