= Manuel de Jesús Calvar =

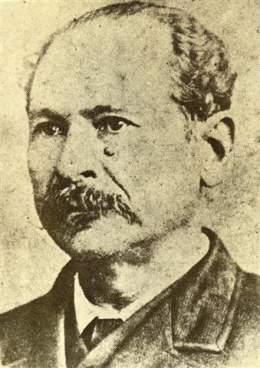

7th President of the Republic of Cuba in Arms
- In office March 16, 1878 – May 28, 1878
- Preceded by: Vicente García González
- Succeeded by: Salvador Cisneros Betancourt

Personal details
- Born: December 25, 1837; Manzanillo, Cuba
- Died: December 20, 1895 (Aged 57); Key West
- Nickname: Titá

Military service
- Rank: Major General
- Battles/wars: Ten Years' War

Manuel de Jesús Calvar y Oduardo, or simply "Titá," was a Cuban military leader and a prominent figure during the Ten Years’ War. He held the rank of major general in the Cuban Liberation Army and briefly served as president of the Cuban Republic in Arms.

== Early life ==
Titá Calvar was born into a prosperous landowning family in Manzanillo, located in eastern Cuba. Raised in a secure and privileged environment, he received his early education at a local private school. He later pursued higher studies in accounting in Germany, residing for a time in the cities of Hamburg and Bremen.

Upon returning to Cuba, Calvar became active in local civic and revolutionary movements. He played a role in establishing a Masonic lodge in his region, part of the Grand Lodge of Cuba, and supported the formation of a revolutionary committee in Bayamo on August 14, 1867.

== Ten Years' War ==
=== Cry of la Yara ===
Calvar played a continuous role in the Cuban independence movement and was closely associated with key political and military figures of the era, including Carlos Manuel de Céspedes and Antonio Maceo. He also contributed to the abolitionist efforts led by Carlos Manuel de Céspedes, aligning with the broader goals of Cuban independence.

Calvar first joined the Cuban insurrection on October 9, 1868, leading a contingent of 200 men to the Ingenio La Demajagua, where Céspedes had launched the call for independence. Throughout the war, Calvar rose through the ranks and became known for both his military leadership and political steadfastness. Notably, he opposed the controversial deposition of Céspedes as President in 1873 and reportedly made efforts to defend Céspedes in the days before his death at the hands of Spanish forces.

=== Protest of Baraguá ===
As the war for independence escalated, Calvar assumed significant responsibilities in coordinating military operations. Following the signing of the Pact of Zanjón on February 10, 1878, in Camagüey—a peace agreement that effectively ended hostilities without granting Cuban independence—a faction of insurgents led by Major General Antonio Maceo Grajales rejected the terms.

The Pact effectively dissolved the Republic in Arms, but Maceo, Calvar, and others were not satisfied with letting the Republic die. This rejection culminated in the Protest of Baraguá, held at Los Mangos de Baraguá in Oriente Province.

On March 15, 1878, Calvar stood beside Antonio Maceo in rejecting the terms of the Pact of Zanjón, which had ended hostilities without granting Cuban independence or abolishing slavery. According to contemporary accounts, including those of his secretary Fernando Figueredo, Calvar was outspoken in his rejection of the pact. When Spanish Captain General Arsenio Martínez Campos claimed that the terms had been accepted by the people of Camagüey, Calvar responded:

“We do not accept what was agreed in Camagüey, because that agreement does not contain any of the terms of our program—the independence and the abolition of slavery, for which we have sacrificed so much blood and so many lives. We will continue to fight until we are exhausted; anything else would be dishonor.”

During this protest, the dissenting leaders sought to continue the armed struggle and formed a provisional government as a continuation of the Republic in Arms. They created the Baraguá Constitution. On March 16, 1878, Titá Calvar was appointed President of this revived government.

Calvar’s presidency, however, was short-lived. The continuation of hostilities proved unsustainable, and on May 21, 1878, at a meeting held in Loma Pelada, in the jurisdiction of Santiago de Cuba, the leadership of the protest movement resolved to dissolve the provisional government. This decision marked the effective end of organized resistance, concluding a decade-long war for Cuban independence and ushering in a temporary peace under continued Spanish colonial rule.

On May 21, 1878, the provisional government of the Republic in Arms was dissolved after the realization that continued resistance was no longer viable. The Republic in Arms would not resurface for another two decades, with the beginning of the Cuban War of Independence.

== Exile and death ==
After the war, Calvar went into exile to avoid persecution by the Spanish.

On August 26, 1879, the former commander of his guard, Quintín Bandera, alongside Guillermon Moncada and Jose Maceo, initiated the Chiquita War.

Calvar eventually returned to Manzanillo, where he continued to promote Cuban nationalism. He financed and supported the publication of the newspaper El Liberal, directed by José Miró, which conducted an aggressive anti-colonial editorial campaign. Calvar remained active in Cuba’s independence movement until his death in exile in Key West on December 20, 1895.
