= Bell of La Demajagua =

National bell of Cuba

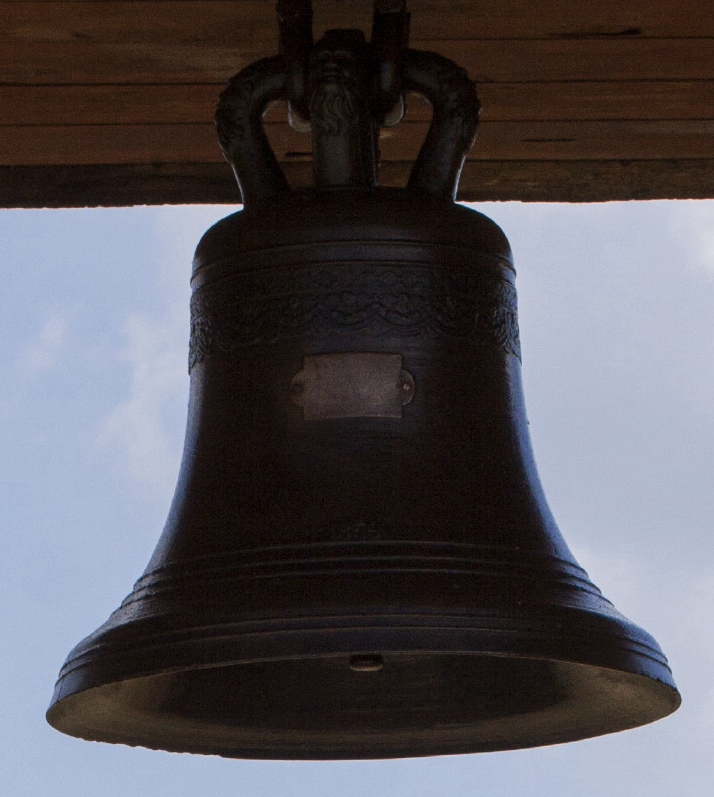
- Interactive map of Bell of La Demajagua
- Location: La Demajagua National Park; Cuba
- Coordinates: 20°17′1.37″N 77°10′34.53″W
- Fabricator: France
- Material: Bronze
- Height: 59 centimetres (23 in)
- Weight: 204.5 pounds (92.8 kg)
- Beginning date: 1857

The Bell of La Demajagua (Spanish: Campana de La Demajagua), also known as the "Cuban Liberty Bell," or the "Bell of the Fatherland," is the most iconic and symbolically charged bell in Cuban history. It is the former slave bell of the Demajagua plantation, owned by the family of Carlos Manuel de Céspedes and Francisco Javier de Céspedes, which was rung at the Cry of Yara, on October 10, 1868, to mark the official beginning of the Ten Years' War and the Republic of Cuba in Arms. It has been hung in ten locations throughout the history of Cuba, but today it hangs as the main feature of La Demajagua National Park.

== History ==
=== Use as a slave bell ===
The bell, measuring 59 centimeters in height and weighing 204.5 pounds, was cast in France in 1857. It was purchased to act as a slave bell and arrived at the Demajagua estate and hung at the La Demajagua sugar mill (located in what is now Granma Province) in 1860, during the ownership of Francisco Javier de Céspedes, brother of Carlos Manuel.

=== Cry of Yara ===
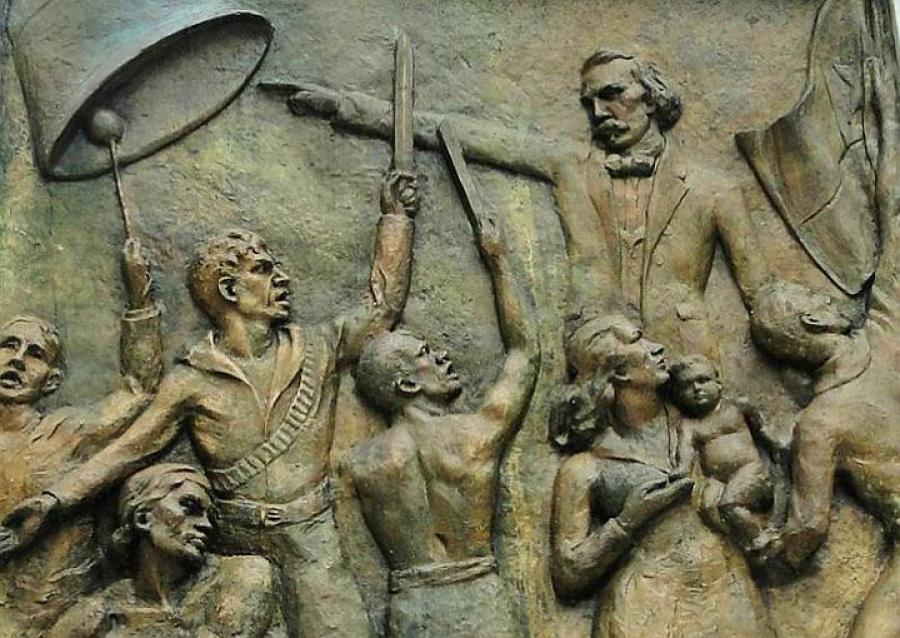
Plaque depicting the Cry of Yara at the base of the monument to Carlos Manuel de Céspedes in Céspedes Park. The Bell of La Demajagua is depicted being rung on the left of the image.

On the morning of October 10, 1868, Miguel García Pavón, a trusted associate of Céspedes, repeatedly struck the clapper against the bronze to summon both black and white Cubans in the surrounding area. That day, Carlos Manuel de Céspedes gathered his followers, freed his slaves, and declared: “Citizens, that sun you see rising over the Turquino summit comes to illuminate the first day of Cuba's freedom and independence...” This event came to be known as the Cry of Yara, marking the beginning of Cuba's Ten Years' War and the first "cry," (Spanish: grito) for Cuban independence.

=== Spanish bombardment and hiding the bell ===
Just a week later, on October 17, 1868, as Céspedes and his forces approached Bayamo to initiate its liberation, the Spanish naval gunboat Neptuno bombarded the La Demajagua estate. Spanish marines landed and razed what remained of the mill. The bell was buried in the rubble.

In 1869, the Spanish Crown executed a judicial seizure of the property, based on a mortgage Céspedes had with the firm Venecia Rodríguez y Compañía. An agent of the company, Fernando Palma y Forment, recovered remnants of the mill—including the bell—which he hid in the basement of the slave quarters at the nearby La Esperanza estate, in Caño Adentro, near Manzanillo. It remained there for over three decades.

=== Movement to the Manzanillo City Hall ===
On October 8, 1900, Palma turned the bell over to Modesto Arquímedes Tirado Avilés, a commander of the Cuban Liberation Army and first popularly elected mayor of Manzanillo. Two days later, Major General Bartolomé Masó Márquez unveiled the bell in a solemn ceremony at Manzanillo City Hall, placing it on a marble pedestal as a national relic. Later, the bell was installed atop the city hall's facade, where it was used as a timepiece to note the hours of the day.

The first known photographs of the bell and the ruins of La Demajagua were taken in 1900 by photojournalist José Gómez de la Carrera and published in Carteles magazine in 1947. Cuban families preserved images of the bell as patriotic keepsakes. The ruins of the sugar mill, with its iron gears tangled in the roots of young trees, became part of the visual iconography of Cuban independence.

The bell left Manzanillo for the first time in 1918 to commemorate the 50th anniversary of the uprising. It was guarded en route to Havana by veterans of the independence wars. President Mario García Menocal promised to establish a national park at La Demajagua—but this was never realized during his term. In response, Manzanillo's municipal government resolved never to allow the bell to be removed again unless a proper national memorial was built.

=== 1947 scandals and use as propaganda ===
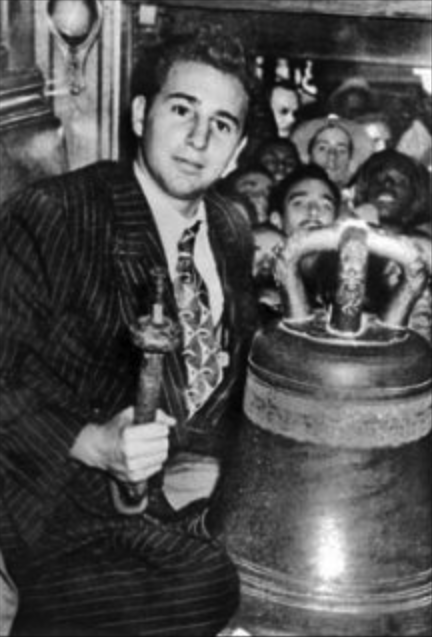
A young student named Fidel Castro escorts the Bell of La Demajagua to the University of Havana to protest the government of Cuban President Menocal.

In 1947, President Ramón Grau San Martín sought to feature the bell at the Havana celebration of the 79th anniversary of the Cry of Yara. His interior minister, Alejo Cossío del Pino, was sent to Manzanillo to request the bell. During a heated city council session, Councilman César Montejo allegedly rebuked the request, and is quoted as saying: "Thieves! The bell, no! They've taken everything—and now they want the bell. Where is the money for Manzanillo's needs? You will not take the bell, because what you would do with it is insult it."

Manzanillo did agree to lend the bell for the foundation of the University of Oriente on October 10, 1947.

The controversy inspired student activism. A 21-year-old Fidel Castro Ruz, then vice president of the University of Havana's law school student federation, proposed placing the bell on the university's steps to rally public protest against President Grau. Veteran leaders of the student organization agreed, and Castro, along with fellow student Leonel Gómez Prieto, traveled to retrieve it, traveling by train with the bell to Havana. On November 1, 1947, the bell arrived in Havana under heavy escort, received by students and workers, and was placed in the Hall of Martyrs at the university, wrapped in the Céspedes’ flag and guarded by students.

However, on November 6, before a planned demonstration, armed men stormed the premises and took the bell. Outrage swept the country. Manzanillo declared a general shutdown. Castro condemned the theft as “an outrage against the Republic's relic” and led a massive protest.

It was later revealed that Eufenio Fernández Larrea had taken the bell and hidden it in Vedado. It was eventually deposited at the home of General Enrique Loynaz del Castillo, who promptly returned it to the Presidential Palace. The government returned the bell to Manzanillo on November 12, 1947.

== La Demajagua National Park ==
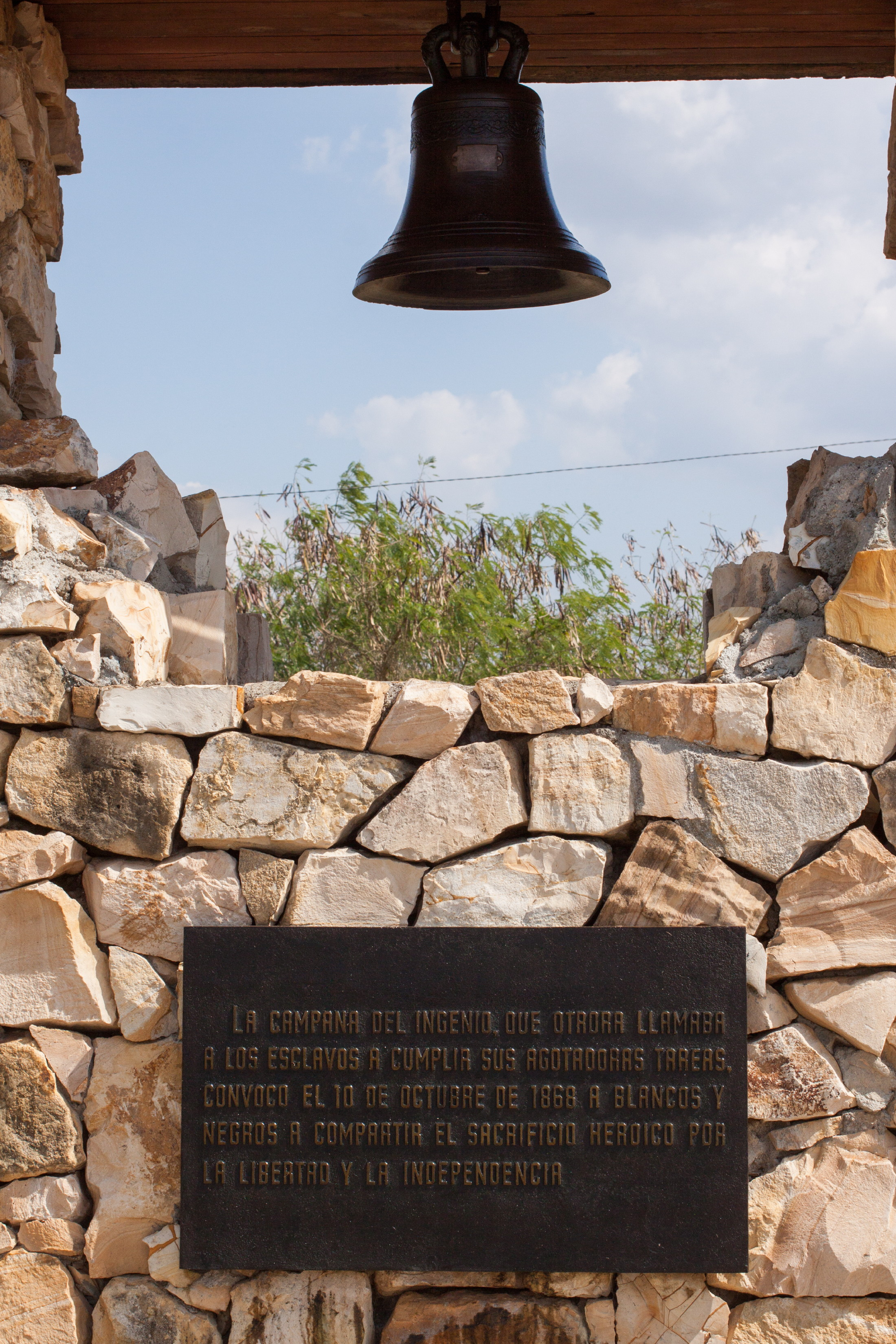
The Bell of La Demajagua hanging in La Demajagua National Park. 2010.

On October 10, 1968, for the centenary of the uprising, Fidel Castro inaugurated La Demajagua National Park. A monument designed by Santiago architect Fernando López was built on the site of the former mill. The bell was placed between the national flag and Céspedes’ original flag, in a permanent shrine of honor.

Since then, the bell has only been moved on authorized public occasions:

- March 30, 1987 – Taken to Havana for the 5th Congress of the Union of Young Communists (UJC).
- October 8–10, 1991 – Displayed at the 4th Congress of the Communist Party of Cuba in Santiago de Cuba.
- February 24, 1995 – Featured in the centennial session of the National Assembly commemorating the 1895 uprising.
- October 10, 2017 – Brought to the Santa Ifigenia Cemetery in Santiago de Cuba for the reburial of the remains of Céspedes and Mariana Grajales, symbolically placing them near José Martí and Fidel Castro. The bell was returned to La Demajagua a year later, on the 150th anniversary of the Cry of Yara.
