= Úrsula Céspedes =

Cuban poet

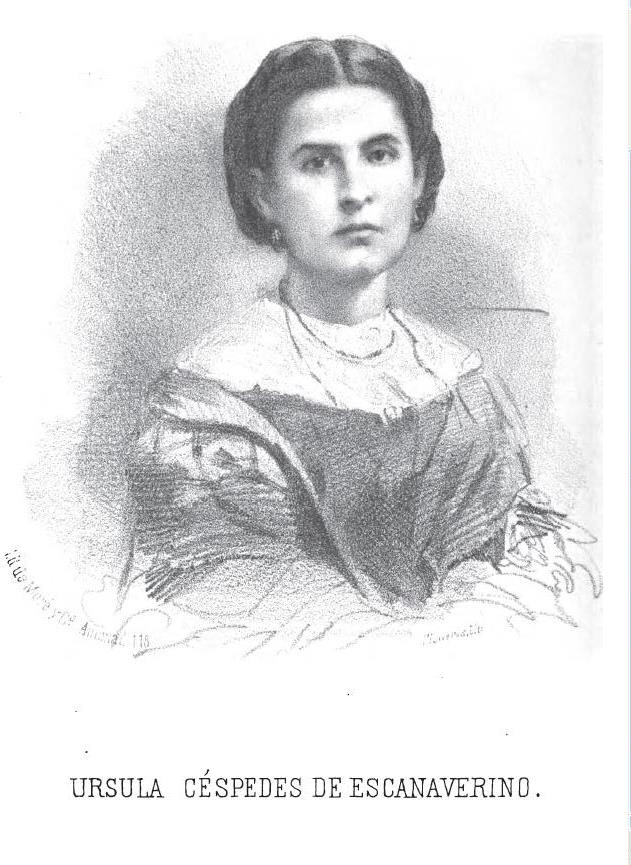
- Born: October 21, 1832; Hacienda La Soledad, Bayamo, Cuba
- Died: November 2, 1874 (aged 42); Santa Isabel de las Lajas, Cuba
- Occupation: Poet
- Writing career
- Language: Spanish

Úrsula Céspedes (October 21, 1832 – November 2, 1874) was a Cuban poet and founder of the Academia Santa Úrsula in Manzanillo, Cuba, originally from Bayamo, Cuba.

== Biography ==
Úrsula Céspedes was born October 21, 1832, in Hacienda La Soledad, close to the city of Bayamo in the eastern part of Cuba. She first received schooling in her own home where she learned music and French. In 1854, she visited Villa Clara, where she met Ginés Escanaverino, whom she married three years later. In 1858, she became a teacher. The same year she and her husband founded the Academia Santa Úrsula for women's schooling.

They moved to Havana in 1863, where they remained until 1865. Afterwards, her husband obtained the position of director for the secondary school for men in San Cristóbal, where Céspedes also taught classes for girls.

== Works ==
When Céspedes composed her first verses, she received the support of her distant relative Carlos Manuel de Céspedes, who declared Cuban independence in 1868, who also chose her first pseudonym: "La Calandria." During this period, Carlos Manuel was still living in Bayamo. She published her first poems in 1855 in Semanario Cubano and El Redactor in Santiago de Cuba, sometimes under the pseudonyms of "La Serrana" and Carlos Enrique Alba. She collaborated on "La Regeneración," published in Bayamo; "La Antorcha," in Manzanillo; "La Alborada" and "Eco de Villa Clara," in Santa Clara; "El Fomento" and "Hoja Económica," in Cienfuegos; "Corre de Trinidad" and "La Abeja," in Trinidad; "La Prensa" and "El Kaleidoscopio;" "La Idea" y "Cuba Literaria" in Havana; and "La Moda Elegante" in Cádiz, Spain.

In 1861, she published her book Ecos de la Selva with a prologue by Carlos Manuel de Céspedes in which he wrote, "Therefore, in spite of the defects they suffer from, her verses grab and seduce one; she paints what she feels; but she does it with such trueness to color, that her feelings are transmitted like magnetic fluid to the heart to those who hear her inspired word."

Her spouse posthumously published Cantos Postreros in a small private edition.

In 1948, the Dirección de Cultura of the Ministry of Education published a selection of her works.

== Death ==
After the death of Céspedes's brothers and father, the uncontrolled persecution against her family and the loss of all their goods caused her to move to Santa Isabel de las Lajas where she died on November 2, 1874.

== Published books ==
- Ecos de la Selva. Santiago de Cuba: Imprenta de Espinal y Díaz, 1861.
- Cantos Postreros. Cienfuegos: Imprenta del Boletín Mercantil, 1875.
- Poesías. Prologue and selections by Juan J. Remos. La Habana: Dirección de Cultura, 1948.
