= Independent Republican Party (Cuba) =

Independent Republican Party Partido Republicano Independiente
- Founded: 1900
- Dissolved: 1910

The Independent Republican Party (Spanish: Partido Republicano Independiente) was a political party in Cuba, led by Juan Gualberto Gómez. It was formed around 1900, after splits in the Republican parties in Havana, Matanzas and Las Villas. The split was caused by the opposition of the Republican parties to Gualberto Gómez's radical position against the Platt Amendment. The Independent Republican Party supported Gualberto Gómez's position on the issue.

== Overview ==
The party was able to build up an organizational network in different provinces of the island. In Havana, its members included Julián Betancourt, Alberto Barreras, E. García Enseñat y Asbert. In Oriente, it was joined by Joaquín Castillo Duany (who had been the leader of the Democratic Federal Republican Party of Santiago de Cuba) and Rafael Mandulay. In Matanzas, members included personalities such as García Pola, Manuel Sobrado and Juan Antonia Garmendia.

Ahead of the 1901 presidential elections, the party was one of the main forces campaigning for the candidature of Bartolomé Masó.
