= Oscar de Céspedes =

Cuban independence soldier KIA and second son of Carlos Manuel de Céspedes

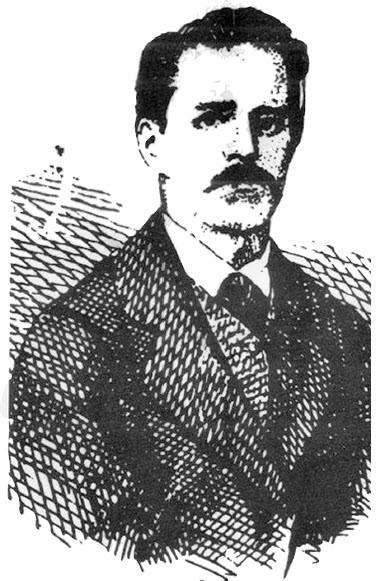
- Born: July 9, 1847; Bayamo
- Died: May 29, 1870 (Aged 22); Port-Au-Prince, Cuba
- Alma mater: University of Havana
- Relatives: Carlos Manuel de Céspedes
- Military career
- Branch: Cuban Liberation Army
- Conflicts: Ten Years' War †

Amado Oscar de Céspedes y Céspedes was a Cuban revolutionary soldier and the second son of Carlos Manuel de Céspedes, the first president of the Republic in Arms during the Ten Years’ War.

== Early life ==
Born on July 9, 1847, he was the child of María del Carmen Céspedes y López del Castillo, a cousin and first wife of Carlos Manuel de Céspedes. The couple had three children: Carlos, Oscar, and Carmen.

The family moved to the city of Manzanillo in 1852. Oscar attended elementary education in that city. Later, he attended high school in Havana and then entered the Faculty of Law of the Royal and Pontifical University of Havana.

== Ten Years' War ==
=== Cuban Revolutionary Junta ===
At the time of the Grito de Yara, the formal declaration of Cuban independence on October 10, 1868, Oscar was studying law in his third year at the university. Fearing political persecution following the outbreak of the revolution, he went into hiding, before managing to flee the island for exile in the United States, where he settled in New York City. There, he became actively involved with the Cuban Revolutionary Junta, advocating for Cuban independence and seeking to return to the island to join the insurgent forces.

According to correspondence from revolutionary agent Manuel de Jesús Morales Lemus, Oscar was committed to returning to Cuba to fight alongside his father. In a letter dated June 9, 1869, Lemus reported to Céspedes that Oscar had expressed a strong desire to participate in the war, despite receiving no explicit instructions from his father.

=== Return to Cuba, capture, and execution ===
He ultimately departed from New York on December 29, 1869, aboard the steam yacht Anna (also known as Bijiritas), as part of an expedition led by Domingo Goicuría. The vessel landed near Punta Brava, on the northern coast of eastern Cuba, on January 19, 1870, under precarious conditions, including the threat of interception by Spanish naval forces.

Shortly after the landing, Spanish troops initiated a campaign to locate and capture the expeditionaries. On January 21, 1870, Oscar de Céspedes was captured along with seven others near Guáimaro by counter-guerrilla forces led by Brigadier Carlos de Suauces, acting on intelligence regarding his whereabouts. Spanish Colonel Bengasi officially reported the capture in a dispatch published in the Gaceta de La Habana, identifying Oscar as “the son of the titled president.”

The Spanish Captain General Antonio Caballero Fernández de Rodas subsequently issued a communication to President Céspedes, offering to spare Oscar's life in exchange for the president's surrender and departure from Cuba. Carlos Manuel de Céspedes, prioritizing the revolutionary cause over personal considerations, refused the offer. In his response, he declared:

“Oscar is not my only son; all Cubans who die for our national freedoms are my sons.”

Oscar de Céspedes was tried by a military court in Guáimaro, sentenced to death, and the verdict was ratified on May 28, 1870. He was executed by firing squad the following morning, May 29, 1870, at 7:00 a.m. in the Plaza Mayor of Puerto Príncipe (present-day Camagüey), less than two months before his 23rd birthday.
