= Bartolomé Masó =

Cuban revolutionary and President of the Republic in Arms

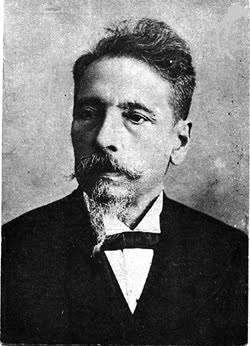

9th President of the Republic of Cuba in Arms
- In office October 30, 1897 – November 7, 1898
- Preceded by: Salvador Cisneros Betancourt
- Succeeded by: Military Government of Cuba

3rd Vice President of the Republic of Cuba in Arms
- In office September 1895 – September 1897
- President: Salvador Cisneros Betancourt
- Preceded by: Francisco Javier de Céspedes
- Succeeded by: Domingo Méndez Capote

Personal details
- Born: Bartolomé de Jesús Masó Márquez; 21 December 1830 Yara, Captaincy General of Cuba
- Died: 14 June 1907 (aged 76) Manzanillo, Cuba

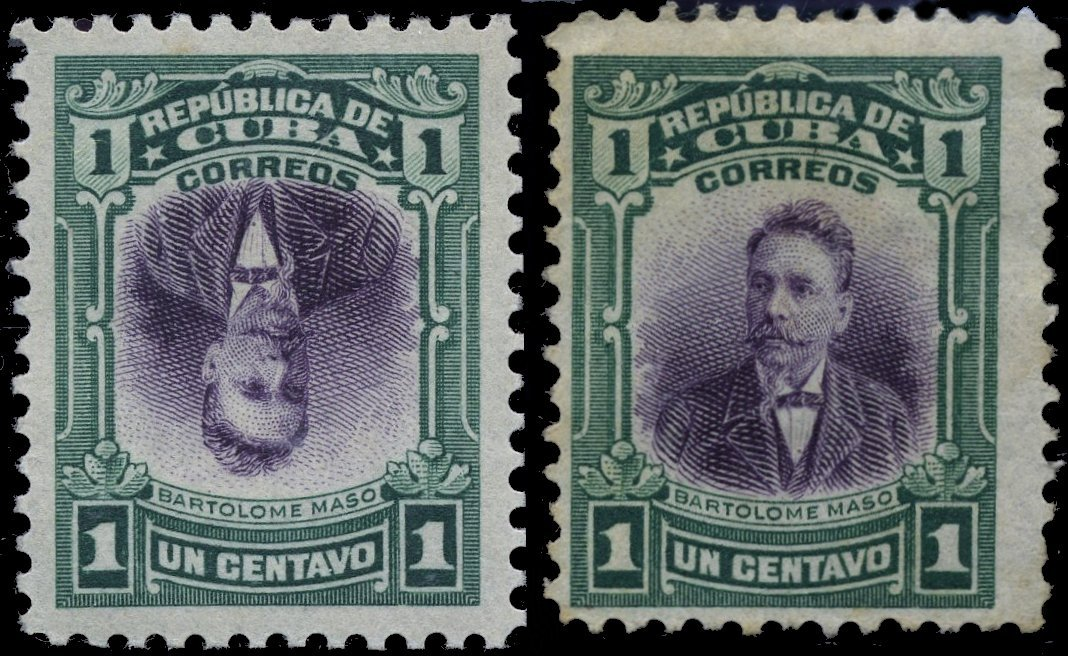
Bartolomé Masó on a 1910 Cuban stamp

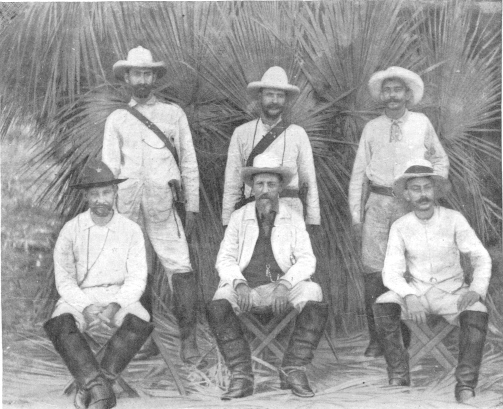
Executive government of the Cuban Republic in Arms. Ernesto Fons Sterling, Secretary of the Treasury; Vice-President Mendez Capote; Andrés Moreno de la Torre, Secretary of Foreign Affairs; President Bartolomé Masó; José B. Aleman, Secretary of War; Manuel Ramon Silva, Secretary of the Interior.

Bartolomé de Jesús Masó Márquez (21 December 1830 in Yara – 14 June 1907 in Manzanillo) was a Cuban politician and military patriot for Cuban independence from the colonial power of Spain, and later President of the República en Armas ("Republic in Arms").

== Biography ==
=== Early life ===
Masó, son of a Catalan father and a Cuban-born mother from Bayamo, was born in Yara on a farm named "Cerca Pie"; later he moved with his parents to the coastal city of Manzanillo. He was educated at the Convent of Santo Domingo. As a young man put his activities in the service of commerce, and cultivated his interest in literature, also composing verses.

In 1851 he protested in a speech against the execution of Narciso López on the garrote. Since this event he was under surveillance of the colonial authorities.

=== First battles ===
When in 1867 Carlos Manuel de Céspedes, Francisco Vicente Aguilera and other began to conspire ways to look at the independence of Cuba, Masó was one of the first who joined the cause. On 10 October 1868, when he thought the moment had come and took off with his two brothers, he met Céspedes in La Demajagua and took part in the unsuccessful uprising of Yara. He was involved in the attack and capture of Bayamo and to the liberation struggles in Jiguaní, Báguano, Rejondón, Bermeja and other places.

Shortly after the death of Céspedes, Masó was elected as representative of the department of Oriente; and when Tomás Estrada Palma was elected delegate of the Cuban Revolutionary Party (PRC), named him Secretary of War after the death of José Martí. When Estrada Palma was imprisoned he returned into the armed forces, as brigadier general.

In 1879, after the end of the Ten Years' War, he was imprisoned with the colonels Ricardo and Ismael Céspedes, first in the Castillo del Morro of Santiago de Cuba, and after in the Castillo de Santa Catalina, Puerto Rico. After, he was transferred to a Spanish prison in Cádiz. Set at liberty, he first visited Barcelona, and then returned to Cuba traveling through France, England, Switzerland and Italy.

=== War of Independence ===
The Cuban War of Independence began on 24 February 1895. Due to the serious illness of Guillermo Moncada, Masó transferred the command of the rebels in the Oriente until the arrival of major generals Antonio Maceo and Máximo Gómez. The battle of his units began in Bayate. He spent the eve of 19 May 1895 together with José Martí, who fell in the Battle of Dos Ríos the next day.

In September 1895, meeting the revolutionaries of the Asamblea de Jimaguayú (Assembly of Jimaguayú), Masó was elected vice president of the "Republic in Arms". Two years later, on 30 October 1897, he met the revolutionary government in La Yaya, where he was elected president. He held this office until 7 November 1898.

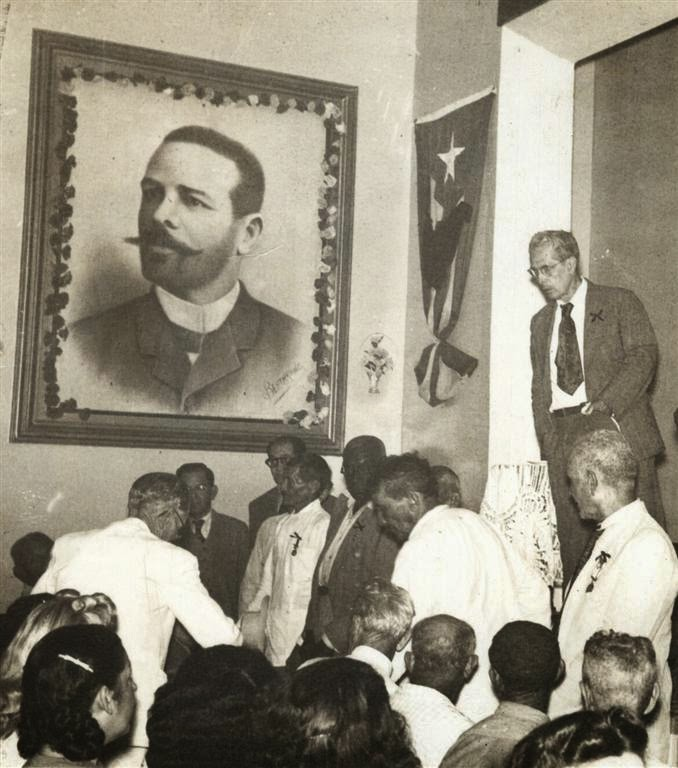
Portrait of Cuban independence leader Antonio Maceo, painted circa 1898 by American artist Henry Washburn Berthrong, who served as U.S. customs official in Manzanillo, Cuba.

In the elections of the first presidency of the independent Cuban republic in 1901, he ran against Tomás Estrada Palma, and was supported by the Independent Republican Party and the People's Labour Party. He withdrew his candidacy under pressure from the United States, which secured a permanent right of intervention in the young republic by the Platt Amendment, opposed by Masó.

Bartolomé Masó died on 14 June 1907 in Manzanillo. His remains are buried in the city's cemetery.

== See also ==
- Guáimaro Constitution
- List of presidents of Cuba
