= La Demajagua National Park =

National Park and historic site in Cuba

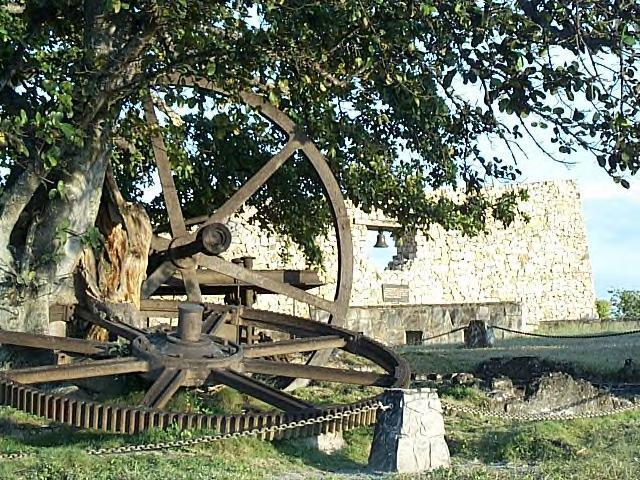
- Ruins of Ingenio La Demajagua
- Interactive map of La Demajagua National Park
- Type: National Park
- Location: Granma Province
- Nearest city: Manzanillo
- Nearest town: La Demajagua
- Coordinates: 20.282201076270734°N 77.17759178166969°W
- Area: 0.5 Km2
- Opened: October 10, 1968
- Founder: Celia Sánchez Manduley; Fidel Castro
- Designer: Mario García Menocal, 1918
- Owner: Government of Cuba
- Operator: Municipal Office of Monuments and Historical Sites of Manzanillo

La Demajagua National Park is a National Park located in Granma Province (formerly Oriente Province), about 12 kilometers from the city of Manzanillo, and is one of Cuba’s most important historic sites. It is the location of the former Ingenio La Demajagua sugar mill, where, on October 10, 1868, Carlos Manuel de Céspedes freed his slaves and launched the first armed uprising against Spanish colonial rule. This act initiated the Ten Years’ War, the first of a series of Cuban wars for independence from Spain. The date is considered the symbolic beginning of the Cuban independence movement and also of the abolitionist cause in the country. The site contains the remains of the sugar mill, including large metal gears and fragments of its original structure. It was named after the majagua plant (hibiscus elatus), which is a common plant in Cuba used for wood products and the binding of Cuban cigars.

There is a town of approximately 400 inhabitants, also called La Demajagua, located within the borders of the park, a few blocks away from the historical monuments.

== History ==
=== Slave plantation ===
For many years, Ingenio La Demajagua was a sugar plantation, occupied by the slaves of the Céspedes family. Historically, the mill comprised 16 caballerías (about 540 hectares) of land, of which only three were under cultivation at the time of the Cry of Yara uprising. It originally produced molasses, not refined sugar, and was powered by a steam engine, the remnants of which remain visible at the site.

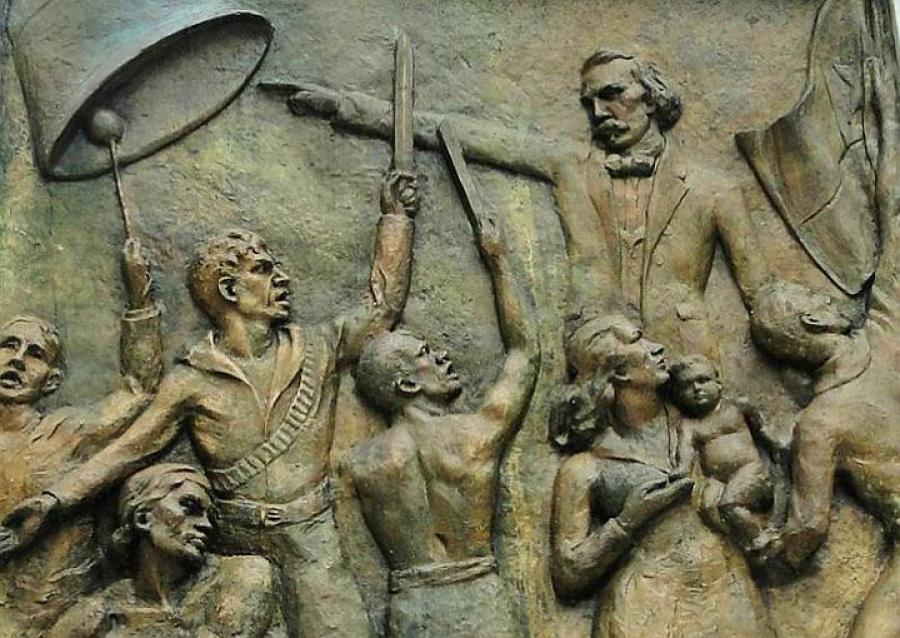
Plaque depicting the Cry of Yara at the base of the monument to Carlos Manuel de Céspedes in Céspedes Park. The Bell of La Demajagua is depicted being rung on the left of the image.

=== Cry of Yara ===
On the morning of October 10, 1868, Miguel García Pavón, a trusted associate of Carlos Manuel de Céspedes, repeatedly struck the clapper against the bronze Bell of La Demajagua to summon both black and white Cubans in the surrounding area. That day, Carlos Manuel de Céspedes gathered his followers, freed his slaves, and declared: “Citizens, that sun you see rising over the Turquino summit comes to illuminate the first day of Cuba's freedom and independence...” This event came to be known as the Cry of Yara, beginning Cuba’s Ten Years’ War and the first "war cry," (Spanish: grito) for Cuban independence.

The next day, the Cubans attacked and occupied the nearby town of Yara, having their numbers dwindled to only 12 men, until reinforcements arrived.

=== Spanish bombardment ===
Just a week later, on October 17, 1868, as Céspedes and his forces approached Bayamo to initiate its liberation, the Spanish naval gunboat Neptuno bombarded the La Demajagua estate. Spanish marines landed and razed what remained of the mill. The bell was buried in the rubble.

In 1869, the Spanish Crown executed a judicial seizure of the property, based on a mortgage Céspedes had with the firm Venecia Rodríguez y Compañía. An agent of the company, Fernando Palma y Forment, recovered remnants of the mill—including the bell—which he hid in the basement of the slave quarters at the nearby La Esperanza estate, in Caño Adentro, near Manzanillo. It remained there for over three decades.

=== Concept and inauguration of the Park ===
In 1918, for the 50th anniversary of the Cry of Yara, President Mario García Menocal suggested the creation of a National Park at La Demajagua, but his original plans were not approved by the Congress of Cuba.

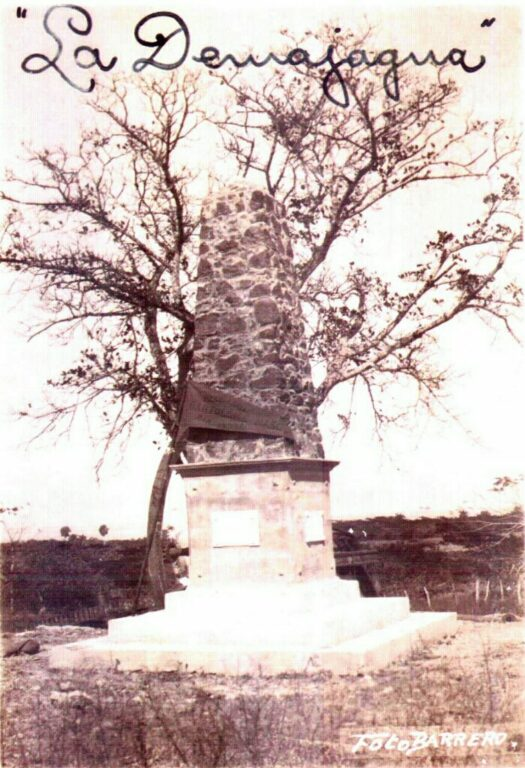
In 1928, the Freemasons of Cuba constructed a monument at La Demajagua.

In 1928, the Freemason Grand Lodge of Cuba erected an Obelisk at the site, marking the location of the events and ensuring that the land would not be developed. The Manzanillo Masonic Lodge tended to the site for the next 30 years. This obelisk was the only dedicated monument on the land for many years.

On October 10, 1968 – the centennial of the Cry of Yara – the "La Demajagua memorial site" was formally inaugurated under the direction of revolutionary heroine Celia Sánchez Manduley. The project was supported and inaugurated by Fidel Castro, who viewed the site as a symbolic place commemorating the birth of Cuban nationhood. The memorial was later designated a National Monument in 1978.

A monument designed by Santiago architect Fernando López was built on the site of the former mill. The Bell of La Demajagua was placed between the national flag and Céspedes’ original flag.

== Museum of La Demajagua ==
The park is nestled in a natural setting near the Granma mountains, and although the mill itself was long ago destroyed by war and weather, its ruins remain a powerful symbol of Cuba’s revolutionary legacy. La Demajagua functions as a museum of site and collaborates with local schools, particularly in Manzanillo, to promote historical education. As such, it remains a site of deep ethical and symbolic importance—a physical link to Cuba’s anticolonial struggle and its vision of a free nation.

=== The Bell of La Demajagua ===
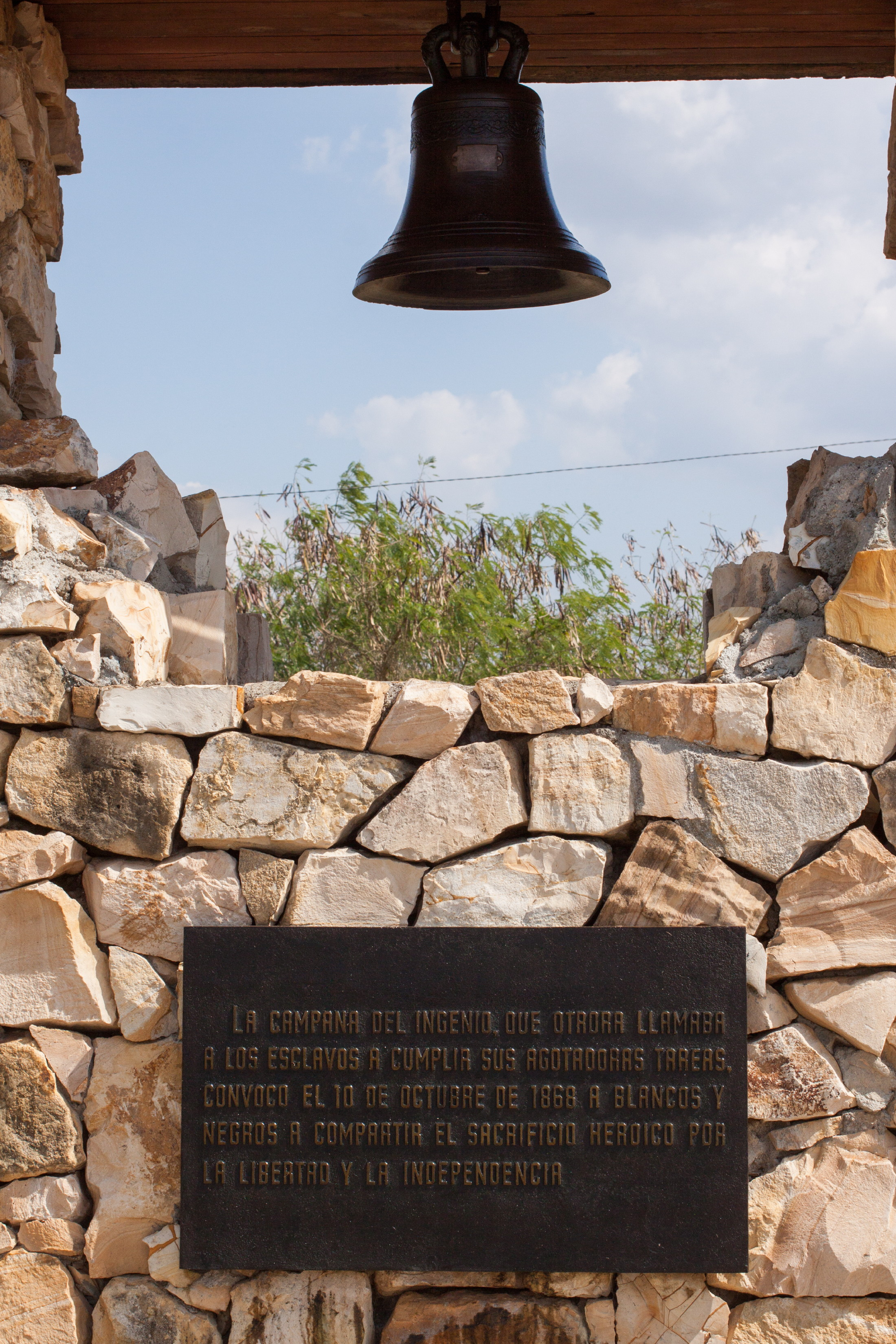
The Bell of La Demajagua hanging in La Demajagua National Park, with an inscription underneath. 2010.

Most notably, the Bell of La Demajagua has been preserved and served for many years as the centerpiece of a commemorative monument within the park. Cast in 1857, this bell is both a historic artifact and a national symbol of liberation. In 2017, the bell was placed in the Santa Ifigenia Cemetery in Santiago de Cuba, but it was returned to the park a year later, on the 150th anniversary of the Cry of Yara.

=== Other artifacts ===
The ruins of the original sugar mill, carefully preserved since their archaeological recovery in 1968. A symbolic jagüey tree, whose roots are embedded in the foundation of the old mill – popularized by a 1900 photograph that appeared in Bohemia in the 50's – now serves as a cultural symbol of Cuban national pride.

A pair of flags, the national Cuban flag and the Céspedes Flag are planted beside a royal palm, using soil that was sent into space during the 1980 joint USSR-Cuba spaceflight. The flags were ceremonially placed on January 8, 1981 in tribute to Arnaldo Tamayo Méndez, the first Cuban and Latin American cosmonaut.

There is also a stone wall sculpture, best when viewed from above, symbolizing the Cuban archipelago.

=== Living history ===
Each year on October 10, Cubans gather here to commemorate the start of the Ten Years’ War with theatrical reenactments, musical performances, and other patriotic events. These often portray the freeing of the enslaved and their participation in the fight for independence. The celebrations are deeply intertwined with local spiritual traditions such as espiritismo de cordón, a form of folk spirituality that emphasizes healing, ancestor reverence, and a deep connection to nature. This fusion of historical commemoration and cultural practice makes the park a vibrant symbol of both national identity and community heritage.

The park is closely linked to other symbols of early Cuban nationalism. Just days after Céspedes’s uprising, the La Bayamesa—which would become the national anthem of Cuba—was first sung in public in nearby Bayamo. That city’s Casa de la Nacionalidad Cubana hosts scientific conferences and events related to Cuban cultural heritage every October 20th, tying together the narratives of independence, abolition, and national culture. In this way, La Demajagua is part of a broader set of historic places that represent Cuba’s struggle for freedom and the formation of its national identity.

=== 150th anniversary restorations ===
When UNESCO first wrote of the site, they stated that the park had no viable tourist infrastructure, only a parking lot.

On the 150th anniversary of the Cry of Yara, President Miguel Díaz-Canel visited the park as part of an official government tour of Granma Province. His visit began with a moment of solemn silence and reverence before the historic ruins and monuments housed in the park museum. The President inspected ongoing restoration and rehabilitation worksintended to preserve the site's historical integrity while enhancing its presentation for future visitors. These works included the remodeling of the museum exhibition space and the construction of additional commemorative installations.

Díaz-Canel emphasized the importance of preserving authentic historical elements, particularly those original to the 1868 uprising. He acknowledged visible progress in the restoration since his previous visit in February of the same year and commended the dedication of the workers, who were reportedly 15 days ahead of schedule, according to Carlos Céspedes Leyva, director of the museum.

According to the Director of the Municipal Office of Monuments and Historical Sites of Manzanillo, the newly developed building includes a reception area, a map room, a library, administrative offices, a meeting room with a capacity for approximately 45 people, a workspace for technicians and specialists, as well as dedicated storage rooms—one for museum artifacts and another for various tools and equipment.

Improvements were also made to the monument’s access infrastructure. On the right side of the site, a parking area was constructed to facilitate easier and more secure access for high-ranking visitors and dignitaries. A protocol hall was also added, addressing the absence of a suitable reception space for the many distinguished guests who frequently visit the site. To accommodate this new hall, the only remaining room in the old house of the estate's last owner had to be repurposed. Previously, this space housed a small museum and provided essential visitor services. However, the original museum room was preserved and improved through a careful expansion, ensuring that its historical and educational functions were not only maintained but enhanced.
