= Cry of Yara =

Instigating event of the Ten Years' War

- Part of Ten Years' War
Date	10 October 1868 – 11 October 1868 (1 day)
Location	Yara, Oriente Province, Captaincy General of Cuba
Result	Cuban victory

Belligerents
Cuban rebels	Spain

Commanders and leaders
Gen. Carlos Manuel de Céspedes; Francisco Javier de Céspedes; Ricardo R. de Céspedes; Titá Calvar Bartolomé Masó	Unknown

Strength
500+ mambises	Unknown

The Cry of Yara (Spanish: El Grito de Yara) was a declaration, battle cry, and uprising in eastern Cuba on 10 October 1868, initiating the Ten Years' War. The signaling of the Yara uprising occurred near Manzanillo in the eastern province of Oriente, at the sugar plantation and mill of La Demajagua, which was owned by the Céspedes family.

== History ==
On October 8, 1868, Céspedes learned that colonial authorities in Manzanillo had issued arrest warrants for many of the conspirators. In response, he hastened plans for revolt and summoned insurgents to La Demajagua.

By October 9, over 500 men—armed primarily with machetes—had gathered. The call to arms extended across the surrounding region, with groups mobilizing from various estates. Among the participants were criollos, free and enslaved Afro-Cubans, two Colombian soldiers, and even two Spaniards who were coincidentally present and taken prisoner but not harmed. Among the soldiers gathered were some of the future leaders and commanders of the Cuban Liberation Army, including Titá Calvar, Jaime Santisteban, and Bartolomé Masó.

=== October 10th ===
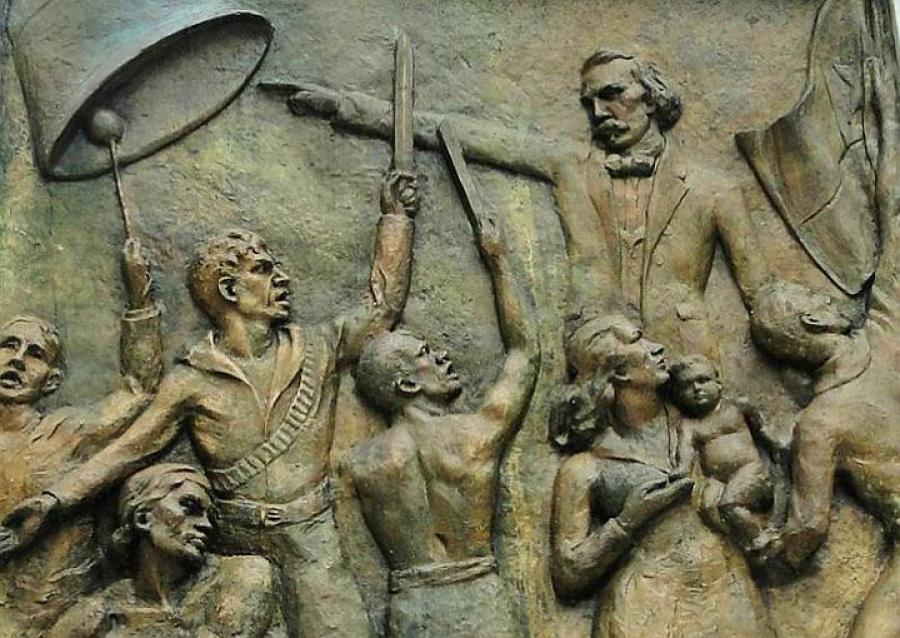
Plaque depicting the Cry of Yara at the base of the monument to Carlos Manuel de Céspedes in Céspedes Park. The Bell of La Demajagua is depicted being rung on the left of the image. The Céspedes Flag, the first flag of Cuba is depicted being flown on the right.

On October 10, the revolutionary proclamation of Cuba's independence known as the Cry of Yara (Spanish: El Grito de Yara) was issued by Cuban revolutionary and plantation owner Carlos Manuel de Céspedes. Following the tolling of the Bell of La Demajagua that morning by Miguel García Pavón, the brother of Colonel Emiliano García Pavón, which signaled his slaves that work was about to begin, they assembled before him, ready for instructions. Rafael Castellanos, alias Guairaje, served as the first horn. The flag later known as the Céspedes Flag, sewn by Candelaria Acosta (Cambula) was raised over the estate and Emilio Tamayo became its first standard-bearer.

Céspedes gave a passionate address, declared the independence of Cuba, and pledged to end slavery. He first liberated his own slaves and invited them to fight alongside him against Spanish colonial forces, initiating the Ten Years' War in Cuba. During the ceremony, Céspedes announced himself as Captain General and outlined the political aims of the revolution.

Céspedes said:

"We will march to the banks of the Almendares, whose clear waters will quench the thirst of our steeds, ready to tread with their hooves the last corner where the Iberian is hidden'. Set ranks!"

The rest of the day, the camped insurgents were kept busy making cartridges for the fifty or sixty shotguns that they possessed as the only firearms and distributing those weapons, because everyone wanted one. They also occupied themselves receiving men into the army, arriving from the nearby fields. Notably, the first man to join the Army that day was an Afro-Cuban freed man named José de Jesús Pérez, followed by a mixed group of volunteers including artisans, laborers, and planters.

That night, at around 10 or 11 o'clock, the rebels began their march toward the town of Yara, passing through the town of El Congo. After a brief rest and provisioning stop at the San Francisco mill, they resumed their march.

== The Battle ==
The Cuban insurrectionists remained at Demajagua, leaving the next day at dawn on October 11, 1868, with intentions to attack and occupy the nearby town of Yara. However, Spanish forces had already arrived. A sudden firefight erupted in Yara's central plaza between the poorly equipped insurgents and the regular Spanish troops. A total of 147 men armed themselves with 45 fowling pieces, 4 rifles, and several pistols and machetes.

The Spanish garrison at Yara, situated between the cities of Manzanillo and Bayamo, fell to Céspedes in his first successful military encounter. The confrontation was brief but disastrous for the rebels. Due to rain and lack of cartridge cases, their ammunition was ruined. Most firearms failed to discharge, leading to a swift Spanish counterattack and a dispersal of Céspedes’ forces. Only about a dozen rebels, including Céspedes, held their ground briefly before retreating. Among the casualties was Fernando Guardia, remembered as the first Cuban to die in combat for independence.

Despite the initial failure, Céspedes famously declared, “There are still twelve men left; they are enough to achieve the independence of Cuba.”

== Aftermath ==
By October 12, Céspedes and his commanders began regrouping scattered forces. With the help of Dominican military leader Luis Marcano, the insurgents formed a more organized resistance. By that evening, around 800 men had reassembled, reigniting the war effort. The news of the uprising at Yara inspired many to join the cause, leading to the eventual formation of the Cuban Liberation Army.

Cuba Independence Day is observed every year on October 10th as a national holiday and the anniversary of the beginning of the first Cuban War of Independence.
