= Vicente García González =

Cuban army general (1833–1888)

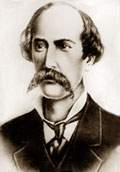

6th President of the Republic of Cuba in Arms
- In office December 10, 1877 – February 10, 1878
- Preceded by: Francisco Javier de Céspedes
- Succeeded by: Manuel de Jesús Calvar

Personal details
- Born: Vicente García y González; January 23, 1833 Las Tunas, Captaincy General of Cuba, Spanish Empire
- Died: March 4, 1888 (aged 55) Río Chico, Venezuela

Military service
- Allegiance: Cuba
- Branch/service: Cuban Liberation Army
- Rank: General
- Battles/wars: Ten Years' War

Vicente García González (January 23, 1833 – March 4, 1888) was a General in the Cuban Ten Years' War (Spanish: Guerra de los Diez Años, also known as the Great War) and later a Cuban President who was assassinated by the Spanish after the war.

== Biography ==
=== Early years ===
García was born on January 23, 1833, in Las Tunas.

=== Career ===
In November 1877, Cuban President Tomás Estrada Palma was captured and imprisoned by the Spaniards. Maximo Gomez is offered the presidency, but he refuses. [Many believe this to be factor that ended the Ten Year War unfavorably for the rebels.] Gen. Vicente García is named president of the Republic of Cuba.

=== Final years ===
On June 7, he left for Venezuela on the steamship Guadalquivir. He settled in Rio Chico, where he founded a cooperative with his family and continued to support the new revolutionary outburst.

== Death ==
On March 4, 1888, Vicente García y González died as a result of an assassination by the Spanish.
