= Francisco Javier de Céspedes =

Cuban politician (1821–1903)

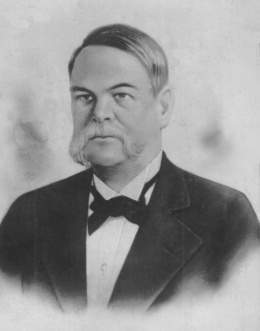

5th President of the Republic of Cuba in Arms
- In office October 19, 1877 – December 13, 1877
- Preceded by: Tomás Estrada Palma
- Succeeded by: Vicente García González

Vice President of the Cuban Republic in Arms
- In office April 15, 1877 – October 19, 1877
- Preceded by: Francisco Vicente Aguilera
- Succeeded by: Bartolomé Masó Márquez

Personal details
- Born: December 3, 1821 Bayamo
- Died: July 27, 1903 (Aged 81) Niquero
- Children: Ricardo de Céspedes
- Brother: Carlos Manuel de Céspedes

Military service
- Branch/service: Cuban Liberation Army
- Rank: Major General
- Battles/wars: Ten Years' War; Cuban War of Independence

Francisco Javier de Jesús de Céspedes y López del Castillo was a Cuban revolutionary soldier, politician, Vice President, and President of the Cuban Republic in Arms.

== Life and career ==
He was the brother of Carlos Manuel de Céspedes, often regarded as the "Father of the Homeland."

He assumed the presidency following the capture of Tomás Estrada Palma and served until the House of Representatives elected Major General Vicente García as his successor on December 10, 1877. His presidency occurred in the final phase of the war, during a time of internal divisions and declining revolutionary momentum. Holding the rank of Major General in the Liberation Army, he had previously served as Secretary of Foreign Affairs under Estrada Palma's administration. His tenure as interim leader, lasting from October 23 to December 13, 1877, was brief but dedicated to maintaining morale and reinforcing confidence in the nation’s future.
