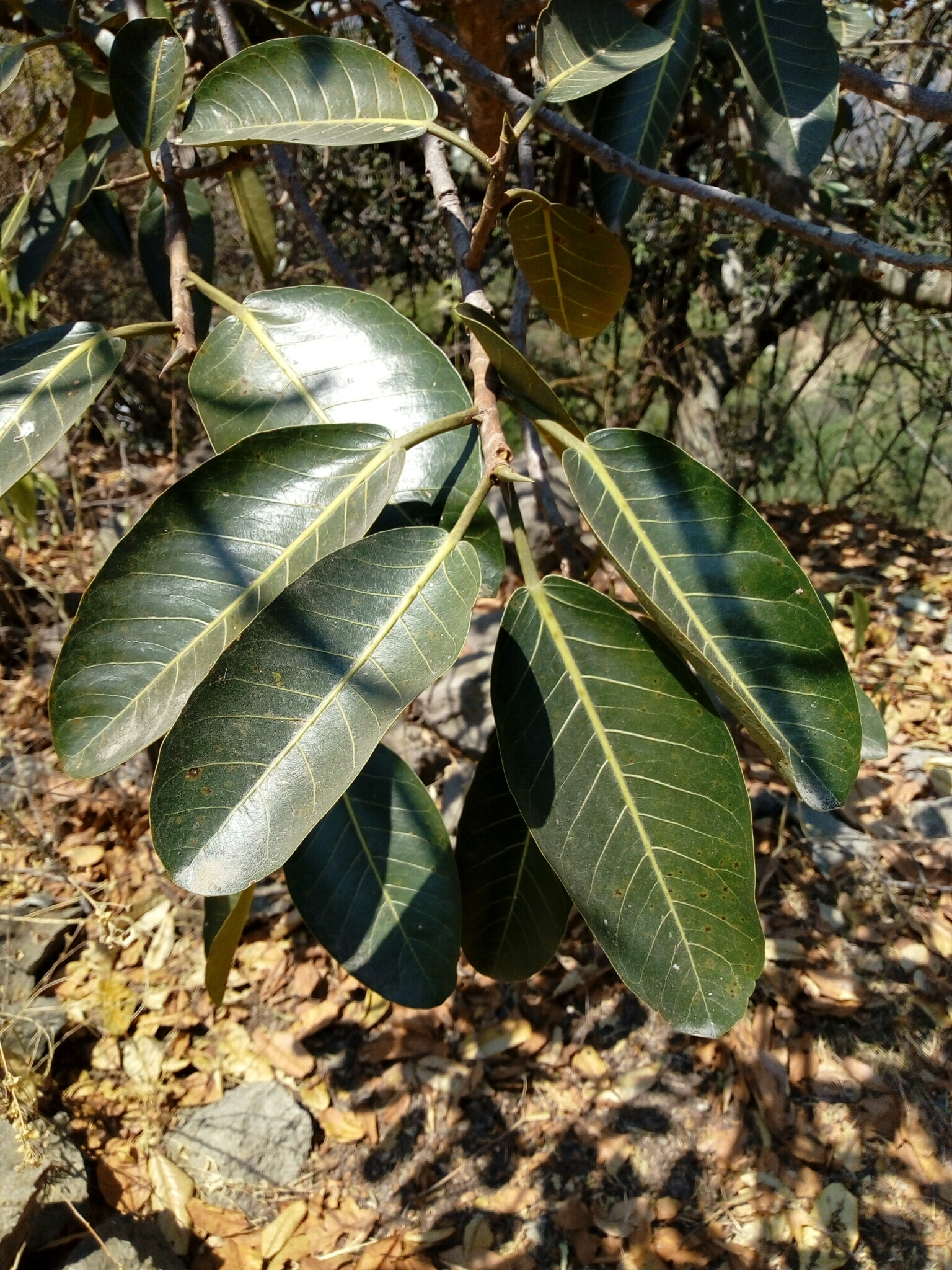

Conservation status
- Least Concern (IUCN 3.1)

Scientific classification
- Kingdom: Plantae
- Clade: Tracheophytes
- Clade: Angiosperms
- Clade: Eudicots
- Clade: Rosids
- Order: Rosales
- Family: Moraceae
- Genus: Ficus
- Species: F. trigonata

Binomial name
- Ficus trigonata L.

Synonyms
- Ficus wrightii Warb.; Urostigma trigonatum (L.) Griseb.

= Ficus trigonata =

Species of fig

Ficus trigonata is a species of tree in the family Moraceae. It is native to Cuba, Hispaniola (the Dominican Republic and Haiti), Puerto Rico, and the Leeward Islands in the Caribbean. It grows in tropical moist submontane and lower montane forest.
