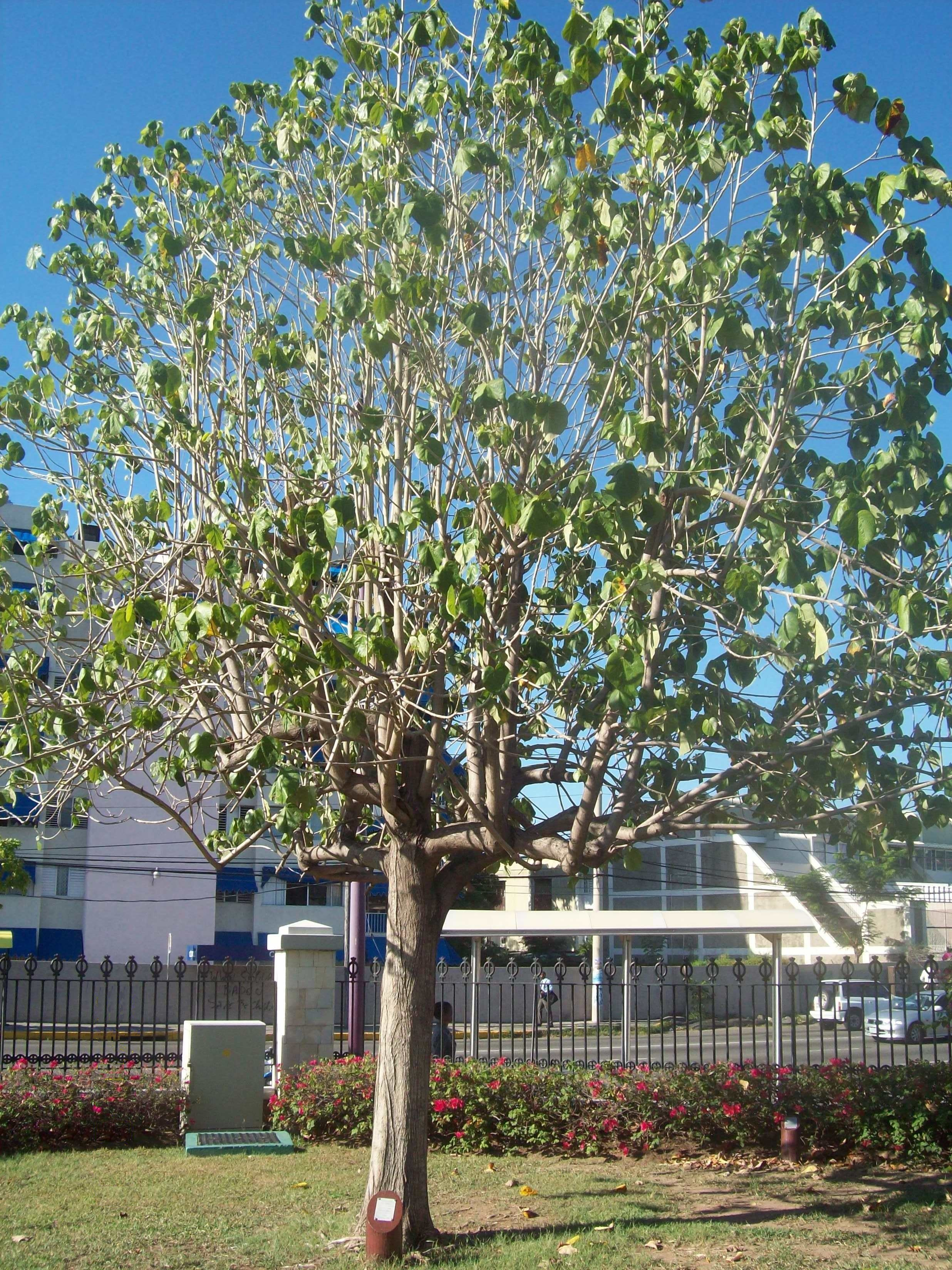
- Blue mahoes are common urban trees in Jamaica. This one is growing in Emancipation Park, Kingston.

Scientific classification
- Kingdom: Plantae
- Clade: Tracheophytes
- Clade: Angiosperms
- Clade: Eudicots
- Clade: Rosids
- Order: Malvales
- Family: Malvaceae
- Genus: Hibiscus
- Species: H. elatus

Binomial name
- Hibiscus elatus Sw.

Synonyms
- Hibiscus tiliaceus subsp. elatus (Sw.) Borss.Waalk.; Pariti elatum (Sw.) G.Don; Talipariti elatum (Sw.) Fryxell

= Hibiscus elatus =

Species of plant

Hibiscus elatus, synonym Talipariti elatum, known typically as the blue mahoe or majó azul, is a species of flowering tree in the mallow family, Malvaceae.

== Distribution ==
Hibiscus elatus is native to the islands of Cuba, Jamaica the US. Virgin Islands and Puerto Rico. In wetter areas it will grow in a wide range of elevations, up to 1,200 metres (3,900 ft) and is often used in reforestation. It is the national tree of Jamaica.

== Description ==
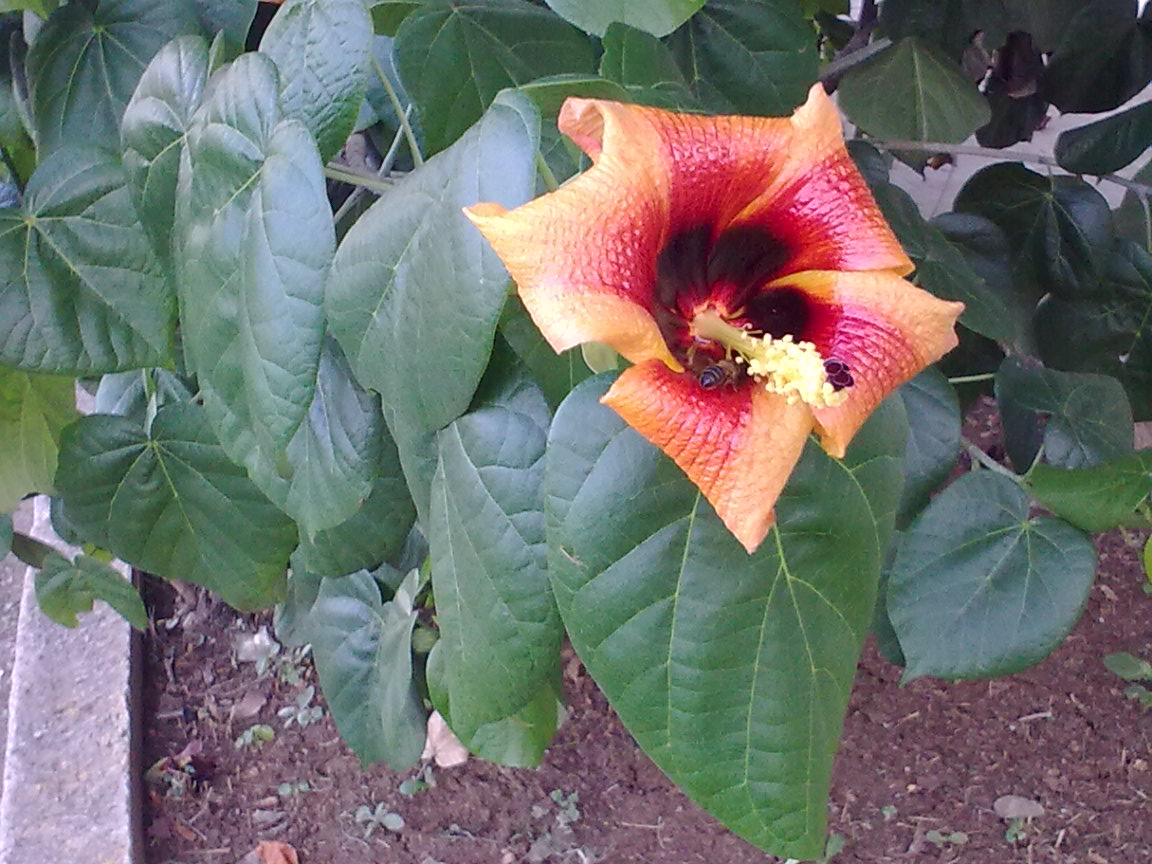
Flowers on a tree in Havana, Cuba

The Hibiscus elatus tree is quite attractive with its straight trunk, broad green leaves and hibiscus-like flowers. It grows quite rapidly, often attaining 20 metres (66 ft) or more in height. The flower changes color as it matures, going from bright yellow to orange, red and finally crimson.

The name mahoe is derived from a Carib word. The 'blue' refers to blue-green streaks in the polished wood, giving it a distinctive appearance.

== Uses ==
The blue mahoe is a beautiful and durable timber that is widely used for cabinet making and making decorative objects such as picture frames, bowls and wood carvings.

The inner bark of the tree is often referred to as Cuba bark because it was formerly used for tying bundles of Havana cigars. Similarly the bark could be used to form a strap or belt.

The wood has a musical quality and has been traditionally used in the making of the cuatro, a type of lute. Fine boxes, furniture, inlay works, floors, details, turned pieces, jewellery boxes, sculptures, and ancient board games, have been made from the mahoe. It is utilized by architects, furniture-makers, designers, artists, and amateur woodworkers. The wood has fine sanding and turning qualities, and a natural gloss that is accentuated when finely finished; it is variegated in purple, metallic blue, and olive colors, often with bluish streaks. In some lumber there can be grey, green, black, blue and purple colors all combined in just one small piece. Growing conditions may be responsible for the color variations, but this has not been proven.

Mahoe or Hibiscus elatus, (also known as "blue mahoe" for the characteristic coloration of its wood after milling), is a tree native to Jamaica and Cuba. A volunteer species, characteristic of open disturbed habitats and also found, due to its shade tolerance, as an understory tree in secondary forests, mahoe grows to 25 m tall and upwards of 100 cm DBH (KIMBER, 1970). It was recognized as a potentially important species for plantation and forest enrichment after a survey by Jamaican foresters (LONG, 1963 cited in KIMBER, 1970). It is an excellent wood with a rich variety of colors and attractive grain, but surprisingly, very little mahoe is currently produced anywhere else. Mahoe can vary greatly in color from tree to tree, the blue tone does not tend to endure for many years. The wood transforms over time to shades of browns, purples, greys, and bluey-greens. The first plantings in Puerto Rico were in the 1940s and it has also been introduced to other Caribbean islands and Hawaii for evaluation. It has become naturalized in Mexico, Peru, Brazil, southern Florida and the West Indies.
