= Carlos Manuel de Céspedes =

Cuban revolutionary and plantation owner (1819–1874)

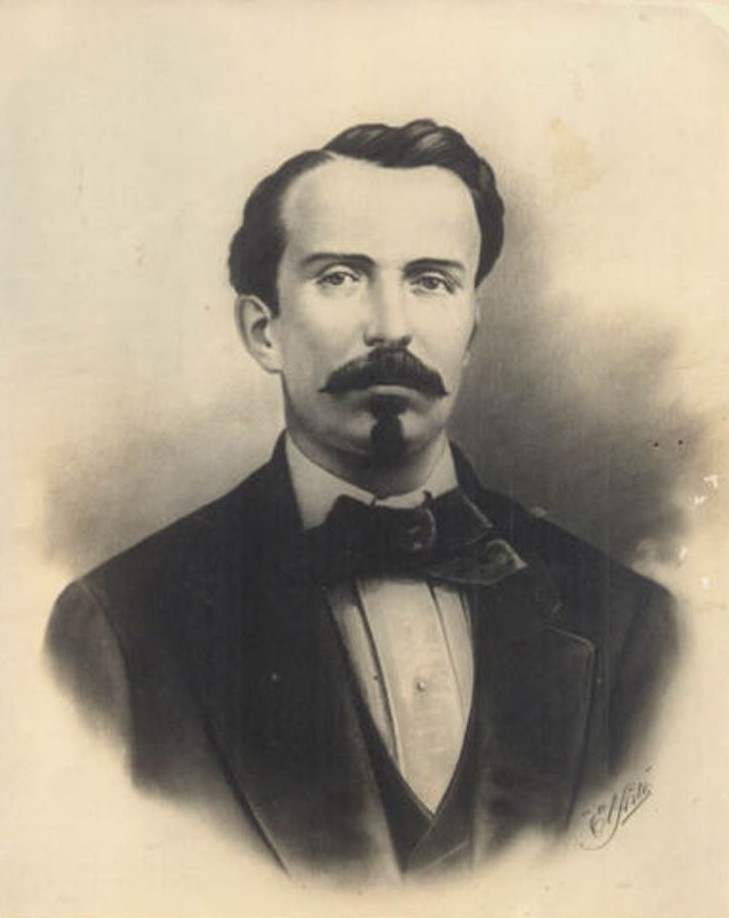
- Carlos Manuel de Céspedes

1st President of the Republic of Cuba in Arms
- In office 1869–1873
- Vice President: Francisco Vicente Aguilera
- Succeeded by: Salvador Cisneros Betancourt

Personal details
- Born: 18 April 1819 Bayamo, Oriente Province, Captaincy General of Cuba, Spanish Empire
- Died: February 27, 1874 (aged 54) Sierra Maestra, Oriente Province, Captaincy General of Cuba, Spanish Empire
- Resting place: Santa Ifigenia Cemetery
- Children: Carlos Manuel de Céspedes y Quesada; Oscar de Céspedes

Military service
- Allegiance: Cuban Liberation Army
- Years of service: From 1868 to his death in 1874
- Rank: Army General
- Battles/wars: Ten Years' War; Cry of Yara

Carlos Manuel de Céspedes del Castillo (18 April 1819 – 27 February 1874) was a Cuban revolutionary hero and First President of Cuba in Arms in 1868. Céspedes, who was a plantation owner in Cuba, freed his slaves and made the declaration of Cuban independence in 1868 which started the Ten Years' War (1868–1878). This was the first of three wars of independence, the third of which, the Cuban War of Independence led to the end of Spanish rule in 1898 and Cuba's independence in 1902.

Because of his actions which led to the eventual independence of Cuba, and the fact that three of his children died during his long fight for independence, he is known there as the "Father of the homeland".

== Ten Years' War ==
Céspedes was a landowner and lawyer in eastern Cuba, near Bayamo, who purchased La Demajagua, an estate with a sugar plantation, in 1844 after returning from Spain. On 10 October 1868, he made the Cry of Yara (Spanish: Grito de Yara), declaring Cuban independence, which began the Ten Years' War. That morning, after sounding the Bell of La Demajagua, which indicated to his slaves it was time for work, they stood before him waiting for orders, and Céspedes announced that they were all free men and were invited to join him and his fellow conspirators in war against the Spanish government of Cuba. He is called the "Father of the Country" (Spanish: Padre de la Patria). In April 1869, he was chosen as President of the Republic of Cuba in Arms.

The Ten Years' War was the first serious attempt to achieve independence from Spain and to free all slaves. The war was fought between two groups. In eastern Cuba the tobacco planters and farmers, joined by mulattos and some slaves, fought against western Cuba, with its sugarcane plantations, which required many slaves, and the forces of the Spanish governor-general. Hugh Thomas summarized that the war was a conflict between criollos (creoles, born in Cuba) and peninsulares (recent immigrants from Spain). The Spanish forces and the peninsulares, backed by rich Spanish merchants, were at first on the defensive, but in the longer run, their greater resources held.

Céspedes was deposed in 1873 in a leadership coup. Spanish troops killed him in February 1874 in a mountain refuge, as the new Cuban government would not let him go into exile and denied him an escort. The war ended in 1878 with the Pact of Zanjón, which made concessions: liberation of all slaves and Chinese who had fought with the rebels and no action for political offenses but no freedom for all slaves and no independence. The Grito de Yara had not achieved enough, but it had lit a long-burning fuse. Lessons learned in it would be put to good use during the Cuban War of Independence.

== Personal life ==
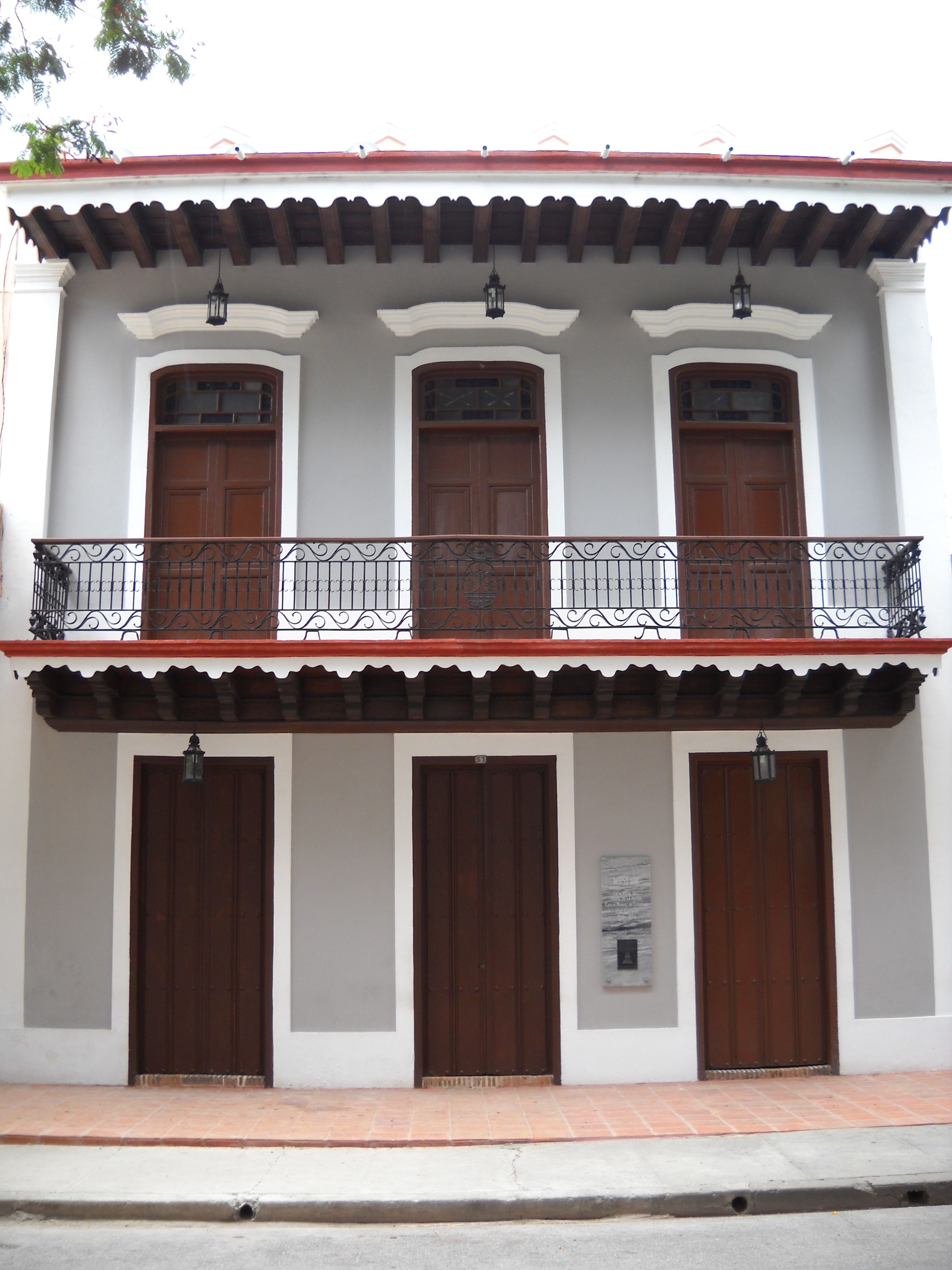
Birthplace of Carlos Manuel de Cespedes

Born in 1819 in Bayamo into a family dedicated to the production of sugar, he studied at the University of Havana, where he graduated in 1840. In Spain, the country to which he moved intending to pursue his law studies, he participated in revolutionary and anti-government activities, being arrested and forced into exile in France.

After returning to Cuba, and convinced of the need to oppose militarily the metropolis as the only way to achieve the independence of the island, he came into contact with other opponents of the colonial regime, among them Salvador Cisneros Betancourt, Bartolomé Masó and Pedro Figueredo. Most of the opposition, like Céspedes himself, came from sugar families settled on the eastern end of the island, traditionally poorer and less developed.

Céspedes was married twice and had two lovers who also bore him children. The first marriage was in 1839 to Maria del Carmen de Céspedes y del Castillo (his first cousin) and they had Maria del Carmen, Oscar de Céspedes, and Carlos Manuel de Céspedes y Céspedes. His first wife died in 1867 of tuberculosis and in 1869 he married for the second time to Ana de Quesada y Loynaz (1843–1910) and they had 3 children, Oscar, and twins Gloria (1871–?) and Carlos Manuel de Céspedes y Quesada (1871–1939), who was briefly President of Cuba after Gerardo Machado was deposed in 1933.

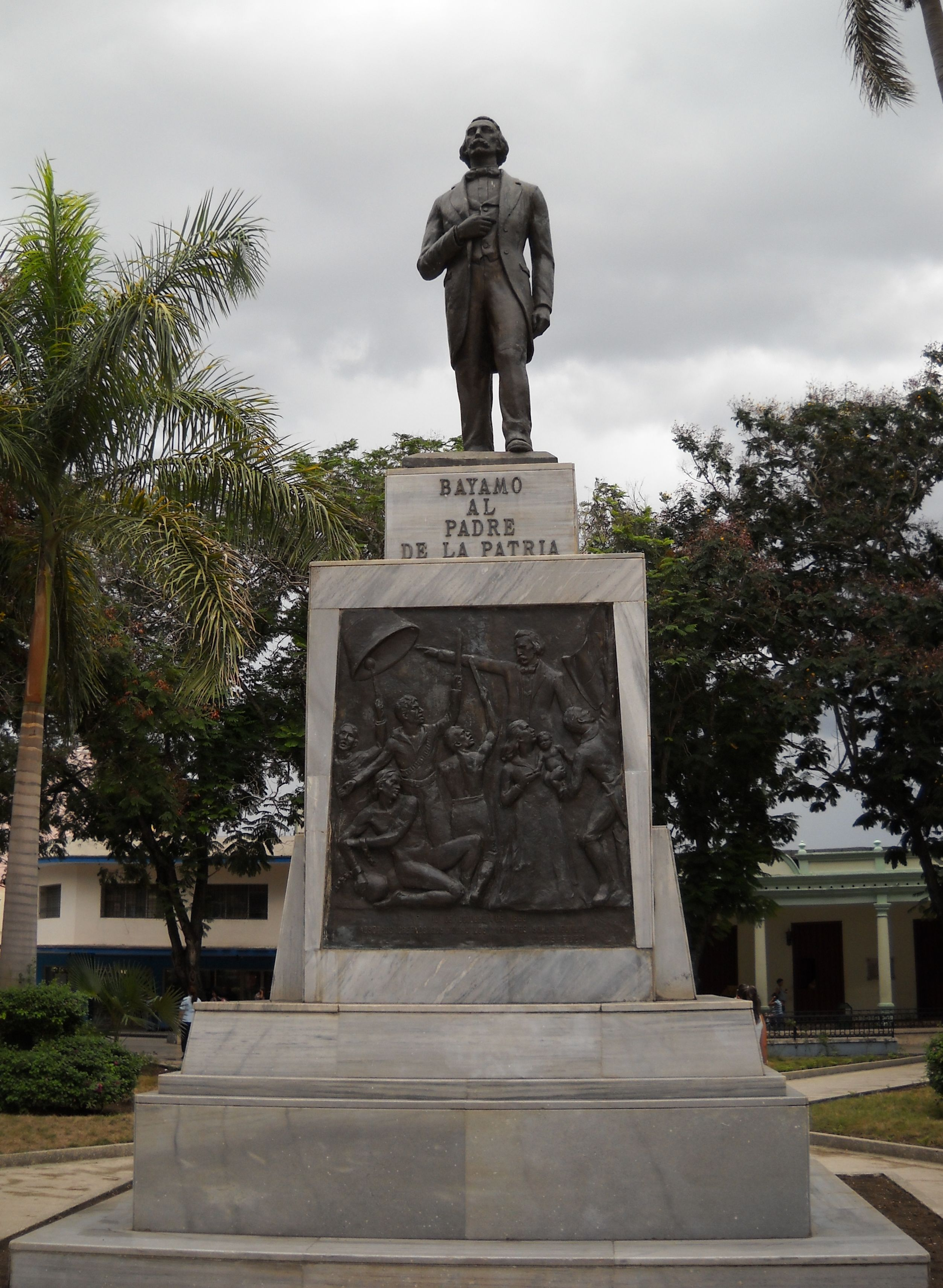
Statue of Carlos Manuel de Céspedes in Céspedes Park in Bayamo

Between his two marriages, it is believed he had carried on an affair during or shortly afterwards with Candelaria "Cambula" Acosta y Fontaigne (b. 1851) then the 17-year-old daughter of the foreman of his plantation Juan Acosta and wife Concepción Fontaine y Segrera. He had tasked Cambula with sewing the first flag that he designed for Cuba. With Cambula he had a daughter, Carmen de Céspedes y Acosta (b. 1869). Fearing for their safety he moved a then-pregnant Cambula and daughter to Jamaica. In 1872 their son Manuel de Céspedes Y Acosta was born in Kingston. In San Lorenzo, before he died, Carlos Manuel met a widow, Francisca (Panchita) Rodriguez. Carlos Manuel and Panchita became lovers and produced a son, Manuel Francisco de Céspedes y Rodriguez.

He named Oscar, his fifth son, after his late second child Oscar, who was executed by a Spanish firing squad. The Spanish authorities wanted to exchange Oscar's life for Céspedes' resignation as President of the Republic of Cuba at Arms (not to be confused with his son Carlos Manuel de Céspedes y Quintana who was in 1933 named President of Cuba after President Machado fled the country). He famously answered that Oscar was not his only son, because every Cuban who had died for the revolution he started, was also his son.

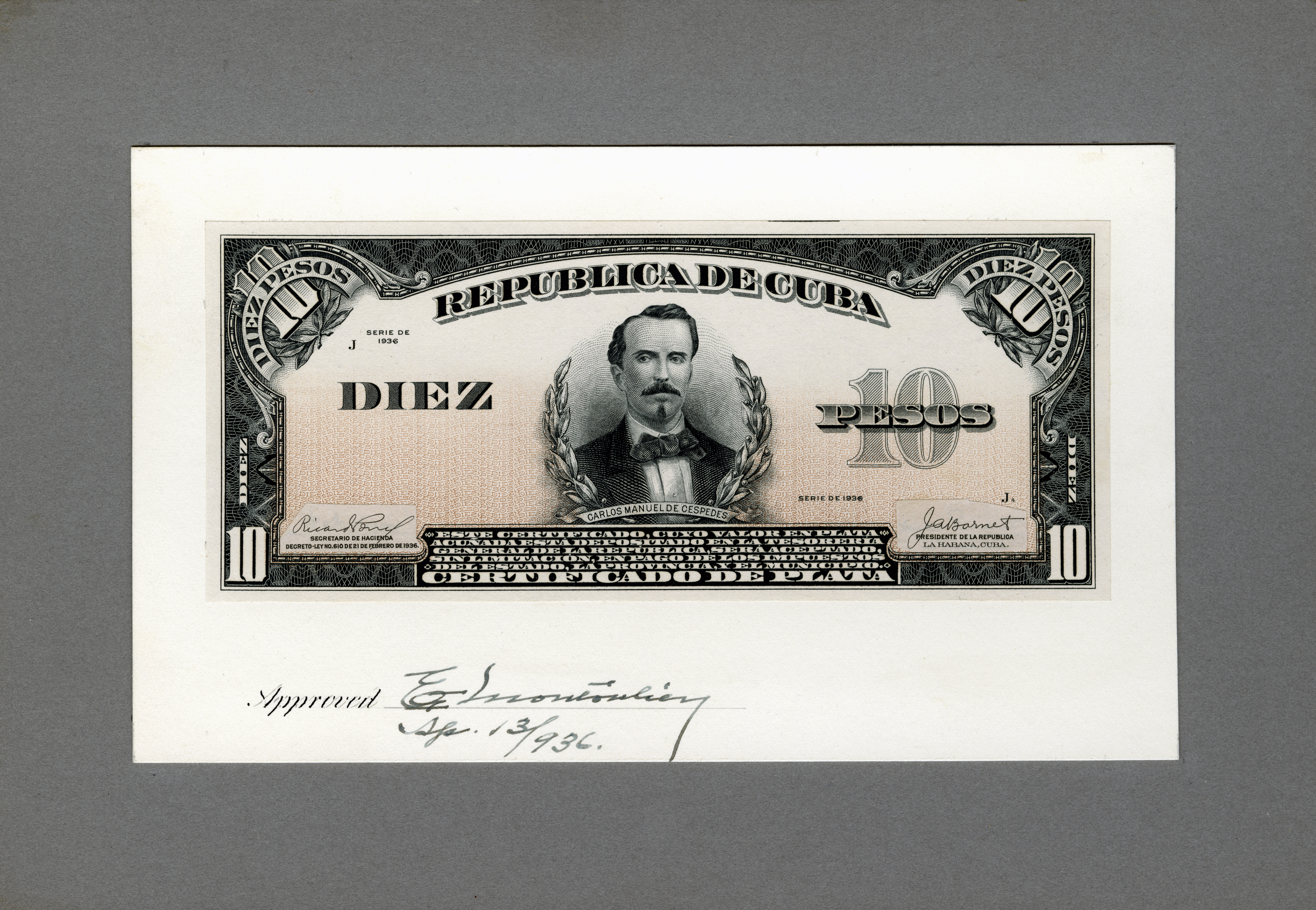
Céspedes depicted on the artist/progress proof designed by the Bureau of Engraving and Printing for Cuban silver certificates (1936).

He had been, before the conflict, something of a musician, and he was part-composer of a romantic song called La Bayamesa. In addition, he supported the work of his distant relative Úrsula Céspedes, even writing the prologue for one of her works.

His portrait was on the 10 pesos bill in Cuba until 1960, when it was moved to the 100 pesos bill. A municipality in Camagüey Province, Carlos M. de Céspedes was named after him. In 1926, the Order of Carlos Manuel de Céspedes was created and named in his honour; until 1978, it was the seniormost Cuban order for merit.
