= Juan Nepomuceno Burriel =

Spanish army general (1823–1877)

Juan N. Burriel
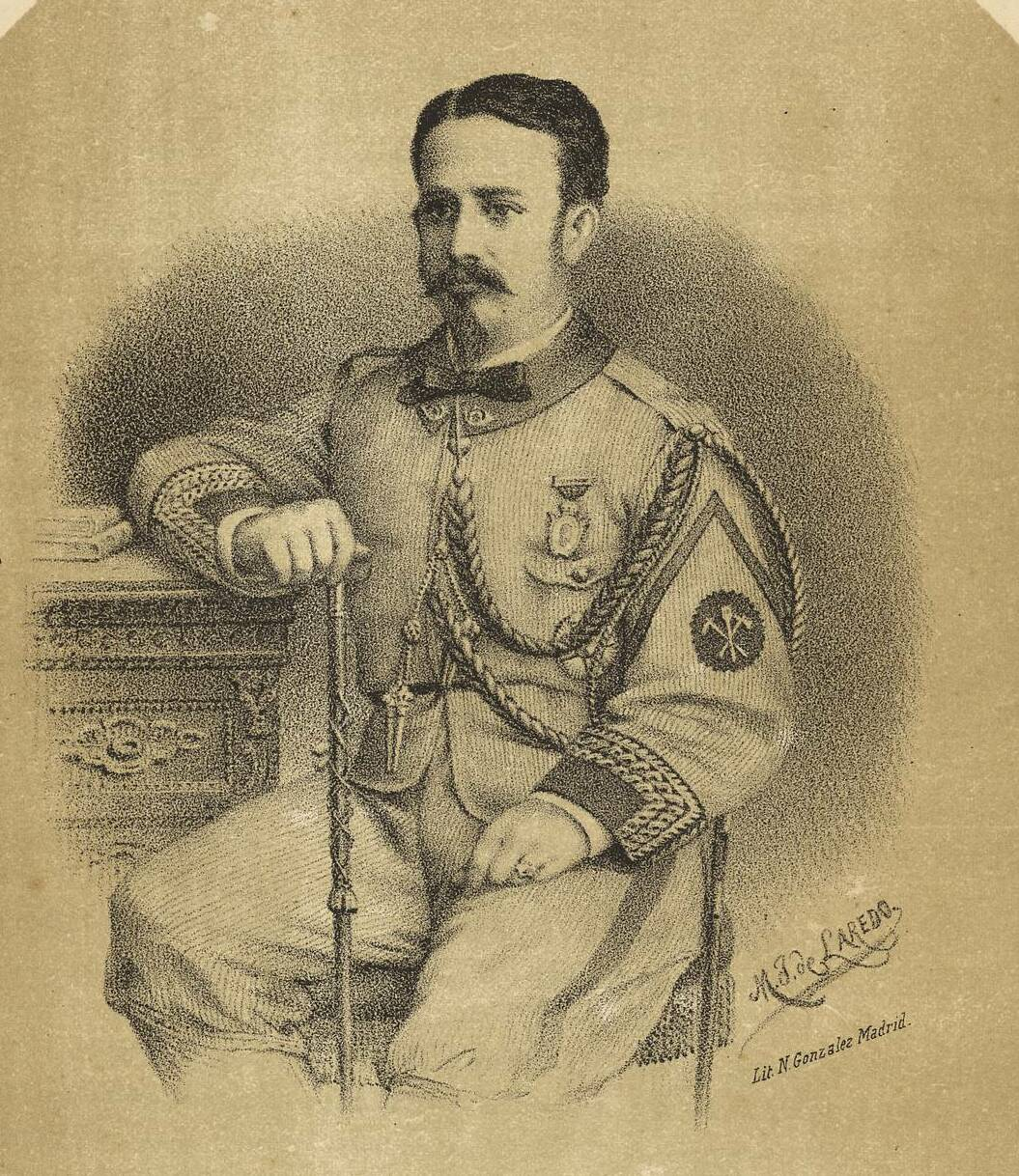
- Born: Juan Nepomuceno Burriel y Linch; December 13, 1823; Rota, Cádiz, Kingdom of Spain
- Died: December 24, 1877 (aged 54); Madrid, Kingdom of Spain
- Military career
- Allegiance: Spain
- Branch: Spanish Army
- Rank: General
- Conflicts: Second Carlist War; Spanish-Moroccan War; Ten Years' War
- Awards: Grand Cross of the Military Merit; Grand Cross of the Royal and Military Order of Saint Hermenegild; Laureate Cross of Saint Ferdinand; Officer of the Legion of Honour

Juan N. Burriel (December 13, 1823 – December 24, 1877) was a Spanish army general who served in the Second Carlist War, Spanish-Moroccan War, and Ten Years' War.

== Early life ==
Juan Nepomuceno Burriel y Linch was born in the Spanish province of Cádiz, in the town of Rota, on December 13, 1823. Antonio Burriel de Montemayor, his father, held the title of Knight in the Royal Orders of Saint Ferdinand and San Hermenegildo.

At the age of twelve, he entered the general military academy of Segovia. When Carlist general Zaratiegui conquered Segovia in 1837, Burriel was forced to relocate to Madrid. By 1840, he rose to the rank of lieutenant, later entering the General Staff School in 1843, where he was promoted and earned commendations.

Burriel participated in various military campaigns, including the pursuit of Carlist forces during the Second Carlist War. He was awarded the 1st Class San Fernando Cross.

He was assigned to the Captaincy General of Aragon in 1852.

In 1859, he participated in the Hispano-Moroccan War in which he served as captain of the General Staff of the First Army Corps under Rafaél de Echagüe y Bermingham. In the same year, he was elevated to the position of commander of the unit.

Burriel traveled to Mindanao and Jolo by order of Captain General Rafael Echagüe, acting as the Chief of Staff of the Philippine Army from November 5, 1862, to January 22, 1863.

Serving in the General Staff Corps, he intervened in the 1866 Carlist insurrection in Madrid and was seriously wounded while trying to suppress the uprising. He was promoted to brigadier shortly before moving to his next assignment. Burriel was appointed as the military governor of the Province of Toledo and the director of the Toledo Infantry Academy, positions he held until 1868.

== Cuba ==
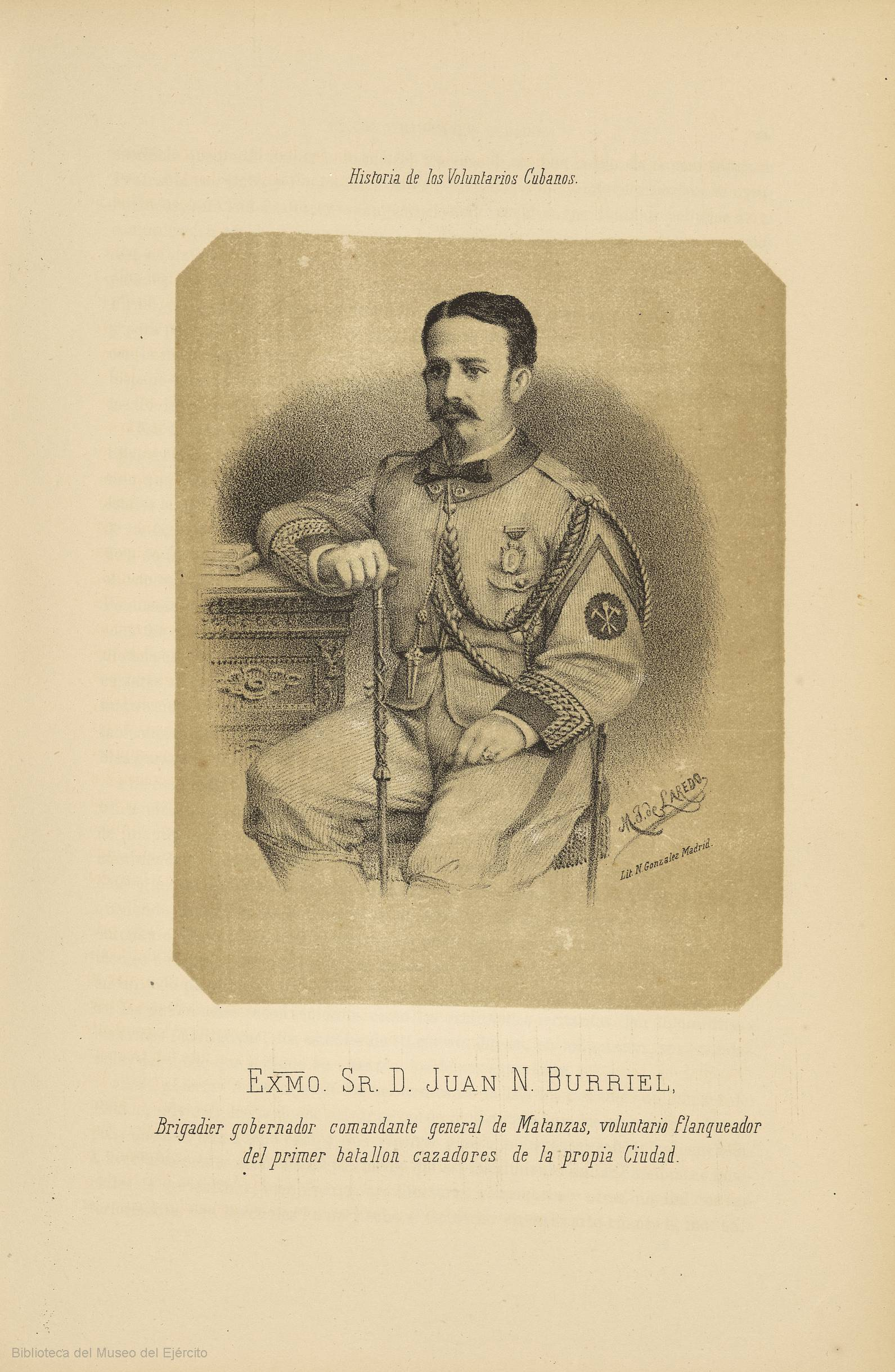
Juan N. Burriel, General Commander of Matanzas, 1872

In 1869, he was assigned to Cuba amid the Ten Years' War and appointed military commander of the Matanzas district.

From 1873 to 1874, he assumed the governorship of Santiago de Cuba Province under Governor General Joaquín Jovellar y Soler.

=== The Virginius Affair ===
On October 27, 1873, the commandant of the Spanish garrison dispatched the Spanish warship Tornado under the command of Captain Dionisio Costilla following reports of suspicious activity. On October 30, a chase ensued of the North American steamer, the Virginius. The filibustering vessel was captured on October 31, 1873, and taken to the port of Santiago de Cuba.

A Spanish court-martial convened by Burriel on November 2, 1873, swiftly sentenced the Virginius captives, with the first four executions taking place on November 4, 1873. In a report to the Governor-General Joaquín Jovellar y Soler, he indicated the leaders of the expedition as Bernabé Varona, William A.C. Ryan, Jesús del Sol, and Pedro de Céspedes. On the 7th and 8th of the month, 53 crew members, including Joseph Fry, were executed at Santiago de Cuba for piracy on Burriel's orders. On November 8, British Naval officer Lambton Lorraine arrived at the port of Santiago de Cuba on the HMS Niobe to intervene and prevent further executions of the surviving Virginius crew and passengers by Burriel. The American consul in Havana alerted the United States Department of the Navy for aid. By November 15, Burriel was confronted by Commander William B. Cushing of the USS Wyoming on the harbour pier who threatened to open fire on Santiago de Cuba if the punishments weren't suspended. Upon the threat of the ship's cannons pointed towards the Governor's palace, Burriel agreed to halt the executions. Spain's Government later pledged to comply with international law, return the Virginius, free the surviving crew and passengers, and provide an indemnity of $80,000 to both the British and United States governments.

Burriel was dismissed and sent back to Spain, but he was able to regain significant military roles after the Bourbon restoration of December 29, 1874. In 1875, Burriel was appointed mariscal de campo in Spain's military, which is equivalent to major general. This promotion was called into question by Caleb Cushing, the U.S. Consul to Spain in a letter to Alejandro de Castro y Casal on August 18, 1875.

The Spanish Tribunal of the Navy took up Burriel's case in June 1876.

== Death ==
Juan Burriel died on December 24, 1877, in Madrid, Spain before a trial could take place for his role in the executions.
