= Cuban Solidarity Movement in the United States =

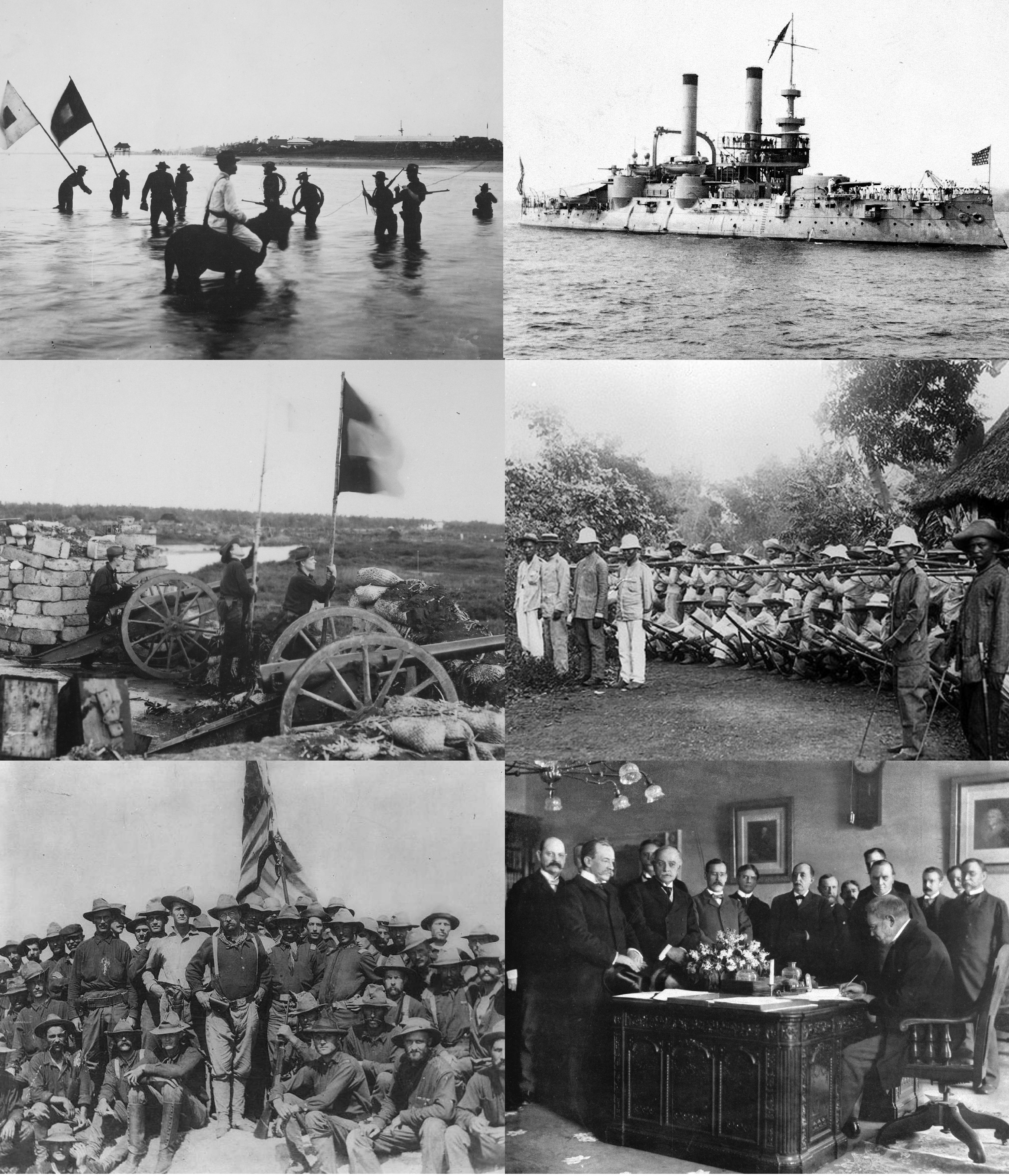
The Spanish-American War

The Cuban Independence movement consisted of 3 wars over 40 years in which the United States involved itself to various degrees. These are the 10-Years' War, The Little War, and The Cuban War of Independence. These conflicts evoked multiple levels of support from different groups within the United States, which changed over time and as the conflicts progressed. African Americans showed heavy support in the early stages of the conflict, while business leaders were more inclined to withhold their support. The position of the U.S. government shifted throughout the conflict in accordance with presidential administrations. Many factors shaped these reactions within the United States, including the economy, The Yellow fever, and events like the Sinking of the U.S.S. Maine, and the Virginius Affair. The United States did not directly involve itself in the conflict until the Spanish-American War, known by the Cubans as the Cuban War of Independence in 1896.

== Background ==
The Cuban Independence Movement began in 1868 with the uprising of Cubans from the eastern provinces. Under Spanish rule, Cuban nationals experienced high tax rates, poor political management, and little representation in the homeland. Under the leadership of Manuel de Céspedes, The Cubans declared independence, Initiating the 10-Years' War. The rebels' interests ranged from ending slavery to gaining economic freedom from Spain, which would give more political power to the individual laborer. Before the revolution gained enough traction to overthrow Spanish rule, Spanish political leaders sent General Arsênio Martinez Campos to crush the rebellion. After the death of Céspedes and other key leaders of the independence movement, Campos created a new constitution, and the war ended.

After the constitution's creation, a relapse in rebel activity led to what is known as the Little War, in which Calixto Garcia led a second rebel uprising to war with the Spanish establishment in a conflict that lasted less than a year. The rebels were ill-equipped to fight against the Spanish government. They faced a myriad of problems, from a lack of supplies like ammunition and weapons to a lack of foreign support from other countries, making the attempted revolution a lost cause. By the end of the war, the leaders of the insurgents had been captured and imprisoned.

After the 17 years of relative peace prompted by the Spanish victory over Cuban rebels in the Little War, changes in the social climate, such as the freeing of the slaves in 1886, caused economic decline to a catastrophic degree. These factors prompted Cuban nationals to once again move towards independence from Spain, On February 24, 1895 with the issuing of the "Grito de Baire" declaring "Independencia o Muerte" (independence or death). This declaration of independence was met with support from the United States of America, Initiating what is known in the United States as the Spanish-American War and in Cuba as the Necessary War (Guerra Necesaria.)

== African Americans ==
The first solidarity movement in Cuba started with the Ten Years' War in 1868. Many African Americans in the United States Identified strongly with the movement due to the significant role that slavery played in the economy of Cuba. Having recently received their freedom, African Americans felt the responsibility to eradicate slavery on a global level. Cuba presented itself as the perfect opportunity to make a difference with the newly gained freedoms Africans in the United States had received. Leaders among the African American groups like Frederick Douglass and Henry Highland Garnett postulated that true Cuban independence could only be true independence if it included the abolition of slavery. This position generally aligned with that of Cuban leaders such as Carlos Manuel de Céspedes. When Cespedes Initiated the independence movement, he freed his slaves, garnering support from many formerly enslaved people in the states.

=== The Conspiracy of la Escalera ===
In 1821, Spain committed to ending the shipment of slaves to Cuba. When this promise was left unmet, slaves in Cuba pushed back, causing what was known as the conspiracy of la escalera. The events that ensued sparked the early beginnings of Cuban independence from the side of Cuban-Africans. When the Cuban government received word of a purported slave uprising that was to take place on Christmas in December 1843, they issued a manhunt of all suspected participants of African descent, both free and enslaved. Many of those who were caught were tied to a ladder (escalera) and whipped until they confessed the names of other conspirators involved. The leaders of the conspiracy were lined up and killed by firing squad. Most blacks that were captured were killed, but all whites arrested were eventually released. Despite the dire consequences, it is debated whether the conspiracy was real or whether it was invented by the Spanish government to squash possible future insurgents. The events of la Escalera provoked outrage among African Americans, changing what were initially sympathies among the community into outright support.

=== Perceived unity ===
In the mid to late 1800s, enslaved Africans formed a considerable part of the population and economy in Cuba. In the United States, inequality was still prevalent with continued segregation and Jim Crow laws following the recent freeing of the enslaved people. The country, however, was still very much divided. One of the contributions that provoked African-American support was the unity found among the rebel fighters in Cuba. The slaves freed by their owners fought alongside them in equal fashion, contrasting the vast division located within the U.S. The Manifesto of Montecristi contributed significantly to the demand for unity among the different races of Cuba. Jose Marti authored the manifesto stating the absolute necessity of all blacks' participation in the independence movement and the complete unity between blacks and whites in the fight against Spain.

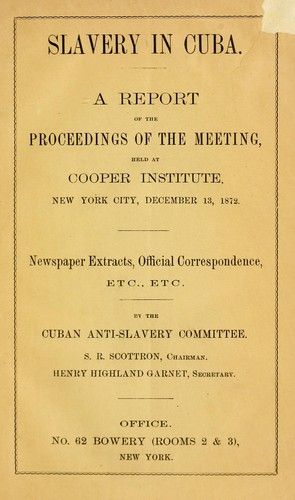
Slavery in Cuba, A Report from the Cuban Anti-Slavery Committee

=== The Cuban Anti-Slavery Committee ===
Founded by Henry Highland Garnet in reaction to the 10-year war in Cuba, the committee was created in opposition to widespread slavery that continued in Cuba after the freeing of the slaves in the United States. The committee was created to garner more widespread support and outrage among Americans to aid Cuban insurgents who were adamantly anti-slavery. Furthermore, it was believed that activism on the foreign front against slavery would shed light on the injustice experienced within the United States. The committee took action by collecting signatures on a petition to present to Congress, catalyzing a movement that resulted in hundreds of thousands of signatures. The committee also published several pamphlets, including Slavery in Cuba, which raised awareness of the injustices that enslaved Cubans experienced. The popularity and support that the committee garnered grew to such an extent that they received an audience with President Grant. Despite his reception of Garnet and the committee, he did not promise support for the cause due likely to his secretary of State, Hamilton Fish, who felt that the race of the Cubans made them undeserving of American support.

=== Division in the Spanish–American War ===
As the nature of the conflict changed the widespread support of Cuban Solidarity by African-Americans shifted, becoming more split with the sinking of the Maine and the involvement of the United States in the Spanish-American War. Some publications, like the Washington Bee, openly opposed black support of Cuban independence, stating that blacks in the U.S. should deal with their problems in the United States before becoming preoccupied with Cuban solidarity. Furthermore, there was the worry that by entering the war, Americans would bring the prejudices that blacks had experienced on the mainland to Cuba, aggravating the problems already present on the Island. They argued that racial discrimination in the United States was far worse than any that Cubans had experienced under the likes of General Valeriano Weyler and that the cruelty of southern Whites in the U.S far surpassed that of Spaniards. Other journalists in black-run newspapers openly supported the entry of the U.S. into the war. E.E. Cooper of The Colored American pointed out the difference between imperialism and expansion, advocating that winning the war would benefit both the Cubans and the United States. He argued that the war was an opportunity for African Americans to prove their worth and to forge a stronger brotherhood with the other races that made up the United States. He also theorized that with the independence of Cuba and a newly established rapport between the United States and Cuba, blacks would be able to relocate to Cuba, which would surely be free of racial prejudice and discrimination. Rhetoric like that of E.E. coopers inspired many African Americans to Volunteer for the militia, being among the first units mobilized in the war, with eight states contributing all-black units to the war force.

== Influences affecting American involvement in the conflict ==
=== U.S.S. Maine ===
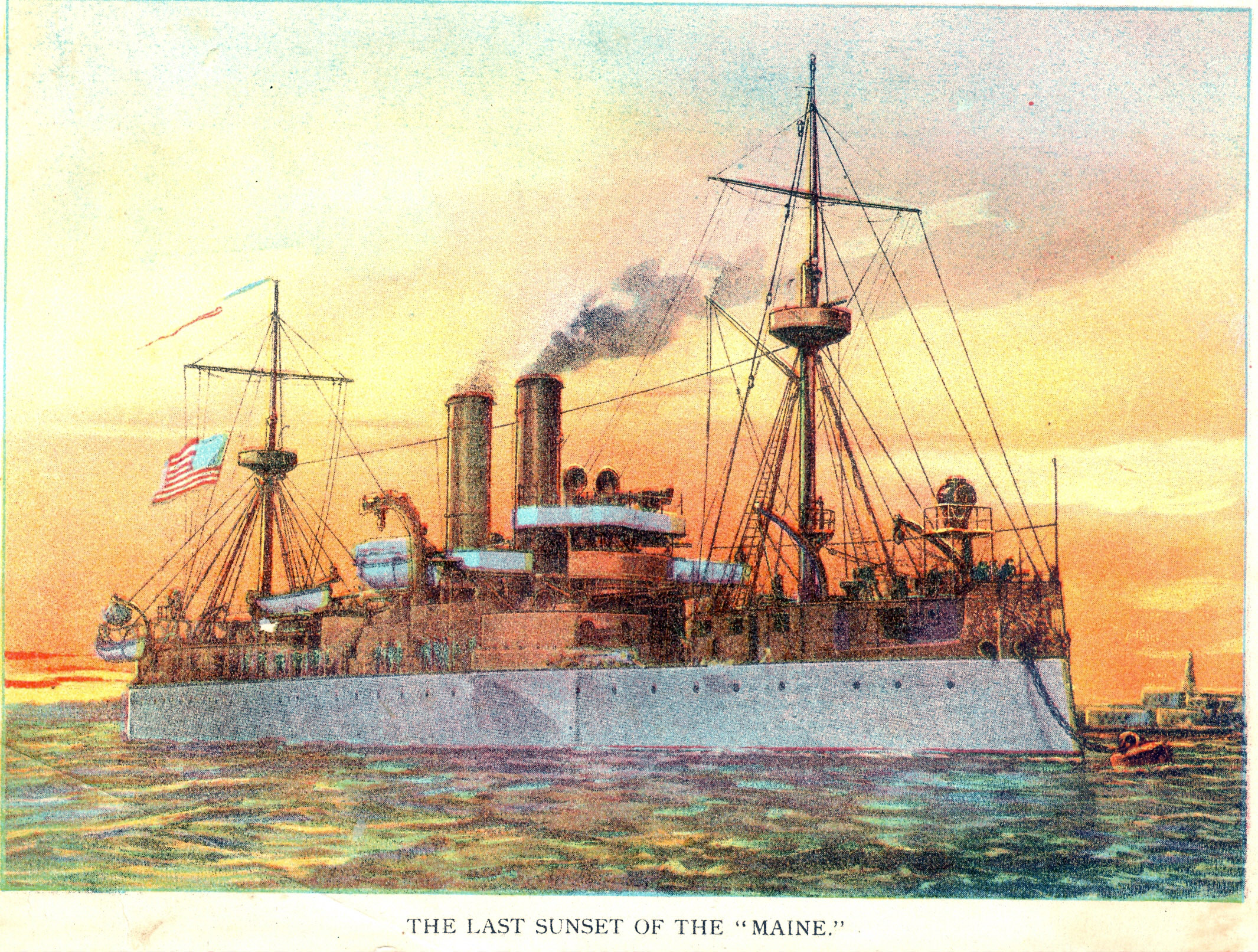
The U.S.S. Maine

The U.S.S. Maine, positioned in Havana Harbor to safeguard U.S. interests during the ongoing conflict between Cuba and Spain, has been described as an armored cruiser or second-class battleship. While representing an advance in American warships, it was obsolete by the time it was completed. During the evening of February 15, 1898, under calm weather, the vessel was engulfed in an explosion and sank, resulting in the deaths of three-quarters of her crew. While it was clear that the ship's forward magazines had exploded, the cause of this was uncertain, with theories including an internal buildup of gas from low-quality coal in adjacent bunkers and the alleged mining of the harbor by Spain – the latter theory being reported as fact in American newspapers. Proponents of war coined rallying cries, such as "Remember the Maine! To hell with Spain!" to mobilize support for U.S. intervention. The Maine became a talking point in popular American culture, referenced in music of the period. The U.S. public was divided over the best course of action for the country. Many wished for the United States to prove itself an equal to the major European powers, and acquiring Cuba as a colony was one path toward achieving this status.

=== American business ===
During the time leading up to the United States' involvement in the conflict between Spain and Cuba, extensive discourse ensued among business owners. These discussions centered on the potential economic repercussions and implications that war would have on the nation. Considerable deliberation revolved around the anticipated effects on American businesses and whether the involvement in the conflict would prove beneficial or detrimental to the United States. Various newspapers engaged in discussions about how war might jeopardize the stability of the currency, disrupt trade, and pose threats to U.S. coasts and commerce. Railroad companies thought they would lose more than they would gain. Even arms manufacturers thought that going to war would not be profitable. Journals speaking for the steel and iron manufacturers wrote that war “would injure the iron and steel makers ten times as much as they would be benefited by the prevailing spurt in the manufacture of small arms, projectiles, and steel plates for warships”.

=== Yellow fever ===
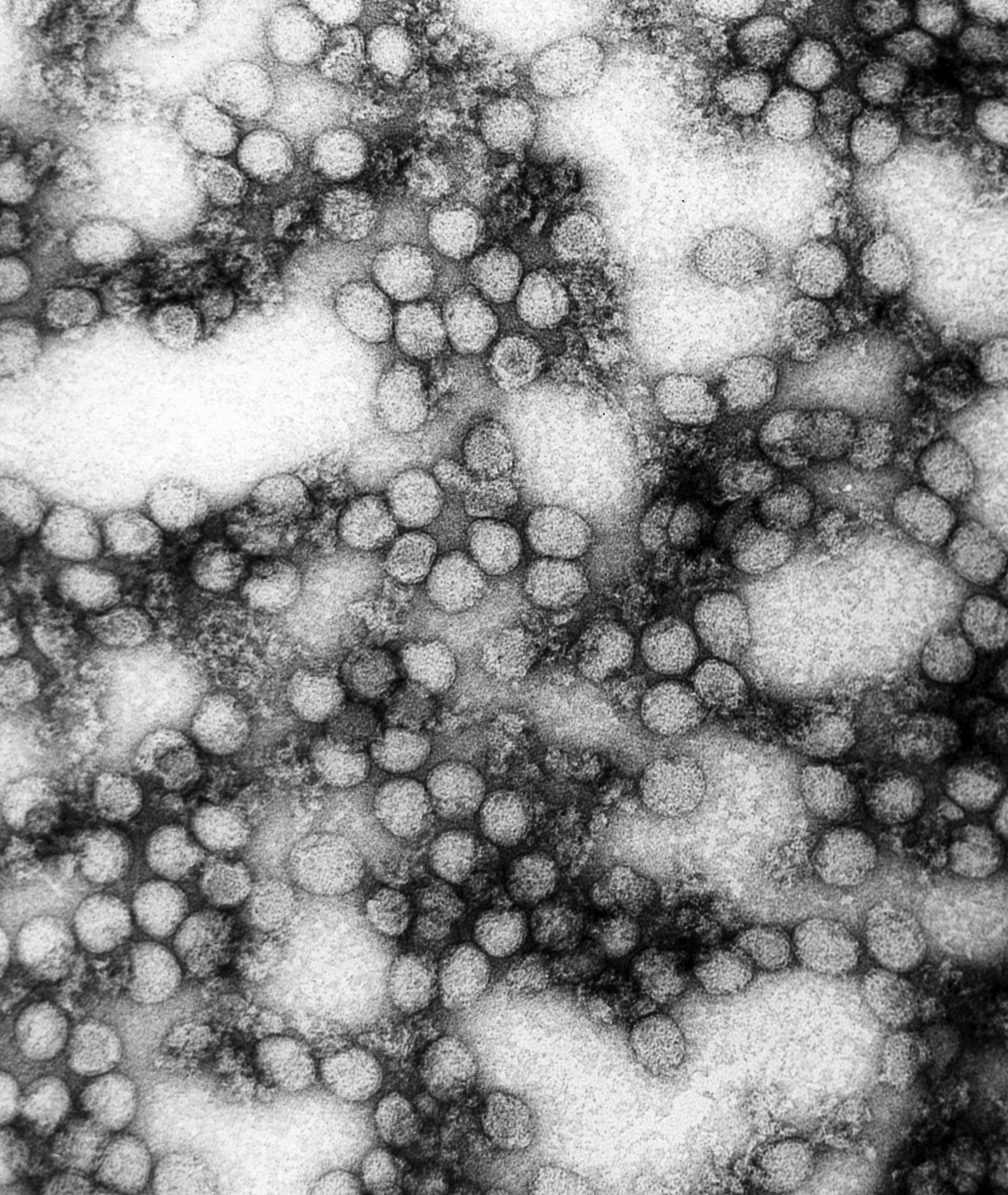
Yellow Fever Virus

In 1877, Yellow fever broke out in the United States and caused massive economic losses estimated to be at least 100 million dollars. Over 120 thousand people contracted the disease, and more than 20 thousand died. U.S. health officials were convinced that Havana was the origin and felt that to stop the disease and prevent more losses, the disease needed to be studied and understood. In 1879, the United States Board of Health organized and sent a group of experts named the Havana Yellow Fever Commission to Cuba to study yellow fever and suggest policies that would stop the importation of the disease from Cuba and into the United States. While there, they found that Cuba had poor sanitation conditions that fostered the spread and cultivation of the Yellow fever disease. The Commission then suggested that ships that had been in Cuban ports would be disinfected and their cargoes quarantined before they were allowed to port in the United States. Despite these efforts to protect United States citizens from contracting yellow fever on September 6, 1897, word broke out across the South that yellow fever was in New Orleans. U.S. soldiers that were stationed there were transferred to Fort McPherson in Atlanta Georgia by order of evacuation. By the end of that week, all railroads 300 miles around New Orleans were shut down. Word spread across the United States concerning yellow fever and the cases popped up all across the south. In Edwards Mississippi, several cases began to pop up and in just a matter of a few days, half of the residences in the capital city of Jackson became empty due to its inhabitants seeking refuge from the disease. By the end of the year, 700 cases of yellow fever were diagnosed in New Orleans and the disease had taken 200 lives. The Yellow fever epidemic only got worse when the Cuba’s War of Independence broke out. The war provided ideal conditions for the spread of the disease in Havana. As such, the fear surrounding the disease created reluctancy to enter the conflict. The influx of Spanish soldiers that had never experienced yellow fever led to a huge increase in cases of the disease.

=== Economic interests in Cuba ===
Cuba's several industries, including sugar and tobacco, benefited mainly from trade with the United States. However, tensions soon grew between the two countries as the United States started implementing policies that benefited their own markets and excluded Cuba.

=== Tobacco ===
The Cuban tobacco industry in the 19th century catered primarily to western markets like the United States. As the demand for tobacco grew the United States tobacco industry began to grow, as well as the European tobacco industry. The American Tobacco Company (ATC) and the Imperial Tobacco Company (ITC) began to monopolize and place tariffs to protect their markets, which hurt the Cuban tobacco industry. Taking control of the Cuban markets as a result of freeing Cuba from Spanish rule provided compelling reason to entering the war. Later, the ATC and ITC struck an agreement that said that Cuba and Puerto Rico were ATC lands. In 1930, the United States started mass-producing cigarettes thanks to the development of new machinery. These actions undercut Cuba's tobacco industry, where tobacco overproduction and lack of the U.S. patented machine for making cigarettes were both problems.

== Government support ==
=== President Grant ===
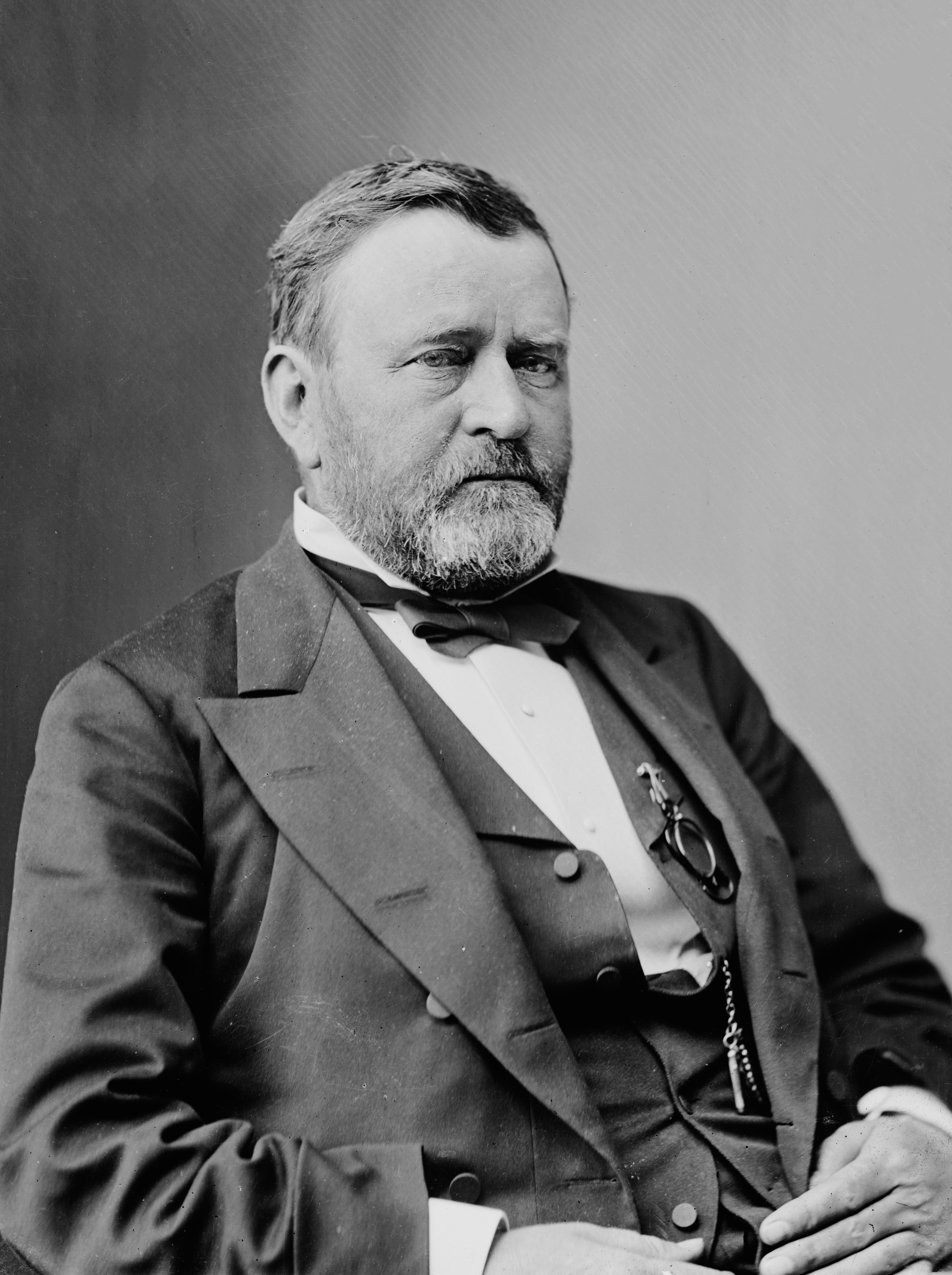
Ulysses S. Grant 1870-1880

With the commencement of the 10 Years war in 1868 various groups who supported Cuban independence applied pressure to President Ulysses S. Grant to enter the conflict in an attempts to aid Cuba. Many looked to the united states as an emancipatory power that after recently having freed its own slaves, would fight for the cause of freedom in Cuba as well. This included groups such as the Cuban Anti-Slavery Committee and Cubans who had immigrated to the United States. Rather than directly intervene in Cuba, Grant instead proposed the annexation of Santo Domingo (Dominican Republic). This was done in the name of Monroe Doctrine with Grant making the claim that the annexation would provide an advantageous position to combat slavery in Cuba. It's unclear how this affected the conflict in Cuba. One of the most influential contributors to Grant's policy on the war were the government officials he associated with. These included the figures such as Hamilton Fish, and George Henry Williams Despite domestic support of certain groups, Grant was reluctant to enter in the war and instead engaged in a sort of cold war with Spain. The administration came closest to entering the war with the Virginius Affair in which an American owned steamboat carrying supplies and weapons to Cuba was captured by the Spanish and the crew tried on land. The trial resulted in 53 executions of the Cuban, American, and British crewmen. The executions provoked outrage among the American public applying pressure on Grant to enter the war. Rather than enter the war however, Grant made several demands to the Spanish government. These were: the punishment of those involved in the executions, the returning of the ship and crew who had not been executed, and the payment in restitutions of 80,000$. Spain agreed to the terms and War was avoided.

=== Hamilton Fish ===
Hamilton Fish was the secretary of state at the time of the Grant administration. Fish played a pivotal role in keeping the United States out of the war, having a great influence on both President Grant and his cabinet. This allowed him to be one of the chief figures in the shaping of the foreign policy of the federal government towards Spain. He was appointed secretary of state by Grant in 1869 shortly after the commencement of the war. Throughout his career as secretary of state he focused on minimizing the financial costs of foreign policy in examples such as the ownership conflict of the U.S.S. Alabamaand most notably in Cuba. Fishs' aims in regard to Cuban the war were to both end the rebellion in Cuba, and to decrease the Spanish influence on the island while keeping the United States out of the Conflict. These aims combined with the instable nature of the war lead to the measured response by Fish in which he proposed that neutrality should be maintained despite public opinion that strongly deviated towards entering the war. Race also played a key role in Fish's Policy. He feared that overt involvement in the war would bring an influx of Cubans to the United States. He stated: "Cubans are of a different race and language, unaccustomed to our institutions or self-government; we would not wish to incorporate them with us." A such Fish maintained a neutral position throughout the war despite anti-American actions taken by Spain such as the executions of Americans by the Spanish Government in the Virginius Affair.
