= Frederick Rodgers =

Frederick W. Rodgers
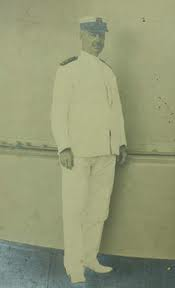
- Born: 3 October 1842; Havre de Grace, Maryland, U.S.
- Died: 3 November 1917 (aged 75); St. James, New York, U.S.
- Burial place: Rock Creek Cemetery; Washington, D.C., U.S.
- Relatives: Matthew C. Perry (grandfather)
- Military career
- Allegiance: United States of America
- Branch: United States Navy
- Service years: 1861–1904
- Rank: Rear admiral
- Commands: Delta (prize ship); USS Despatch; USS Adams; Receiving ship USS Independence; USS Philadelphia; Supervisor, Harbor of New York; USS Massachusetts; President, Board of Inspection and Survey; Asiatic Squadron; New York Navy Yard
- Conflicts: American Civil War; Union blockade; First Battle of Donaldsonville; Actions at Port Hudson and College Point, Louisiana; Spanish–American War; Philippine–American War

Signature
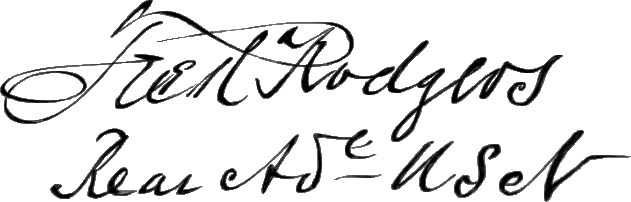

Rear Admiral Frederick W. Rodgers (3 October 1842 – 3 November 1917) was an officer in the United States Navy. He fought in the American Civil War and rose to be the last commander of the Asiatic Squadron. He was a grandson of U.S. Navy Commodore Matthew C. Perry.

== Naval career ==
Rodgers was born in Havre de Grace, Maryland, on 3 October 1842, a son of Robert Smith Rodgers (1809–1891) and the former Sarah Perry (1818–1905), a daughter of U.S. Navy Commodore Matthew C. Perry (1794–1858). His brother, John Augustus Rodgers, also became a rear admiral in the Navy.

He was appointed as an acting midshipman on 25 September 1857 and attended the United States Naval Academy in Annapolis, Maryland, from 1857 to 1861, completing his studies just after the April 1861 outbreak of the American Civil War.

Promoted to midshipman on 1 June 1861 and to acting master on 10 June 1861, Rodgers' first assignment was aboard the sailing frigate USS Santee in the Gulf of Mexico as part of the Union blockade of the Confederate States of America. After Santee captured her second blockade runner – the hermaphrodite brig Delta carrying a cargo of salt from Liverpool, England – on 27 October 1861, Rodgers was placed aboard Delta in command of her prize crew.

Rodgers was promoted to lieutenant on 16 July 1862 and from 1862 to 1863 served aboard the gunboat USS Kineo, seeing action along the Mississippi River in Louisiana at the First Battle of Donaldsonville on 9 August 1862 and in actions at Port Hudson and College Point. He transferred to the screw steamer USS Grand Gulf in 1863 and served aboard her in the North Atlantic Blockading Squadron from 1863 to 1864 and the West Gulf Blockading Squadron from 1864 to 1865, and Grand Gulf successfully intercepted a number of blockade runners during his tour. In 1865 he served aboard the steam sloop-of-war USS Seminole.

After the war, Rodgers joined the Military Order of the Loyal Legion of the United States—a military society of officers who had served in the Union armed forces.

Promoted to lieutenant commander on 26 July 1866, Rodgers served aboard the newly commissioned screw steamer USS Chattanooga for a short time in 1866 before reporting for duty later that year aboard the newly recommissioned screw sloop-of-war USS Sacramento. After Sacramento ran aground and was wrecked in the Bay of Bengal on 6 June 1867, Rodgers served aboard the steamer USS Michigan on the Great Lakes from 1868 to 1869 before duty in the North Pacific Squadron successively aboard the screw steamer USS Pensacola and sailing sloop-of-war USS St. Mary's in 1870 and the steam sloop-of-war USS Saranac from 1871 to 1872.

After leaving the North Pacific Squadron, Rodgers performed ordnance duty at the Washington Navy Yard in Washington, D.C., in 1872. He was the first commanding officer of the newly acquired steamer USS Despatch from 1873 to 1876, during which time the ship was engaged in special service. He was promoted to commander on 4 February 1875.

After duty as a lighthouse inspector on the Great Lakes from 1876 to 1877, Rodgers was the commanding officer of the screw gunboat USS Adams in the South Atlantic Squadron and later in the Pacific Squadron from 1878 to 1879. He then served a second tour as a lighthouse inspector, this time at Philadelphia, Pennsylvania, from 1881 to 1883 before a tour from 1883 to 1886 as commanding officer of the receiving ship USS Independence at Mare Island Navy Yard in Vallejo, California. He was a lighthouse inspector again from 1888 to September 1890, in charge of the Lighthouse Depot, and was promoted to captain on 26 or 28 February 1890 (sources vary).

Rodgers returned to sea as commanding officer of the protected cruiser USS Philadelphia from September 1890 to July 1892, then served as Supervisor of the Harbor of New York from July 1892 to September 1893. His next tour was as Captain of the Yard at the New York Navy Yard in Brooklyn, New York, from 1893 to 1896. He took command of the new battleship USS Massachusetts as her first commanding officer when she was commissioned on 10 June 1896. During the Spanish–American War he commanded the coastal monitor USS Puritan which operated in both the Cuban and Puerto Rican Campaigns. Following the war, he served as President of the Board of Inspection and Survey from 1 December 1898 until 1901, being promoted to commodore on 25 September or 25 December 1898 (sources vary) and to rear admiral on 3 March 1899.

In May 1901, Rodgers became Senior Squadron Commander within the Asiatic Squadron, and, on 1 March 1902, he became the commander of the entire Asiatic Squadron, which was engaged in combat during the Philippine–American War at the time. He was the squadron's last commander, as at the end of his tour on 29 October 1902 the Asiatic Squadron was abolished and its responsibilities were assumed by the new United States Asiatic Fleet.

While in the Asiatic Squadron, Rodgers was at the center of a legal case, Frederick Rodgers v. United States, involving a claim Rodgers made for additional pay he believed was due him and eight other rear admirals in the wake of the passage by the United States Congress of the Navy Personnel Act of 3 March 1899. The Supreme Court of the United States heard arguments in the case on 26 February 1902 and ruled against Rodgers on 26 April 1902.

Rodgers was commandant of the New York Navy Yard from 1 April 1903 until 3 October 1904, when he retired from the Navy upon reaching the mandatory retirement age of 62.

== Retirement and death ==
In retirement, Rodgers lived in Washington, D.C., for a time. He was involved in various activities, such as serving in 1907 as senior member of a naval board considering land boundaries at Honolulu in the Territory of Hawaii.

Rodgers died of a stroke at his home in St. James on Long Island, New York, on 3 November 1917. He was survived by his wife and a son.

Rogers is buried at Rock Creek Cemetery in Washington, D.C.

== Notes ==
Military offices
Preceded by George C. Remey	Commander, Asiatic Squadron; 1 March 1902 – 29 October 1902	Succeeded by none
