= Battle of Donaldsonville =

Battle of Donaldsonville may refer to:

- First Battle of Donaldsonville, a battle in the American Civil War that took place on August 9, 1862, at Donaldsonville, Louisiana.
- Second Battle of Donaldsonville, a battle in the American Civil War that took place on June 28, 1863, at Donaldsonville, Louisiana.
