= Enrique Boniche y Taengua =

Spanish army general (1829-1891)

Enrique Boniche
- Born: Enrique Boniche y Taengua; April 27, 1829; Valencia, Spain
- Died: 1891 (aged 61–62)
- Military career
- Branch: Spanish Army
- Rank: Colonel
- Commands: Las Tunas
- Conflicts: Dominican Restoration War; Ten Years' War; First Battle of Las Tunas
- Awards: Royal and Military Order of Saint Hermenegild (September 21, 1876); Order of Military Merit (1878)

Enrique Boniche (April 27, 1829 – 1891) was a prominent Spanish military general who served in the Dominican Restoration War and the Ten Years' War in Cuba.

== Early life ==
Enrique Boniche y Taengua was born on April 27, 1829, in Valencia, Spain in the 19th century.

After enrolling in the General Military Academy in 1844, he was promoted to second lieutenant in 1848 and reached the rank of captain in 1854.

== Dominican Restoration War ==
At the onset of the Dominican Restoration War, he went to the Dominican Republic with the Spanish Army.

Enrique Boniche y Tuenga engaged in action at Santiago de los Caballeros on September 6, 1863. The Dominicans besieged the Fort San Luis and the restorative government of Jose Antonio Salcedo was established in Santiago, on September 14, 1863. The Cuban garrison retreated to Santo Domingo. Taking part in several operations, Boniche was promoted to captain by October 1863. He was the second-in-command of the 2nd Isabel II Hunters Battalion (Spanish: Batallón Cazadores de Isabel II No. 2). His duties included operations from Santo Domingo to the capture of Baní.

He eventually evacuated from Hispaniola and arrived in Cuba. By 1864, he was assigned to the Captaincy General of Cuba under Gen. Domingo Dulce. He served in the First Provisional Battalion of the Hunters Battalions in the Spanish Army.

In 1865, he was a commander in the First Battalion of the 4th Regiment of Naples (Spanish: Regimiento de Nápoles No. 4) where he reported to Col. Manuel Salgado y Amenedo.

== Ten Years' War ==
He served as a colonel under Captain General Arsenio Martínez Campos during Cuba's Ten Years' War that began in 1868.

By 1869 he was promoted to lieutenant colonel and appointed as the second chief commander of the 4th San Quintín Hunters Battalion (Spanish: Batallón de Cazadores de San Quintín No. 4).

=== Battle of Las Tunas ===
Enrique Boniche participated in the first Battle of Las Tunas on August 16, 1869, defending against the Cuban Liberation Army commanded by General Manuel de Quesada. Boniche was the leader of the Spanish garrison in Las Tunas. Col. José Vincente de Valera witnessed a large group of Cubans advancing toward Las Tunas after leading a reconnaissance of mounted cavalry ordered by Gen. Boniche. Following the battle, the Liberation Army briefly took control of the area before retreating when reports of 1000 Spanish reinforcements surfaced.

Enrique Boniche launched an attack in January 1871 against rebel forces on La Gloria Hill near Sierra de Cubitas in Camagüey Province. His precise blockade of their exits led the insurgents to their deaths by jumping from cliffs and mountains.

In 1873 he commanded the 3rd Infantry Regiment of the Crown (Spanish: Regimiento Infantería de la Corona No. 3) consisting of two battalions. He was stationed in El Cobre in 1875, which is situated in Santiago de Cuba Province. The garrison included the Crown regiment under his command, as well as Counter-guerrilla forces from Bueycito and the Tercios de Cañizal, a Spanish military unit.

On September 21, 1876 the division general was the recipient of the Military Order of Saint Hermenegild. By 1877, he had risen to the rank of brigadier general in the Santa Clara jurisdiction of Cuba. His military achievements were further recognized in 1878 when he was awarded the Order of Military Merit.

== Puerto Rico ==
On May 21, 1890 he was promoted to division general under Francisco de Asís, Duke of Cádiz and named Second corporal of the Captaincy General of Puerto Rico and Sub-inspector of the island's troops.

== Death ==
Enrique Boniche y Taengua died in 1891.

== Orders, decorations and medals ==
- Grand Cross of the Royal and Military Order of Saint Hermenegild (September 21, 1876)
- Order of Military Merit (1878)
