= De Valera (surname) =

De Valera or Valera is a surname of Spanish origin. It may refer to:

- Cipriano de Valera (1531–1602), Spanish Protestant refugee
- Diego de Valera (1412–1488), Spanish writer
- Éamon de Valera (1882–1975), Irish statesman
- José Vincente de Valera (1822–1899), Spanish Army officer
- Máirin de Valéra, (1912–1984), Irish phycologist
- Rúaidhrí de Valera (1916–1978), Irish archaeologist
- Síle de Valera (born 1954), Irish Fianna Fáil politician
- Sinéad de Valera (1878–1975), wife of Éamon de Valera
- Vivion de Valera (1910–1982), Irish Fianna Fáil politician

== See also ==
- Valera (disambiguation), which includes a list of people with the surname
- Varela
