= USS Despatch (1873) =

1873–1891 American steamer ship

Coordinates: 37.9783°N 75.2467°W

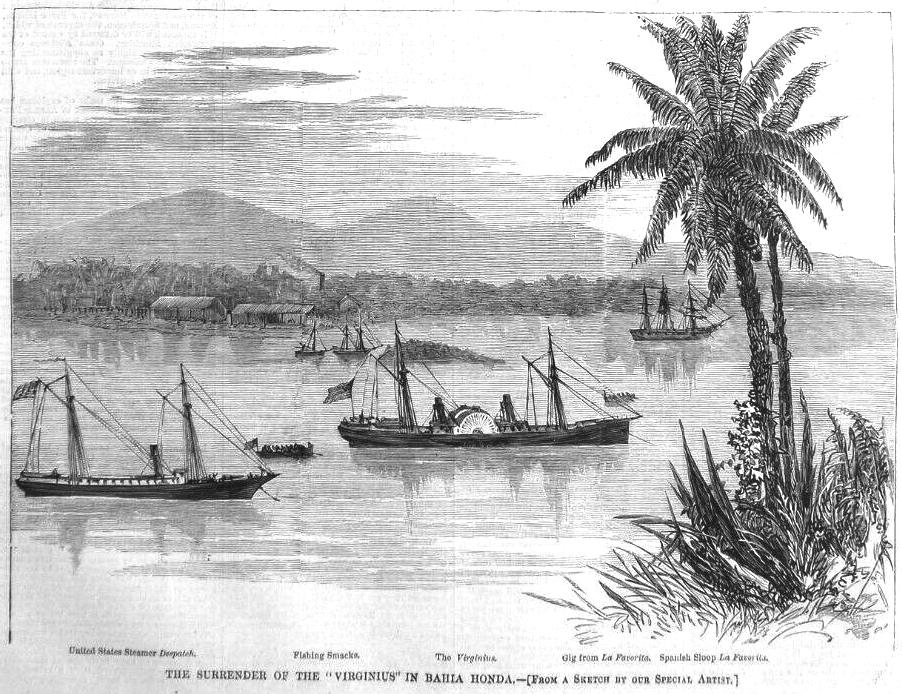
- Despatch at the surrender of the Virginius in Bahia Honda

History

United States
- Name: USS Despatch
- Namesake: Despatch: As a verb, to send off or away, to dispose of speedily, to execute quickly. As a noun, a message sent with speed.
- Acquired: November 1873
- Commissioned: 23 November 1873
- Decommissioned: 9 July 1879
- Recommissioned: 8 June 1880
- Decommissioned: 23 September 1880
- Recommissioned: 19 October 1880
- Fate: Wrecked 10 October 1891
- Notes: Previously the commercial steamer America

General characteristics
- Type: Steamer
- Displacement: 560 long tons (570 t)
- Length: 198 ft (60 m)
- Beam: 27 ft (8.2 m)
- Draft: 12 ft 4 in (3.76 m)
- Propulsion: Steam engine
- Speed: 12 kn (14 mph; 22 km/h)
- Complement: 81
- Armament: 3 × 20 pdr (9.1 kg) guns

The third USS Despatch was a United States Navy steamer in commission from 1873 to 1891.

== Acquisition and commissioning ==
Despatch was the commercial steamer America when the U.S. Navy purchased her in November 1873 at New York City. She was commissioned on 23 November 1873, Lieutenant Commander Frederick Rodgers in command.

== The Virginius Affair, 1873 ==
Purchased for dispatch duty because of her speed, Despatch was assigned to the North Atlantic Squadron and joined the fleet in December 1873 at Key West, Florida, in anticipation of war with Spain over the seizure of the American filibustering steamer Virginius by the Spanish Navy corvette Tornado. The Spanish had taken Virginius into port at Santiago de Cuba in Cuba and summarily condemned her, with 53 of her passengers and crew executed (see Virginius Affair). After lengthy diplomatic negotiations, 102 survivors were delivered on board the U.S. Navy sloop-of-war Juniata, and Virginius was ordered to be turned over to Captain W. D. Whiting, Chief of Staff of the North Atlantic Squadron. Despatch carried Captain Whiting to Bahia Honda, Cuba, to take charge of Virginius, and took Virginius in tow for Key West.

Despatch remained with the fleet, serving as a dispatch vessel and participating in squadron drills until arriving at the Washington Navy Yard in Washington, D.C., which became her new base on 24 April 1874.

== Operations from Washington, D.C., 1874–77 ==
From 1874 to 1877, Despatch carried out special duty assignments from her base at Washington, D.C., and at various times operated with the North Atlantic Squadron along the United States East Coast and in the Gulf of Mexico. She was kept ready for use as a dispatch and relief vessel, and on several occasions transported the United States Secretary of the Navy and United States Senate committees. She also towed monitors from one point to another and experimented with spar torpedoes at Newport, Rhode Island.

== Operations in the Ottoman Empire, 1877–79 ==
Despatch departed on 20 April 1877 for the eastern Mediterranean and a special assignment with the United States Embassy at Constantinople in the Ottoman Empire. Arriving there on 14 June, Despatch carried dispatches and transported the American minister to the Ottoman Empire, which was in turmoil because of war with the Russian Empire and internal political unrest. Despatch was detached early in 1879, and returned to Washington, D.C., where she was decommissioned on 9 July 1879.

== Cadet training, presidential yacht duty, and special assignments, 1880–91 ==
After extensive repairs, Despatch was recommissioned on 8 June 1880 for use as a training ship and cruised along the U.S. East Coast with cadet engineers from the United States Naval Academy at Annapolis, Maryland, on board.

Despatch was again out of commission at Washington, D.C., from 23 September to 19 October 1880, then operated principally in the Potomac River and the Chesapeake Bay and along the U.S. East Coast from Norfolk, Virginia, to Maine until 1891, carrying out special assignments. She was frequently used by the President of the United States as the first presidential yacht, as well as by the Secretary of the Navy and other members of the United States Cabinet, Congressional committees, members of naval boards conducting inspections, and for varied ceremonial duties. One of the most important of these ceremonial events occurred on 28 October 1886 when she transported President Grover Cleveland, his private secretary, and three members of his cabinet, to and from Bedloe's Island in New York Harbor for the dedication and unveiling of the Statue of Liberty on 28 October 1886. Over the years, she also carried despatches and men to the fleet and along the U.S. East Coast, towed into port or destroyed damaged ships and wrecks, and escorted new ships during their sea trials. From 12 December 1881 to 3 June 1882, Despatch operated at Hispaniola to conduct hydrographic surveys of Samaná Bay and the Yuna River.

== Loss ==
After carrying Secretary of the Navy Benjamin F. Tracy on a cruise along the New England coast to review the fleet in August 1891, Despatch put into New York City, from which she sailed for Washington, D.C., on 9 October 1891. Early on the morning of 10 October, in a gale, she was wrecked on Assateague Island off the Virginia coast, near Chincoteague. With the aid of men from the Assateague Lifesaving Station of the United States Life-Saving Service, all of Despatch's crew got ashore safely.

The wreck of Despatch was sold for salvage on 12 November 1891.
