= Joseph Fry (captain) =

Confederate officer (1826–1873)

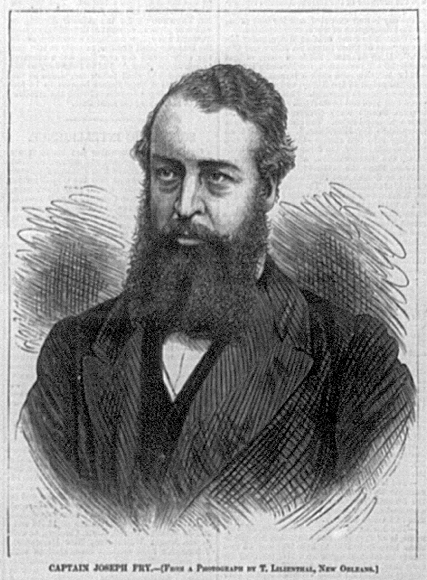
- Born: June 14, 1826; Tampa Bay, Florida
- Died: November 7, 1873 (aged 47); Santiago de Cuba, Cuba
- Alma mater: United States Naval Academy
- Military career
- Allegiance: United States; Confederate States; Cuba
- Branch: U.S. Navy; Confederate Navy; Cuban Liberation Army
- Rank: Captain
- Conflicts: Mexican–American War; Siege of Veracruz; American Civil War; Ten Years' War; Virginius Affair

Joseph Fry (June 14, 1826 – November 7, 1873) was a pre-Civil War U.S. Naval Officer, a Confederate Civil War veteran, and, post-war, commander of the ill-fated Cuban smuggling vessel Virginius.

== Early life ==
Joseph Fry was born on June 14, 1826, near Tampa Bay, Florida. According to a non-scholarly 19th century biography, which draws heavily on his personal journals, he moved about a great deal in his youth, spending time with relatives in Pensacola (Florida), Mobile (Alabama), and Albany (New York), and attending a boarding school at Ballston Spa, New York.

== Service in the U.S. Navy ==
Eager to join the US Navy, in 1841 he ostensibly managed to arrange a meeting with President John Tyler, who was impressed enough to personally grant him an appointment as a midshipman in the U.S. Navy. His biography, and other sources drawing from it, state that he was part of the second class to graduate (in 1847) from the "United States Naval School at Annapolis," but there was no naval school (or other presence) at Annapolis until 1845, and it is not clear how much of his formal training took place elsewhere and prior to that date. It is known that, as a midshipman, he lived for a time at the New York Navy Yard, aboard the receiving ship North Carolina, and went on training cruises on a number of other vessels, including one which ended with the burning of the sidewheeler USS Missouri off Gibraltar in 1843. In 1847 he was promoted to the rank of passed midshipman (precursor to the rank of ensign).

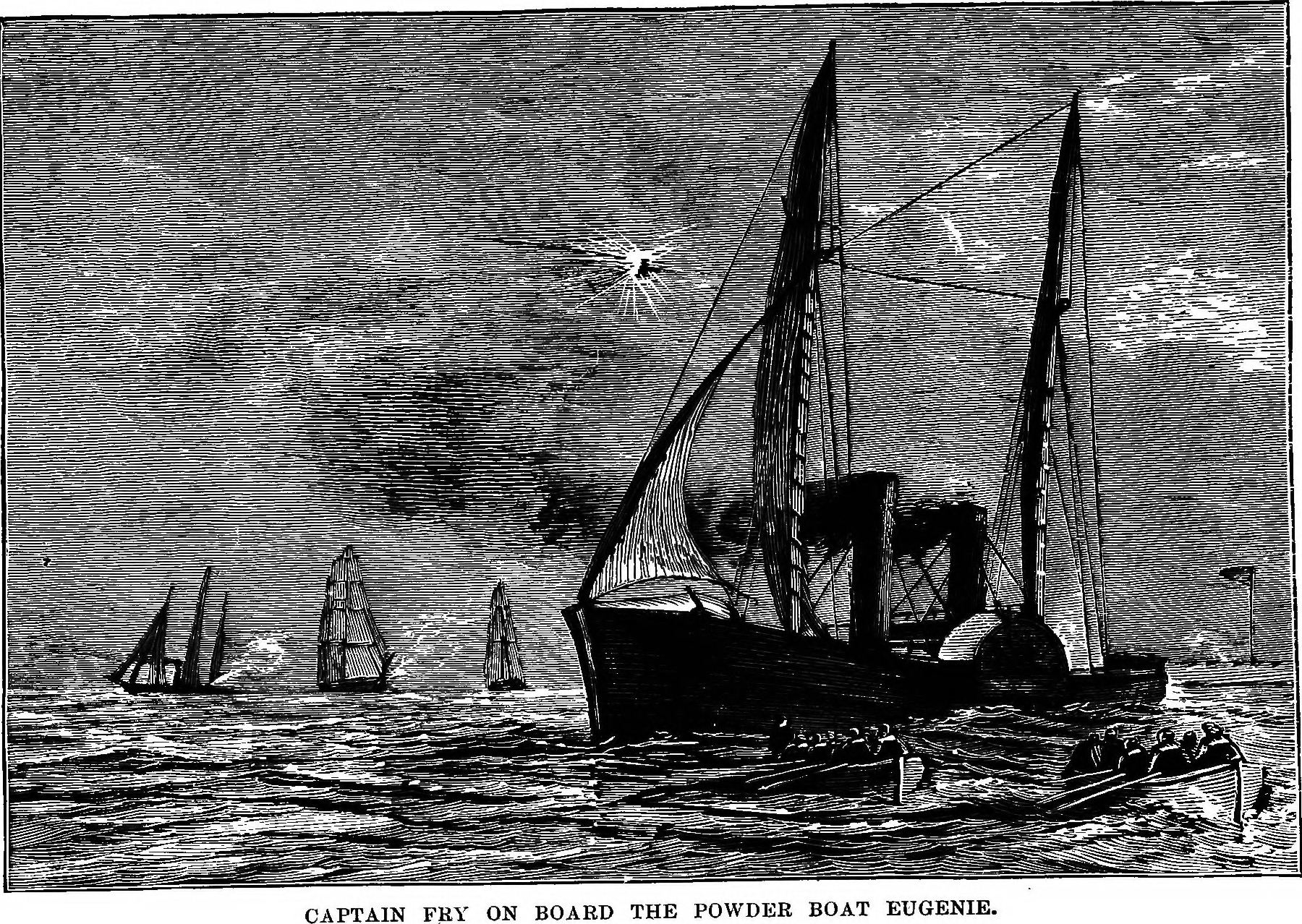
Captain Fry on board the Powder Boat Eugenie

Fry's first experience in combat came in March 1847 while serving aboard USS Vixen, supporting the American landings at Veracruz during the Mexican-American War. Upon his return home, he served on vessels of the United States Coast and Geodetic Survey for several years, serving aboard the John Y. Mason, the Robert J. Walker, and, later, as commander of the schooner William A. Graham. In 1851 he returned to Navy duty, embarking on the sailing sloop-of-war Plymouth for a four-year voyage to the Far East. One source states that, shortly after his return, on 14 September 1855, Fry was promoted to Master and, on the following day, to Lieutenant. He then spent the next two years at the Pensacola Navy Yard before again drawing sea duty, this time aboard USS Vandalia, again headed for the Pacific. This voyage did not go well for Fry: departing the Portsmouth (New Hampshire) Navy Yard at the end of November, 1857, while at sea he was diagnosed with a heart condition that left him unable to continue with his duties, and in June 1858 he was put ashore at Panama Bay, with orders to return home, and a recommendation that he be put on the retired list. Returning home, he received an appointment to the Lighthouse Department of the Gulf Coast, a post he held until January 1861, when the secession of Louisiana from the Union caused him to resign his commission.

== Confederate Service ==
After leaving the U.S. Navy Fry joined the Confederate States Army, the nascent navy not yet having absorbed all the officers who had already become available. This soon changed, however, and in March 1861 he was commissioned a Lieutenant in the Confederate States Navy, serving on the lower Mississippi, first as an aide to the aging Commodore Lawrence Rousseau, and later commanding a small steamer, CSS Ivy. This vessel served largely as a dispatch boat and observer during the October 1861 battle at the Head of the Passes, in the Mississippi Delta. Later, in March 1862, Fry was sent upstream to the vicinity of New Madrid, Missouri and given a new command, CSS Maurepas. In March and April Confederate naval forces, including Maurepas, participated in the unsuccessful defenses of New Madrid and Island No. 10. In June, after the capture of those locations by Union forces, several Confederate ships (under Fry's command, according to his biographer) retired up the White River to oppose Union Navy penetration into territory west of the Mississippi, ultimately sinking the ships to close the channel and creating a short-lived defensive position using their guns. Fry was wounded and then captured during these last operations; he was, however, soon exchanged and sent to Georgia to convalesce with his family.

Upon regaining his health, Fry was placed in command of the government blockade runner Eugenie. This vessel ran the blockade several times between March and October of 1863 before being returned, damaged, to Britain. Fry subsequently served on a naval examining board and then as an agent of the Confederate Navy in Bermuda before moving on to Scotland, where, in late 1864, he took command of a new blockade runner, named after his wife, the Agnes E. Fry.

After making several runs in the new vessel, in the spring of 1865 Fry was sent to Mobile, initially to make one more run through the blockade, in the steamer Red Gauntlet; but after that vessel had been loaded, his superiors decided that, with the situation dire, he should instead transfer over to a proper warship, CSS Morgan, to engage the Union Navy directly. After some skirmishing against Union vessels in Mobile Bay, on May 5, 1865, weeks after Appomattox, Fry was ordered to surrender his vessel and did so.

== Postbellum career ==
=== Limited Opportunities in New Orleans ===
With the conclusion of the American Civil War in 1865, Fry found himself living with his wife and, reportedly, seven children in New Orleans, highly regarded in the community but nonetheless underemployed. Service at sea was not an option for Comfederate veterans, and a job on a maritime inspection board was undermined by a Reconstructionist state legislature which prohibited it from doing its job. Work as an inventor, developing machinery and techniques for processing animal and vegetable matter using superheated steam, came to nought because of a lack of funding. Two attempts to operate rooming houses failed because this type of business was too far outside his experience. Work helping to establish a Louisiana polytechnical academy proved beneficial, but did not pay.

=== The Virginius Expedition ===
In July 1873, Captain Fry went to New York in hopes of finding employment on an ocean steamer. However, his considerable experience ultimately recommended him to Cuban General Manuel de Quesada y Loynaz, a leader of Cuban rebels fighting for independence during the Ten Years' War, who offered Fry a professional job, smuggling personnel and supplies to support the rebel cause. Accordingly Fry left New York on October 4, 1873, for Kingston, Jamaica, to take command of the former Confederate blockade runner Virginius.

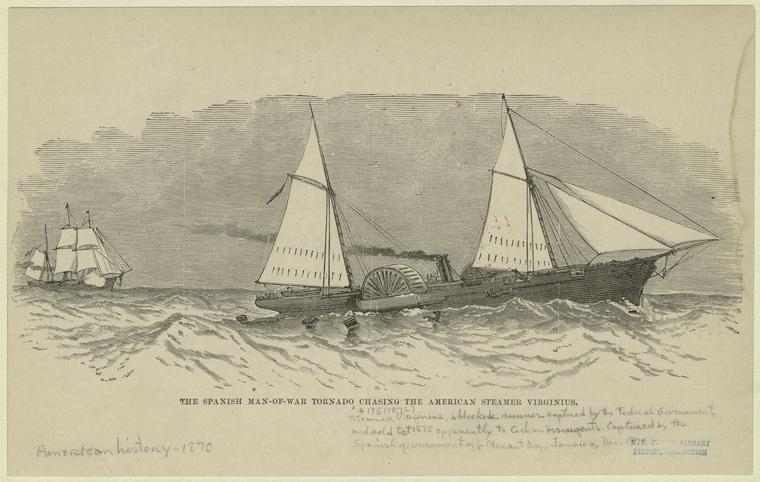
The Spanish Man-of-War Tornado Chasing the American Steamer Virginius

The expedition was led under the direction of Mambí general Bernabé Varona; and rebel leaders Jesús del Sol, W.A.C. Ryan, and Pedro de Céspedes were among the passengers. While in port, the Virginius was repaired and coaled at the expense of the Cubans. On October 24, 1873, the vessel left Kingston Harbor under Fry's command. On 30 October the Spanish consul in Kingston reported the vessel to Spanish authorities in Cuba for its suspicious movements. On the following day the Spanish corvette Tornado, having been dispatched by Spanish General Juan N. Burriel to investigate, spotted Fry's vessel and gave chase, forcing Fry to flee back towards Jamaica. Fry instructed Ryan and Varona to throw the heavy ammunition, horses, artillery, and gun carriages overboard to lighten the load of the steamer during the pursuit, but the Spanish vessel was nonetheless able to close with Virginius. Twelve miles from the safety of British waters, Tornado fired a blank shot as a warning; and when Fry failed to respond, the Spanish captain followed up by firing several live shells, which whistled over the Virginius. At that point, Fry realized he could not escape and stopped his vessel between Cabo Cruz and Santiago; the Spanish captain then dispatched two armed boats carrying boarding parties to demand Fry's surrender. Presenting his documentation to the boarding officer, Fry questioned the legality of his ship's seizure. The Spanish nonetheless seized the vessel and sailed it to Santiago de Cuba, arriving on November 1. Over the next few days, over the objections of local United States and British consular officials, all aboard the Virginius--the crew members, the insurgent leaders, and all other passengers--were tried as pirates by a tribunal on board the Tornado and then confined to the city jail.

== Death ==
On November 7, 1873, Joseph Fry was executed by firing squad along with 36 members of the Virginius crew. With four other individuals having already been executed, and another dozen to follow, this brought the overall count to 53 dead.
