= Pedro de Céspedes y del Castillo =

Cuban revolutionary and landowner (1825-1873)

Pedro de Céspedes

Personal details
- Born: Pedro María de Céspedes y del Castillo; January 31, 1825 Bayamo, Oriente Province, Captaincy General of Cuba, Spanish Empire
- Died: November 4, 1873 (aged 48) Santiago de Cuba, Captaincy General of Cuba, Spanish Empire
- Resting place: Santa Ifigenia Cemetery

Military service
- Battles/wars: Ten Years' War; Virginius Affair

Pedro de Céspedes (1825-1873) was a Cuban revolutionary and landowner who was executed in the Virginius Affair during the Ten Years' War.

== Early life ==
Pedro de Céspedes y del Castillo was born in Bayamo, Oriente Province, Spanish Cuba on January 31, 1825. He was a member of a prominent Cuban family and the younger brother of the first President of the Republic of Cuba in Arms Carlos Manuel de Céspedes. Pedro de Céspedes was educated in the Bayamo region in Eastern Cuba.

In the 1860s, he became a member of the Masonic Order of Buena Fe of Manzanillo.

== Ten Years' War ==
He backed the revolutionary cause led by his brother to achieve Cuban independence from Spanish colonial rule. His brother Carlos coordinated meetings with various groups to plan an insurrection against the Spanish government. Amid the earlier-than-expected start of the Ten Years' War, Pedro de Céspedes signed 'El Acta de Independencia' in Oriente on October 10, 1868, with 15 other signatories, including his brother and Bartolomé Masó. In April 1869, Pedro's brother was elected as the first President of the Republic of Cuba in Arms in Guáimaro.

In 1872, Céspedes left the Island of Cuba with his family in a canoe, relocating to Kingston, Jamaica.

By late October 1873, his older sibling Carlos Manuel was deposed as president in Cuba.

=== The Virginius Expedition ===
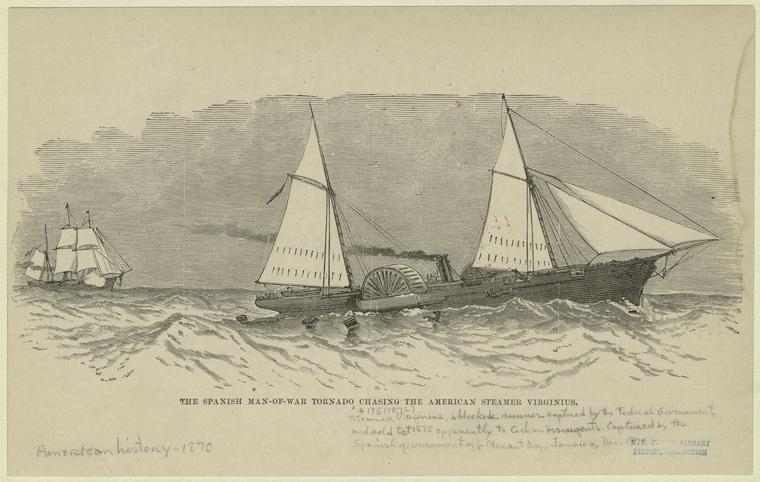
The Spanish Man-of-War Tornado Chasing the American Steamer Virginius

On what would be his last journey to his homeland, Pedro de Céspedes was involved in the Virginius Affair. Meeting the ill-fated steamer at the port of Kingston, he boarded as a non-combatant to head back to Cuba. On October 31, 1873, the Virginius was intercepted near Jamaica by the Spanish cruiser Tornado who was alerted of the American blockade runner. The list of captives included Céspedes, Bernabé Varona, Jesús del Sol, William A.C. Ryan, and Joseph Fry, the steamer's captain. On November 2, 1873, a court-martial aboard the Tornado led to the trial and conviction of the men for piracy.

== Death ==
On November 4, 1873, in Santiago de Cuba, Pedro de Céspedes and three others faced execution by firing squad, ordered by Juan Nepomuceno Burriel. While kneeling alongside Jesús del Sol, he was shot in the back. His final resting place was the city of Santiago de Cuba's Santa Ifigenia Cemetery.
