= First Battle of Las Tunas =

1869 battle of the Ten Years' War

Battle of Las Tunas
- Part of Ten Years' War
| Date | August 16, 1869 |
| Location | Las Tunas, Oriente Province, Captaincy General of Cuba |
| Result | Spanish victory |

Belligerents
| Cuban rebels | Spain |

Commanders and leaders
| Gen. Manuel de Quesada; Brig. Gen. Bernabé Varona; Col. Enrique Loynaz; Col. Eduardo Montejo | Col. Enrique Boniche; Col. José Vincente de Valera; Col. Jose Del la Torre; Capt. Martín Abranco; Col. Méndez Benegasi |

Strength
| 630+ mambises | 450–800 soldiers |

Casualties and losses
| 40 killed, 85 wounded | 100+ killed, 78 wounded |

The Battle of Las Tunas was a military engagement of the Ten Years' War. It took place on August 16, 1869, in the city of Las Tunas, Oriente in Cuba. It was organized to rescue families of Cubans that were held in the town.

Four brigades of 140 men each formed the Cuban force, bolstered by Gen. Manuel de Quesada's 30-man personal escort led by Brig. Gen. Bernabé Varona and President Carlos Manuel de Céspedes's 40-man guard. The Spanish garrison under the leadership of Col. Enrique Boniche y Taengua reportedly consisted of 450 troops.

== The Battle ==
In the early hours of August 16, 1869, commanding the garrison of Las Tunas, was Col. Enrique Boniche. Boniche chose a battalion led by Col. José Vincente de Valera to seek out the movements of revolutionary forces that were marching from different points on the roads to Las Tunas. After leading a reconnaissance of mounted cavalry sent by Col. Enrique Boniche, Valera saw a sizable group of Cubans advancing toward Las Tunas. The patrol unit was engaged by the Cuban Liberation Army force under Gen. Manuel de Quesada. After retreating to the city, insurgents closely tailing, opened fire upon his men and the surrounding city. They assaulted it, simultaneously, on four sides of the compass, and began the fight with deafening yells. It was held back for some time by an advance guard, operating under the orders of Capt. Martín Abranco. The Spanish commander Boniche ordered 100 cavalrymen out of the city, and to make for the nearest garrisons for reinforcements. The second in command, José de Valera, attempted to break the lines of Quesada's forces on the Santiago de Cuba road at the enemy's rear and met a distratous engagement. He continued to contest the street leading into the town on the south. Martin Alesance commanded the Spanish forces on the Bayamo road and area that led to the Grand Plaza. Col. Jose Del la Torre commanded on the Holgüin side.

The Liberation Army pressed forward with Parrott guns. The artillery first started from the Mercader Hill upon the Church of Jesus, where a company of Spanish riflemen were stationed upon the towers and on the roof. The two towers were riddled destroying a pillar, the men were dislodged, and Quesada led a column of his army through the southern gate into the city. The entire Spanish garrison retreated into the Grand Plaza of Las Tunas. The Spanish commander José Ramonz y Navarro was ordered with a small force to defend the government house.

The forces commanded by Gen. Manuel de Quesada laid siege to the important military plaza of Las Tunas. While the Spaniards were hemmed within the plaza, the Cubans secured $300,000 worth of stores of all kinds. Half his command kept Boniche's army engaged, while the other half looted the groceries, warehouses, and retail stores.

== Aftermath ==
Nine hours after the battle had begun, Gen. Quesada ordered a retreat from the city when reports from his scouts from the Bayamo and Holguin roads, reported Spanish reinforcements en route for Boniche. Col. Méndez Benegasi arrived from Holgüin to provide relief to the Spanish garrison. Despite the Mambí Army's initial success, the Spanish forces managed to withstand the assault. After igniting the section of the town they had captured, the Cubans withdrew.
