= Jesús del Sol =

Cuban army colonel (1835-1873)

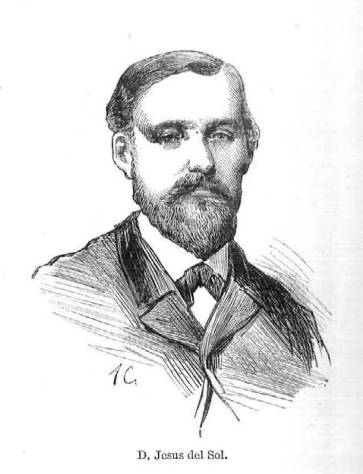
- Born: Jesús del Sol y Cordero; 1835; Cienfuegos, Captaincy General of Cuba, Spanish Empire
- Died: November 4, 1873; Santiago de Cuba, Captaincy General of Cuba, Spanish Empire
- Burial place: Santa Ifigenia Cemetery
- Military career
- Allegiance: Cuba
- Branch: Cuban Army
- Rank: General
- Conflicts: Ten Years' War; Battle of Yaguaramas; Battle of Guatao; Virginius Affair

Jesús del Sol (1835 - November 4, 1873) was a Cuban statesman and high-ranking Cuban military figure who was executed in the Virginius Affair during the Ten Years' War.

== Early life ==
Jesús del Sol was born in Cienfuegos, Las Villas in Cuba in 1835. His parents were wealthy planters, and he had a sizable property of coffee plantations, horses and cattle before the first independence war.

== Ten Years' War ==
When the Ten Years' War commenced, Jesús del Sol burned the family plantation, approximately worth $50,000. Enrolling in the ranks of the Cuban Liberation Army in 1869, he fought for Cuba's freedom as a mambí captain under the general command of Federico Fernández Cavada.

Jesús Del Sol commanded the Colón district. In 1870, his command of 1,400 men was reported to be encamped between Colón, Maragua, and Palmillas.

In the spring of 1871, while ill and alone in a hut near Santiago, a man brought him coffee with the intent to claim the bounty offered by the Spanish government for his death. He managed to shoot and kill the attacker with a revolver. Jesús del Sol was subsequently captured by Spanish authorities and sent to Spain to be imprisoned, on the condition that he should never return to Cuba. Escaping Spain, he fled to the United States and employed himself in furthering the interests of Cuba. While in New York, he was gradually preparing to reunite with his army in Cuba and had been anticipating an expedition.

=== The Virginius Expedition ===
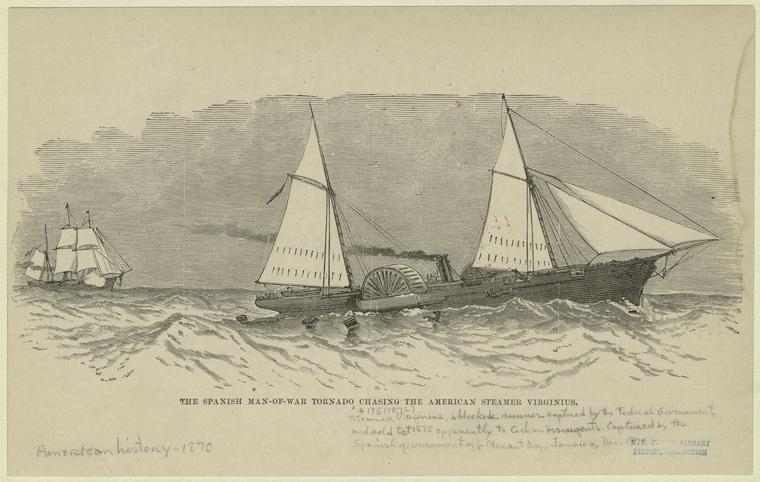
The Spanish Man-of-War Tornado Chasing the American Steamer Virginius

Jesús del Sol was involved in the filibustering Virginius expedition, that occurred during the Ten Years' War. On October 31, 1873, the Virginius, a North American blockade runner, was captured near the Jamaican coast by the Spanish corvette Tornado. Among those captured were Mambí General Bernabé Varona, Jesús del Sol, William A.C. Ryan, Pedro de Céspedes (the brother of Carlos Manuel de Céspedes), and Joseph Fry, who commanded the steamer.

A court-martial was held on the Tornado on November 2, 1873, and the men were tried as pirates.

== Death ==
On November 4, 1873, in Santiago de Cuba, Jesús del Sol was executed by firing squad along with three other expedition leaders. Forced to kneel with Pedro Céspedes, he was shot in the back while in the position. He was later buried in the Santa Ifigenia Cemetery.
