= José Vincente de Valera =

Spanish army general (1822–1899)

- Born: José Vincente de Valera y Álvarez; September 26, 1822; San Cristóbal, Dominican Republic
- Died: January 16, 1899 (aged 76); Barcelona, Spain
- Military career
- Allegiance: Spain
- Branch: Spanish Army
- Rank: Lieutenant-General
- Commands: Las Tunas
- Conflicts: Dominican Restoration War; Ten Years' War; First Battle of Las Tunas

José de Valera (September 26, 1822 – January 16, 1899) was a high-ranking Spanish military figure who distinguished himself in Cuba's Ten Years' War.

== Early life ==
José Vincente de Valera y Álvarez, born in 1822 in San Cristóbal, Dominican Republic, was described as a Dominican "mulatto". His lineage traces back to Juan de Valera Saldaña, former Captain of the Royal Spanish Army during the 17th century.

He was the godfather of Cuban General Máximo Gómez, who had previously been a cavalry officer in the Spanish Army in Santo Domingo before joining the Cuban independence movement.

== Dominican Restoration War ==
During the Dominican Restoration War between 1863 and 1865, Lieutenant Colonel José de Valera served under the corps of Lieutenant Colonel Chief of Staff Valeriano Weyler in the Spanish Army. He was the First Chief of the 2nd Battalion of Cuba. Spanish troops evacuated from the Dominican Republic in the summer of 1865 and arrived in Cuba following the Santo Domingo campaign.

== Ten Years' War ==
He served as a colonel under Captain General Arsenio Martínez Campos during Cuba's Ten Years' War that began in 1868.

=== Battle of Las Tunas ===
Valera took part in the first Battle of Las Tunas on August 16, 1869, against revolutionary forces led by Gen. Manuel de Quesada. Col. Valera saw a sizable group of Cubans advancing toward Las Tunas after leading a reconnaissance of mounted cavalry sent by Gen. Enrique Boniche. Following the battle, the Cuban Liberation Army took control of the area before retreating when reports of 1000 Spanish reinforcements surfaced.

On January 1, 1870, the departure of Col. Velasco left Col. Valera in Las Tunas to act as military commander of the town. Valera was the Colonel of the reserves of Santo Domingo, in Sagua la Grande and assumed position as governor of Las Tunas.

In the same year, Col. Valera led 1000 Spanish troops in a skirmish with 400 of Antonio Maceo's men near Monte Oscuro in Santa Clara. After putting up a fight against the combined forces of Valera and Arsenio Martínez Campos, Maceo's brigade was forced to retreat due to a lack of arms and ammunition.

On December 27, 1870, 600 troops led by Col. Valera drove away nearly 500 insurgents after an engagement in which 35 Spaniards and roughly the same number of insurgents were killed or wounded.

In June 1872, Valera's troops engaged 56 Mambí fighters under the command of Gen. Julio Grave de Peralta. A failed expedition led Grave de Peralta and his Cuban insurgents near a jurisdiction under Valera's command. His Spanish troops killed Grave de Peralta, captured some of the mambíses, and seized their vessel's entire cargo. With 136 weapons, 200 boxes of ammunition, 2 pieces of artillery, and a captured flag, he arrived at Santiago de Cuba.

In 1874, Valera's rank was upgraded to brigadier-general.

In September 1879, the Spanish government established a new military jurisdiction that included the cities of Holguín, Las Tunas, and Gibara due to their distance from Santiago de Cuba. José de Valera was named military governor of the new territory.

On November 5, 1879, Gen. Valera attacked an insurgent party but was defeated with 250 of his men killed and injured. He fled to Holguín before being reinforced by Gen. Ramón Blanco, 1st Marquess of Peña Plata.

Gen. Blanco formed a council in Havana with Admiral Dámaso Berenguer and Generals Valera and Camilo García de Polavieja to prepare troops and volunteers that suppressed an uprising of Afro-Cubans in December 1880.

== Retirement ==
Prior to his return to Spain, he resided in Gibara, where he owned large estates. Retired Lieutenant-General José Valera, then around seventy years old, returned to Spain on the Reina Maria Christina in August 1898.

== Death ==
José Vincente de Valera died on January 16, 1899, in Barcelona, Spain.

== See also ==
- De Valera, surname
