= Virginius Affair =

Dispute among the United States, the United Kingdom, and Spain

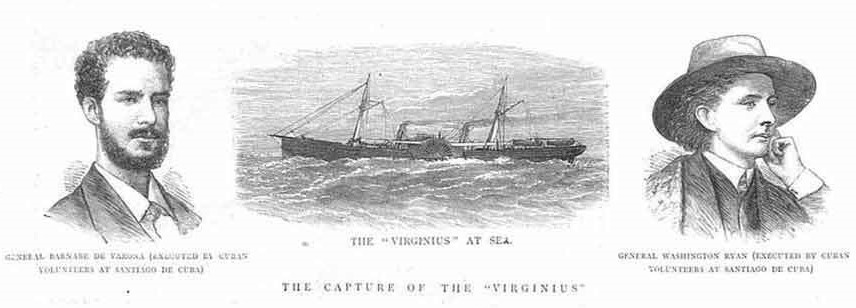
- The "Virginius", with portraits of General Bernabé Varona and General William A.C. Ryan, executed by the Spanish Governor at Santiago de Cuba. The Graphic, 1873.
- Date: October 30 – November 8, 1873
- Location: Santiago de Cuba
- Participants: United States; United Kingdom; Spain
- Outcome: Peace negotiation
- Deaths: 53

The Virginius Affair was a diplomatic dispute that played out between October 1873 and February 1875 between the United States, Great Britain, and Spain. Virginius was a fast American ship that had been hired by Cuban insurrectionists to land men and munitions in Cuba during the Ten Years' War, the first of three late-19th century uprisings against Spanish rule in Cuba. The ship was captured by the Spanish, who wanted to try the men onboard (many of whom were American and British citizens) as pirates and execute them. The Spanish executed 53 men in Santiago de Cuba, but stopped when the British government intervened.

Through the first month of the affair there was agitation for war in both the United States and Spain, but as more was learned tensions faded on both sides, and the threat of war had largely evaporated by the end of December. However, it took more than a year after that for the final details to be settled, largely because of the ineffectiveness of the original American envoy to Spain, Daniel Sickles, and two turnovers of the Spanish government. In the end the Spanish government compensated British families for the deaths of British citizens, and subsequently newly appointed US consul Caleb Cushing ended the episode by negotiating for reparations to be paid to the families of the remainder of the executed men, American or otherwise. The settlement of the issue through diplomacy represented a major achievement for US Secretary of State Hamilton Fish.

== Ten Years' War ==
After the American Civil War, the island country of Cuba under Spanish rule was one of the few Western Hemisphere countries where slavery remained legal and was widely practiced. On October 10, 1868, an uprising by Cuban landowners that became known as the Ten Years' War began, with Carlos Manuel de Céspedes claiming the title of President of Cuba in Arms.. The Spanish, led initially by the Captain-General of Cuba, Francisco de Lersundi y Hormaechea, used the military to try to suppress the rebellion. In 1870, American Secretary of State Hamilton Fish persuaded President Grant not to recognize Cuban belligerency, and the United States maintained an unstable peace with Spain.

As the Cuban war continued, international support for the insurgency began to arise, with war bonds being sold in the US to support the rebellion. One of the Cubans' American supporters was John F. Patterson, who, in 1870, bought a former Confederate blockade runner, the Virgin, that was laid up at the Washington Navy Yard, and renamed her Virginius. The legality of Patterson's purchase of Virginius would later come to national and international attention. The Cuban rebellion ended in an 1878 armistice after Spanish general Arsenio Martínez-Campos pardoned all Cuban rebels.

== Virginius ==
Virginius was a small, high-speed side-wheel steamer built to serve as a blockade runner, operating between Havana and Mobile, Alabama, for the Confederacy during the Civil War. Originally built as Virgin by Aitken & Mansel of Whiteinch, Glasgow in 1864, she became a prize of the United States when captured on April 12, 1865. In August 1870, Virginius was purchased by an American, John F. Patterson, acting secretly as an agent for Cuban insurgent Manuel de Quesada and two US citizens, Marshall O. Roberts and J.K. Roberts. The ship was originally captained by Francis Sheppherd. Both Patterson and Shepphard immediately registered the ship in the New York Custom House, having paid $2,000 to be bonded. However, no sureties were listed. Patterson took a required oath attesting that he was the sole owner of Virginius. The secret purpose of purchasing Virginius was to transport men, munitions, and supplies to aid the Cuban rebellion. She operated in this role for three years under the protection of US naval ships, including USS Kansas and USS Canandaigua. The Spanish said that it was an outlaw ship and aggressively sought to capture it.

== Capture, trial, and executions ==
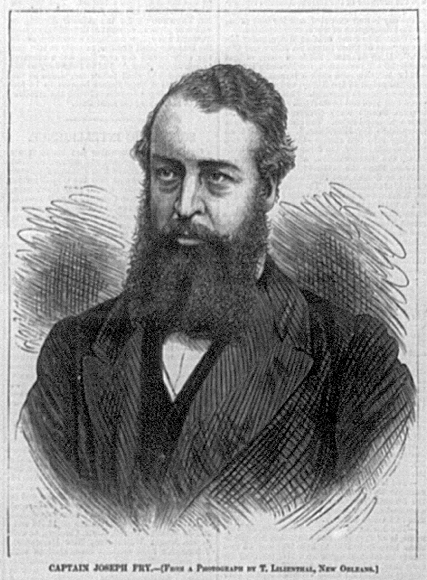
Joseph Fry, captain of Virginius, whom Spain executed for bringing arms to Cuban rebels

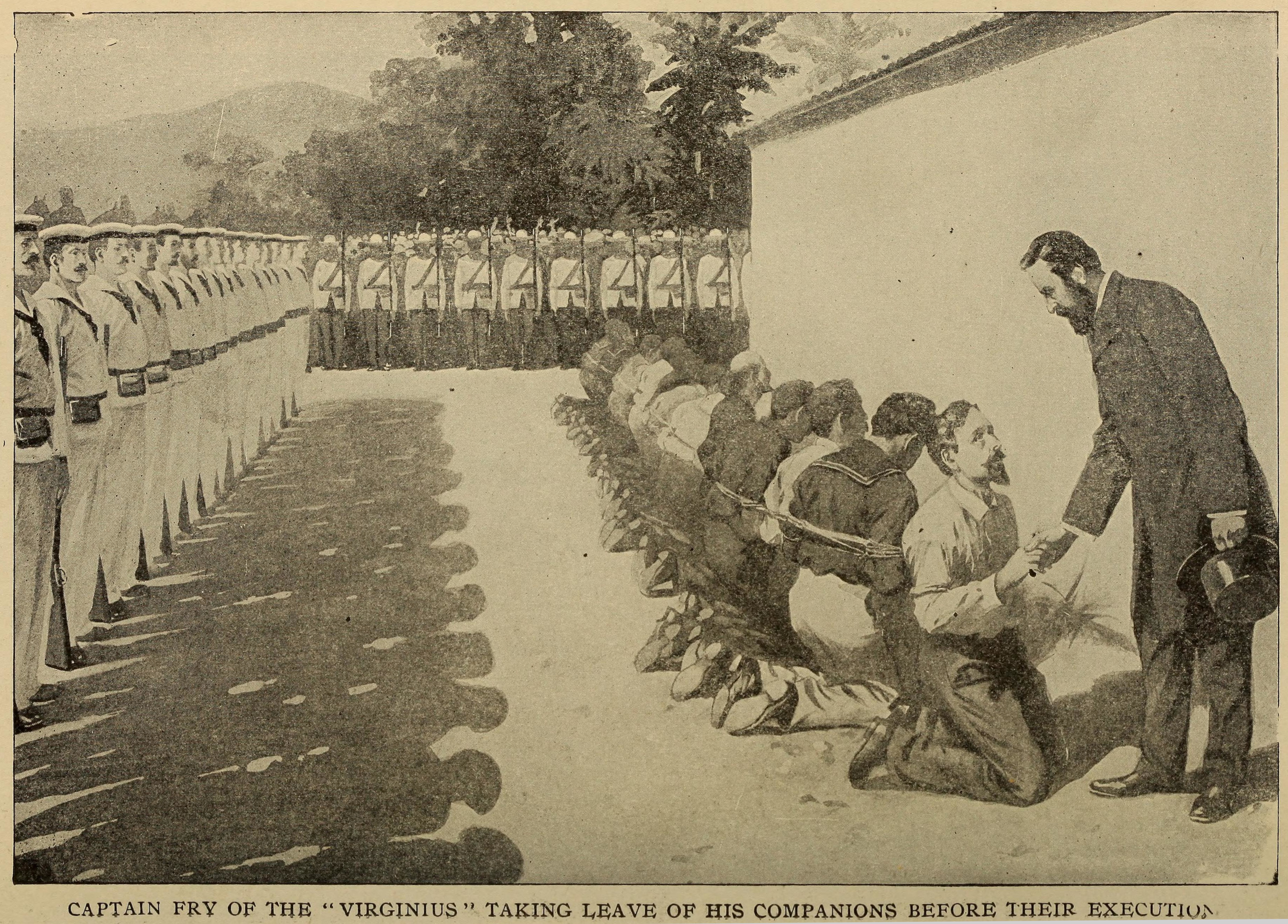
Captain Fry takes leave of his companions

Captain Joseph Fry was made the new captain of Virginius in October 1873. Fry had served in the US Navy for 15 years before joining the Confederacy during the Civil War. Fry rose to the rank of Commodore in the Confederate Navy. With the war's end in 1865, Fry found himself underemployed. He took charge of Virginius while she was moored at Kingston, Jamaica. By this time she was badly in need of repair, with boilers that were breaking down. As most of the previous crew had deserted, Fry recruited a new crew of 52 American and British men, many of them inexperienced (three being under 13 years of age) and not aware that Virginius was supporting the Cuban rebellion. The ship took on 103 native Cuban soldiers who had arrived on a steamer from New York. The US Consul at Kingston, Thomas H. Pearne, had warned Fry that he would be shot if captured. However, Fry did not believe the Spanish would shoot a blockade runner. In mid-October, Captain Fry, accompanied by his four most prominent passengers, Pedro de Céspedes (brother of Carlos Manuel de Céspedes), Bernabé Varona, Jesús del Sol, and William A.C. Ryan, took Virginius to Haiti and loaded the ship with munitions. On October 30, Virginius sailed to Comito to pick up more weapons and then, on the same day, started toward Cuba. The Spanish had been warned when Virginius left Jamaica and sent out the warship Tornado to capture the vessel.

On October 30, 1873 Tornado spotted Virginius on open water 6 miles (9.7 km) from Cuba and gave chase. Virginius was heavily weighted, and the stress from the boilers caused the ship to take on water, significantly slowing any progress. As the chase continued, Tornado, a fast warship, fired on Virginius several times, damaging the top deck. Captain Fry surrendered Virginius, knowing that, with his ship's overworked boilers and leaking hull, he could not outrun Tornado on the open sea. The Spanish quickly boarded and secured the ship, taking the crew and its passengers prisoner and sailing the ship to Santiago de Cuba.

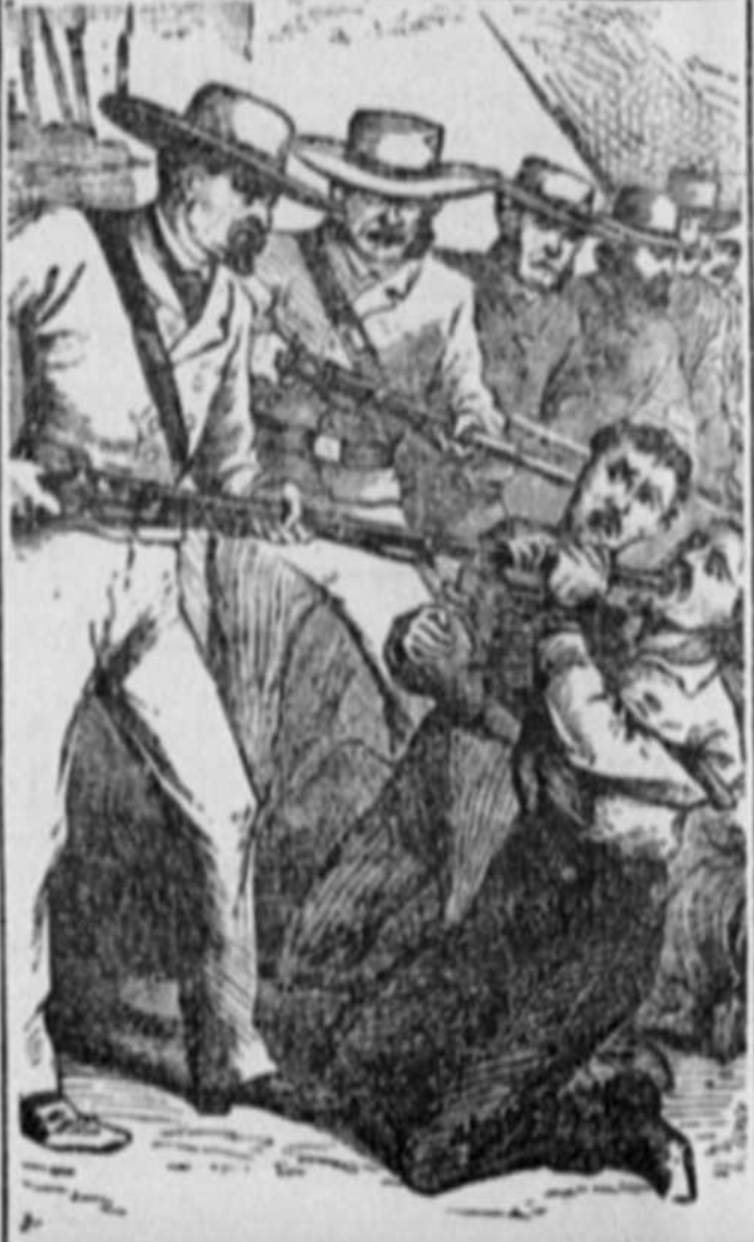
Depiction of the execution

The Spanish immediately ordered all aboard to be put on trial as pirates. The entire Virginius crew, both American and British citizens, as well as the Cuban insurgents, were found guilty by a court martial and were sentenced to death. The Spanish ignored the protest of the US vice-consul, who attempted to give American citizens legal aid. On November 4, 1873, the four insurgent leaders aboard were executed by firing squad without trial, having already been condemned as a pirates. After the executions, the British vice-consul at Santiago, concerned by the fact that one of the individuals killed, George Washington Ryan, claimed British citizenship, wired Jamaica to ask for aid from the Royal Navy to stop further executions. Hearing news of the ship's capture and the executions, Altamont de Cordova, a Jamaican resident, was able to get British Commodore A.F.R. de Horsey to send the sloop HMS Niobe under Sir Lambton Loraine, 11th Baronet to Santiago to stop further executions. On November 7, an additional 37 men, including Captain Fry, were executed by firing squad. The executioners' aim was said to have been bad, so they finished the job in a grisly fashion, decapitating them and trampling their bodies with horses. On November 8, twelve more crew members were executed; but at this point the USS Wyoming, under the command of Civil War Naval hero William Cushing, and HMS Niobe both reached Santiago. The carnage stopped on the same day, as Cushing (and possibly the British Captain Lorraine) warned local commander Juan N. Burriel that he would bombard Santiago if there were any more executions, leaving the final death toll at 53. In an interview that Burriel requested with Sir Lambton Lorraine, he attempted to shake hands with the English captain, who stood straight and exclaimed, "I will not shake hands with a butcher".

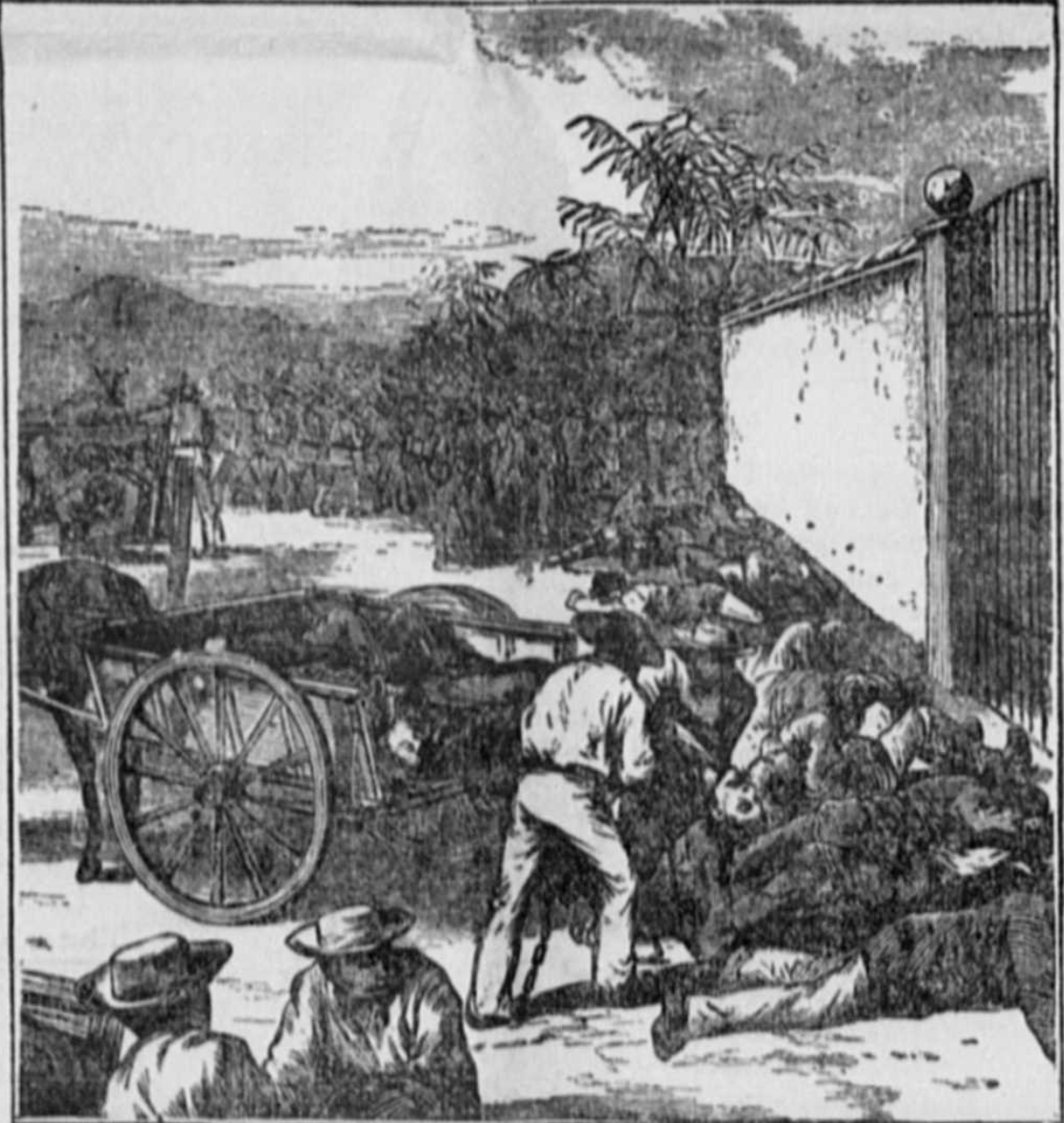
African Chain-gang moving the bodies to the mule carts

== US public reaction ==
The initial press reaction to the capture of Virginius was muted, but as news of executions poured into the nation, certain newspapers became aggressive in promoting war, or at least formal recognition of Cuban belligerency. The New York Times opined that if the executions of Americans from Virginius were illegal, war needed to be declared. The New York Tribune asserted that actions of Burriel and the Cuban Volunteers necessitated "the death knell of Spanish power in America." The New York Herald demanded Secretary Hamilton Fish's resignation and the recognition by the US of Cuban belligerency. The National Republican, believing that war with Spain was imminent, encouraged the sale of Cuban bonds. The American public considered the executions to be a national insult and rallied for intervention. Protest rallies took place across the nation in New Orleans, St. Louis, and Georgia, encouraging intervention in Cuba and vengeance against Spain.

The British Minister to the United States, Sir Edward Thornton, believed the American public was ready for war with Spain. A large rally in New York's Steinway Hall on November 17, 1873, led by future Secretary of State William Evarts, took a moderate position, and the meeting adopted a resolution that war would be necessary, yet regrettable, if Spain chose to "consider our defense against savage butchery as a cause of war...."

== US diplomatic response ==
=== Hamilton Fish and State Department ===
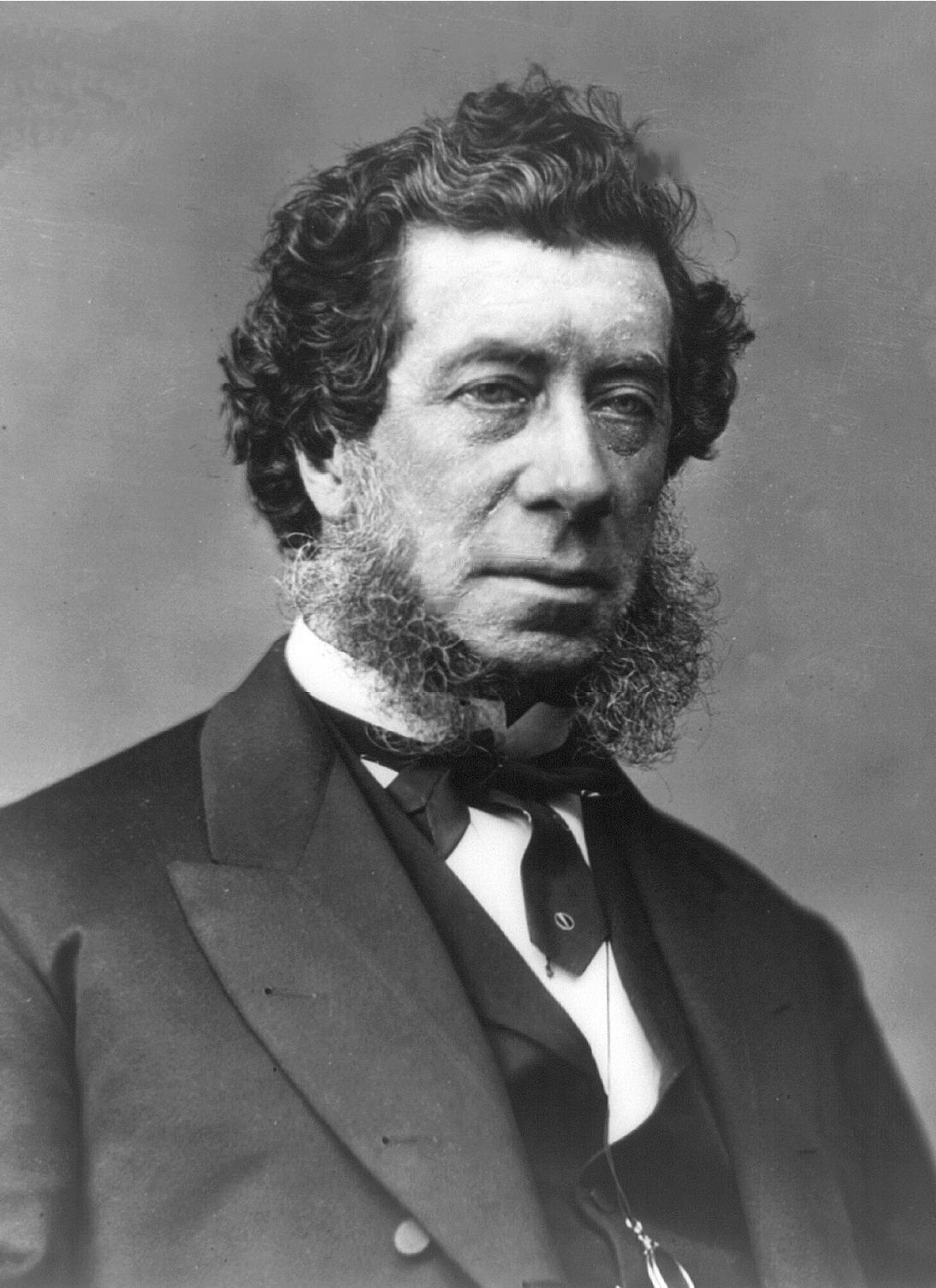
Hamilton Fish, US Secretary of State

On Wednesday, November 5, 1873, the US Consul-General in Havana, Henry C. Hall, informed the US State Department that Virginius had been captured. Secretary of State Hamilton Fish believed the Virginius was just another ship captured aiding the Cuban rebellion; no one in the American administration was yet aware of the first four executions However, with Cuba heading the agenda of the November 7 meeting of the American cabinet, news came in during the meeting of the deaths of Ryan and the three Cubans. The Cabinet agreed that the executions would be "regarded as an inhuman act not in accordance with the spirit of the civilization of the nineteenth century." On November 8, Fish met with Spanish minister Don José Polo de Bernabé and discussed the legality of the capture of Virginius.

On November 11, Grant's Cabinet decided that war with Spain was not desirable, but intervention in the rebellion on the side of Cuba remained possible. On November 12, five days after the event, Fish received the devastating news that 37 additional men had been executed. Fish ordered US Minister to Spain Daniel Sickles to protest the executions and demand reparations for any persons considered US citizens who were killed. On November 13, Fish formally protested to Polo and stated that the US had a free hand on Cuba because of the Virginius Affair. On November 14, Grant's cabinet agreed that if US reparation demands were not met, the Spanish legation would be closed. That day a report came into the White House that more crew members had been shot, but it turned out that "only" twelve additional people had been executed. On November 15, Polo visited Fish and stated that Virginius was a pirate ship and that her crew had been a hostile threat to Cuba. Fish, although doubtful that the ship really represented US territory because of questions about its ownership, was determined to stand up for the nation's honor by demanding reparations from Spain.

On the same day, a cable was sent to Sickles by Fish, ordering the envoy to demand the return of Virginius to the US, the release of all survivors into American custody, a salute from Spain to the US flag, punishment for the perpetrators, and reparations for families.

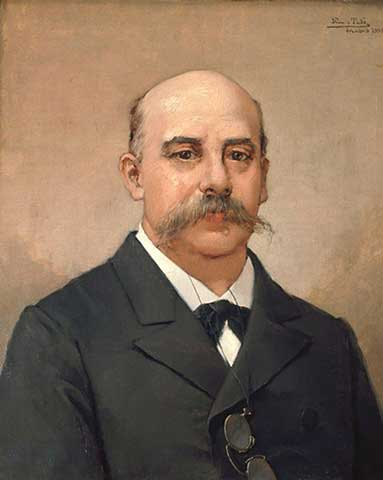
Emilio Castelar, President of Spain

Negotiations in Spain between Sickles and Minister of State José de Carvajal became heated, and progress towards a settlement became unlikely. The Spanish press, as belligerent as its American counterparts, openly attacked Sickles, the US, and Britain, hoping to precipitate war between the three countries. While the Sickles-Carvajal negotiations were breaking down, President Emilio Castelar decided to bypass this channel and allow Fish and Polo, in Washington, to take the lead in settling the dispute. On Thanksgiving Day, November 27, Polo proposed to Fish that Spain would give up the Virginius and the remaining crew if the US would investigate the legal status of its ownership. Both Fish and Grant agreed to Polo's suggestion, and that the Spanish salute to the US flag could be dispensed with if Virginius was found not to have legal US private citizen ownership. On November 28, Polo and Fish met at the State Department and signed a formal agreement that required the return of Virginius and crew, an investigation by both governments of the legal ownership of Virginius, and any crimes committed by the Spanish Volunteers.

The threat of war between the two countries had been averted through negotiations, but the time and place of the surrender of the Virginius and the remaining crew remained undetermined for several days. On December 5, Fish and Polo signed an agreement that Virginius, with the US flag flying, would be turned over to the US Navy on December 16 at the port of Bahía Honda. Sickles, having lost the confidence of Grant and Fish, resigned on December 20, 1873. On January 6, 1874, after advice from Fish on a replacement for Sickles, Grant appointed eminent attorney and Spanish scholar Caleb Cushing as Minister to Spain.

=== Virginius and crew returned ===
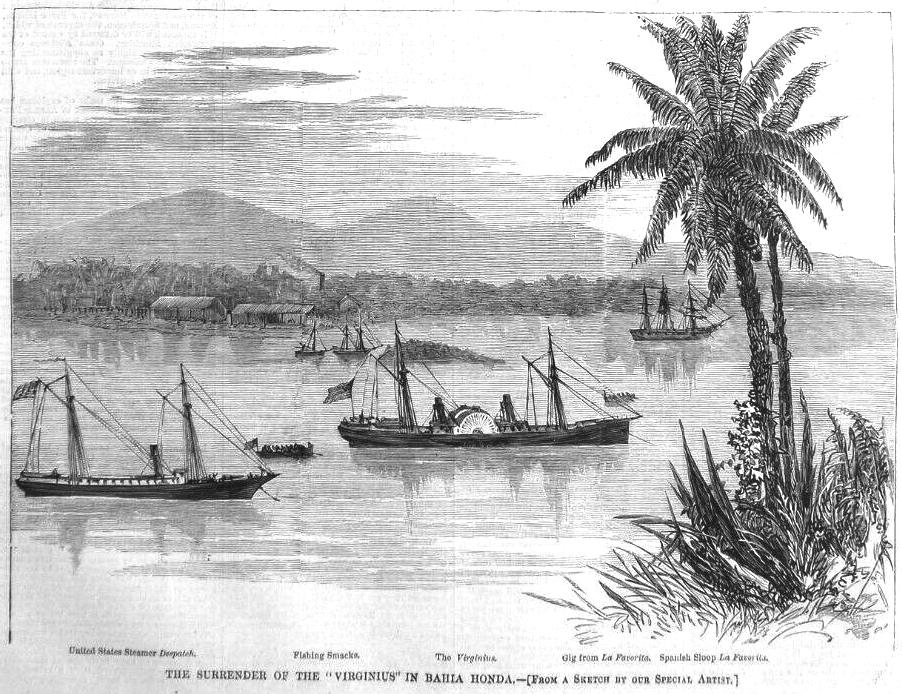
The Surrender of the Virginius in Bahia Honda

On December 16, Virginius, now in complete disrepair and taking on water, was towed out to open sea with the US flag flying to be turned over to the US Navy. US Captain W.D. Whiting on board USS Despatch agreed with Spanish Commander Manuel de la Cámara to turn over Virginius the following day. On December 17, at exactly 9:00 a.m., Virginius was formally turned over to the US Navy without incident. The same day, after an investigation, US Attorney General George H. Williams ruled that the US ownership of Virginius had been fraudulent and that she had no right to fly the US flag; however, Spain had no right to capture Virginius and her crew on the open sea.

At 4:17 a.m., on December 26, while under tow by USS Ossipee, Virginius foundered off Cape Fear en route to the United States. Her 91 remaining crewmen, who had been held as prisoners under harsh conditions, were handed over to Captain D.L. Braine of Juanita and were taken safely to New York City.

=== Reparations awarded ===
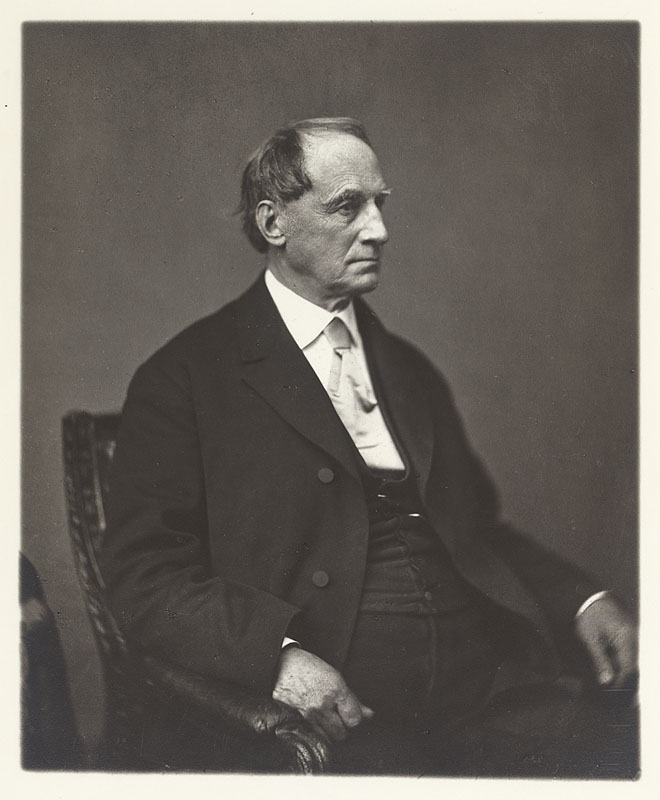
Caleb Cushing, U.S. Consul to Spain

On January 3, 1874, Spanish President Emilio Castelar was voted out of office and replaced by Francisco Serrano. Cushing, who had replaced Sickles as US Consul to Spain, stated that the US had been fortunate that Castelar, a university scholar, had been President of Spain, given that his replacement, Serrano, might have been more apt to go to war over the affair. Cushing's primary duty was to get Spanish reparations for Virginius family victims and punishment of Burriel for the 53 Santiago executions. Cushing met with Serrano in May on June 26, and on July 5 he wrote to Fish that Spain was ready to make reparations. In October, Cushing was informed that President Castelar had secretly negotiated reparations between Spain and Britain that totaled £7,700, but black British citizen families were given less money. On November 7, Grant and Fish demanded $2,500 from Spain for each US citizen shot, regardless of race. On November 28, 1874, Fish instructed Cushing that all Virginius crew members not considered British would, for the purpose of reparations, be considered American.

Spanish Consul Antonio Mantilla, Polo's replacement, agreed with the reparations. Grant's 1875 State of the Union Address announced that reparations were near, quieting anger over the Virginius affair. Payment of reparations, however, was put on hold as Spain changed governments on December 28, from a republic back to a monarchy. Alfonso XII became King of Spain on January 11, 1875.

On January 16, Cushing met with the new Spanish state minister Castro, urged settlement before the US Congress adjourned, and noted that reparations would be a minor matter compared to an all-out war between Spain and the US.

Under an agreement of February 7, 1875, signed on March 5, the Spanish government paid the US an indemnity of $80,000 for the execution of the Americans. Burriel's Santiago executions were acknowledged as illegal by Spain, and President Serrano and King Alfonso condemned him. The case against Burriel was taken up by the Spanish Tribunal of the Navy in June 1876. However, Burriel died on December 24, 1877, before any trial could occur.

In addition to the reparations, a private indemnity was given to Captain Fry's financially troubled family in St. Louis, who had been unable to pay rent and had no permanent place to live.

== Aftermath ==
When the Virginius affair first broke out, a Spanish ironclad—the Arapiles—happened to be anchored in New York Harbor for repairs, leading to the uncomfortable realization on the part of the US Navy that it had no ship capable of defeating such a vessel. The weakness of the US Navy was further emphasized by the scandalously poor showing of an American fleet that had been assembled in response to the crisis during maneuvers conducted in Florida waters in February and March of 1874, after the worst of the crisis had passed. US Secretary of the Navy George M. Robeson had, since coming into office in 1869, pushed for the construction of at least some up-to-date ships, but had been rebuffed by Congress, and even now, in the wake of the Virginius crisis, monies for new construction were denied. Robeson therefore took it upon himself to order the construction of five new twin-turreted monitors without Congressional approval, paying for them, at first, using money allocated for the refurbishing of numerous ships, and disguising this act by turning five deteriorating Civil War-era monitors--USS Puritan, and four ships of the Miantonomoh class--over to the builders. The new ships were given the same names as the old ones, but were represented to Congress and the public as actually being the old vessels, thoroughly overhauled. As supplemental payment the shipbuilders were allowed to scrap the five old vessels and keep the proceeds from the sale of the scrap metal; later dozens of additional ships that had been deemed beyond repair were also turned over to the shipbuilders for scrapping, as further payment. This duplicitous effort to strengthen the navy did not, in the end, pay off: after Robeson left office in 1877 his successor, upon learning about what Robeson had done, halted construction of the new ships. They were, ultimately, completed, but not until the 1890s, by which time they were thoroughly obsolete. The Virginius war scare had not led to any sort of naval resurgence--no such resurgence would occur for another decade--but the five new ironclads would be completed in time to take part in the Spanish–American War of 1898.

== Sources ==
- Bradford, Richard H. (1980). The Virginius Affair. Boulder: Colorado Associate University Press. ISBN 0870810804.
- Soodalter, Ron (2009). "To The Brink In Cuba 1873". Military History. 26 (4): 62–67.
- Swann, Leonard Alexander (1965). John Roach, Maritime Entrepreneur: the Years as Naval Contractor, 1862–1886. — U.S. Naval Institute. (reprinted: 1980. Ayer Publishing). ISBN 9780405130786.
