= Bernabé Varona =

Cuban army general (1845-1873)

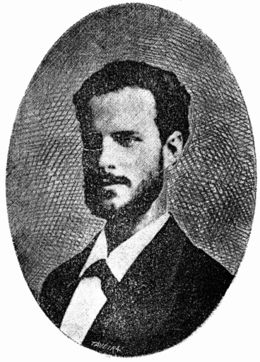
- Born: Bernabé Varona y Borrero; 1845; Puerto Príncipe, Captaincy General of Cuba, Spanish Empire
- Died: November 4, 1873; Santiago de Cuba, Captaincy General of Cuba, Spanish Empire
- Burial place: Santa Ifigenia Cemetery
- Military career
- Allegiance: Cuba
- Branch: Cuban Liberation Army
- Rank: Generalissimo
- Conflicts: Ten Years' War; Battle of Bonilla; Battle of Las Teguas; First Battle of Las Tunas; Virginius Affair

Bernabé Varona (1845 – November 4, 1873), also known as Bembetta, was a Cuban revolutionary and mambí General who was executed during the Ten Years' War in 1873.

== Early life ==
Bernabé Varona y Borrero was born in the district of Puerto Príncipe (now Camagüey) in Spanish Cuba in 1845. He was the son of Bernabé Varona and María Borrero y Duque de Estrada. His father was a prominent Cuban citizen and wealthy sugar planter in Puerto Príncipe.

Sent by his patriotic mother, he received his college education in the United States. After completing his education, he returned to Cuba and began his years-long opposition to Spanish rule.

Varona became a member of the Tínima Masonic Lodge No. 16 in Puerto Príncipe, along with other prominent figures of the region's society.

In 1868, Varona was taken prisoner and sent to Havana where he was reported to the captain-general Domingo Dulce as one of the most desperate and dangerous men then opposed to the Spanish government.

== Ten Years' War ==
He first returned to the U.S. before returning to Cuba, where he faced intense surveillance in Nuevitas. When Carlos Manuel de Céspedes issued the Cry of Yara in October 1868, resulting in the Ten Years' War, Bernabé Varona was one of the first to join the liberating ranks. He managed to leave town to join the uprising in Yara.

Varona was actively involved in multiple encounters with Spanish troops. Operating out of Camagüey, he acquired a general command that extended across the district and additional areas.

=== Battle of Bonilla ===
During the Battle of Bonilla in Las Minas in November 1868, Spanish troops led by Blas Villate were defeated by forces commanded by Varona and Ángel del Castillo, leading to their retreat to San Miguel de Nuevitas. He routed another force in the Battle of Las Yeguas.

By 1869, Varona was a Brigade major in the Cuban Liberation Army under Gen. Manuel de Quesada. In April 1869, he was assigned to head the personal escort of the General-in-Chief, leading 300 cavalrymen.

=== Battle of Las Tunas ===
Leading the personal escort of Manuel de Quesada, Gen. Bernabé Varona fought in the first Battle of Las Tunas on August 16, 1869.

=== The Virginius Affair ===
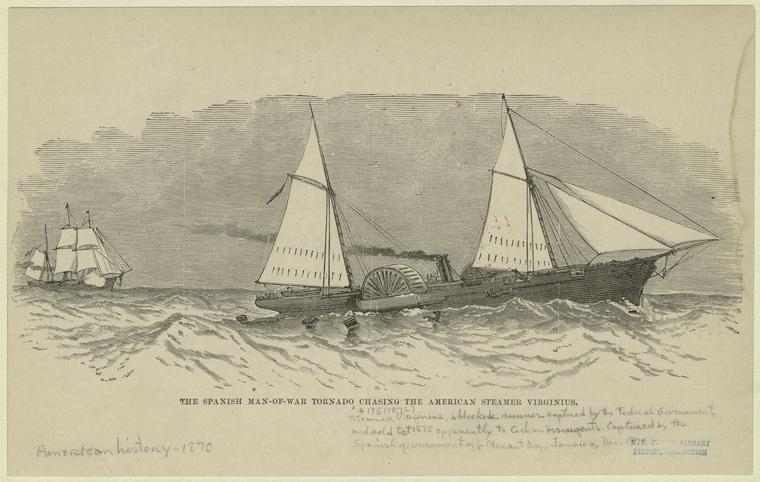
The Spanish Man-of-War Tornado Chasing the American Steamer Virginius

Gen. Bernabé Varona was the chief of the filibustering Virginius expedition, that occurred during the Ten Years' War. The Virginius and crew including Captain Joseph Fry were captured by the Spanish corvette Tornado on October 31, 1873. Before the vessel was seized, Varona advised blowing up the vessel with all on board rather than falling into the hands of the Spanish government. All on board were made prisoners and taken to the port of Santiago de Cuba. Upon Varona's arrival, fifteen Spanish army officers, who had been taken prisoner by Varona on the battlefield, went to the Governor of Santiago to request that his life be spared since he had spared theirs. On November 2, 1873, he was tried as a pirate and sentenced to death by the Council of war at Santiago.

== Death ==
On November 4, 1873, Gen. Varona was executed by firing squad in Santiago de Cuba, along with the 3 other insurrection leaders, Jesús del Sol, Pedro de Céspedes, and William A.C. Ryan. After refusing to kneel, he was murdered alongside W.A.C. Ryan while standing firm in their resistance. Varona was 28 years old at the time of his death. His burial took place in the Santa Ifigenia Cemetery.

His brother Col. Oscar Varona met the same fate on November 8 for his involvement in the failed expedition.
