= William A.C. Ryan =

Canadian-born Cuban army colonel (1843–1873)

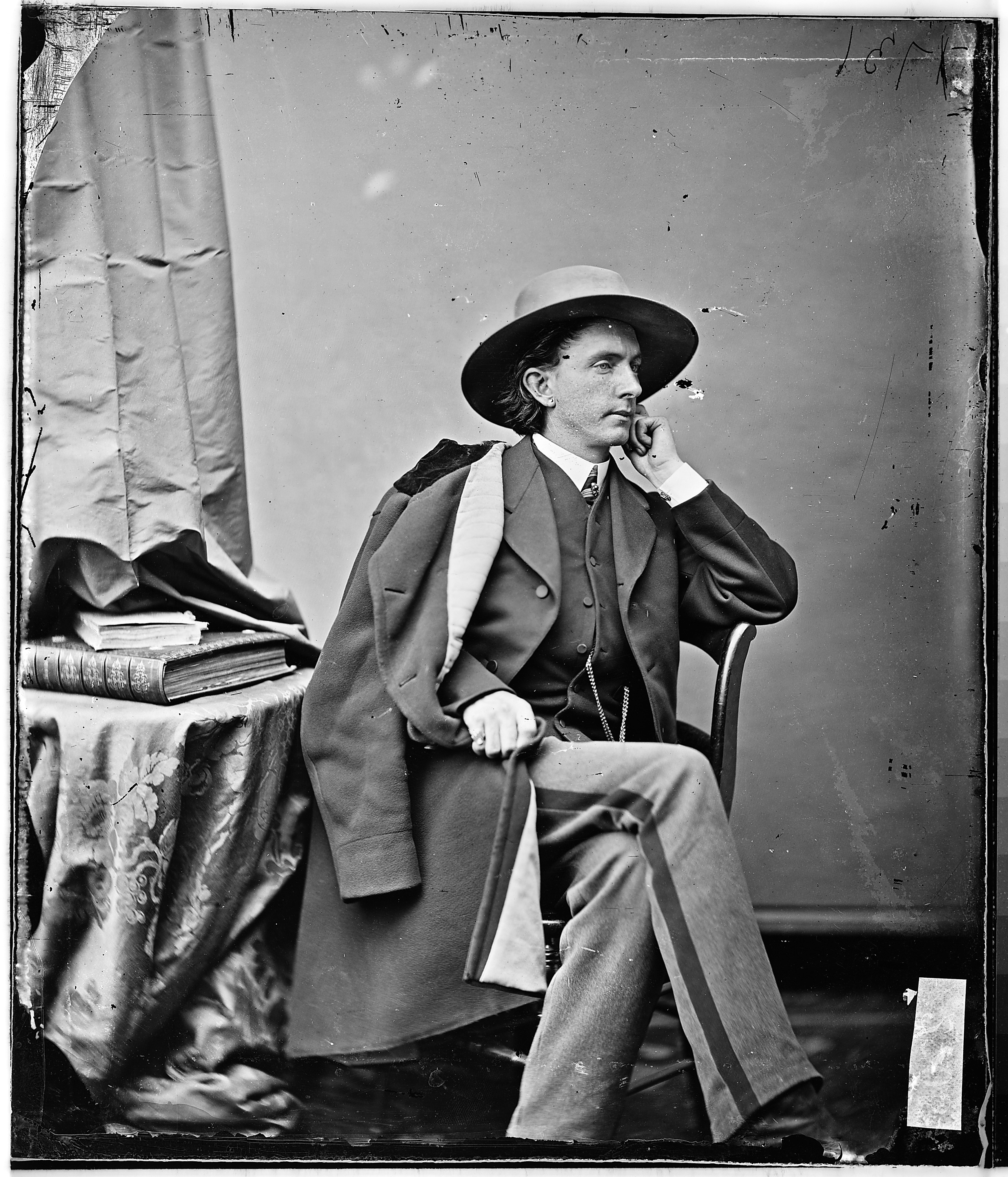
- Born: William Albert Charles Ryan; March 28, 1843; Toronto, Canada
- Died: November 4, 1873 (aged 30); Santiago de Cuba, Captaincy General of Cuba, Spanish Empire
- Military career
- Allegiance: United States; Cuba
- Branch: Union Army; Cuban Liberation Army
- Rank: Brigadier General
- Unit: 132nd New York Infantry
- Conflicts: American Civil War; Battle of New Bern (1864); Ten Years' War; Virginius Affair

William A.C. Ryan (March 28, 1843 – November 4, 1873), also known as William Albert Charles Ryan, was a Canadian-born Civil War veteran and mambí colonel who was executed in the Virginius Affair during the Ten Years' War.

== Early life ==
William Albert Charles Ryan was born in Toronto, Canada on March 28, 1843.

His family immigrated to the United States when he was a small child where he was educated in Buffalo, New York.

== American Civil War ==
W.A.C Ryan entered the Union Army at the onset of the American Civil War as a member of the New York Volunteers, serving in the 132nd Infantry Regiment and later achieving the rank of captain. From June 24, 1863, to October 29, 1864, he served as second lieutenant. During the Battle of New Bern, Ryan was wounded by a Minié ball at Bachelor's Creek, North Carolina on February 1, 1864. It fractured his last lumbar vertebrae and became stuck in the sacrum. He was sent to the Foster General Hospital in New Berne. On October 29, 1864, the lieutenant was dismissed from service. Shortly after, Ryan authored articles for New York newspapers that included false statements and a disparaging message directed at the surgeon overseeing Foster General Hospital, where he was receiving treatment. In 1865, a court-martial charged him with disobedience of orders, actions detrimental to military discipline, and unbecoming conduct for an officer and gentleman. Upon conviction, he received a dishonorable discharge, forfeiture of all pay and benefits, and a permanent ban from commissioning in the U.S. Army or volunteer forces.

== Ten Years' War ==
He joined the fight for Cuba's freedom in the first independence war, the Ten Years' War.

William A.C. Ryan, in 1869, worked for the Cuban Junta in New York, focusing on acquiring military supplies and coordinating expeditions for the insurrection. On April 16, 1869, the Federal Grand Jury of United States District Court for the Southern District of New York indicted William A.C. Ryan, José Morales Lemus, and others for violating the Neutrality Act of 1818, related to their military campaign against Cuba that started on May 1, 1869. Arrest warrants were issued for the individuals, and Ryan was apprehended shortly thereafter, being held in the Ludlow Street Jail before his release on bail.

He soon joined the mambises under Ignacio Agramonte in the Camagüey district of Cuba. When Thomas Jordan was appointed as chief of staff of the Cuban Liberation Army, W.A.C Ryan was promoted to inspector general. By April 1870, he was a colonel in the Cuban Liberation Army.

He continued to assist with planning naval expeditions during the early 1870s.

=== The Fannie Expedition ===
On June 6, 1872, a failed expedition led by General Julio Grave de Peralta and Colonel William A.C. Ryan embarked from New York aboard the filibustering steamer known as the "Fannie."

=== The Virginius Expedition ===
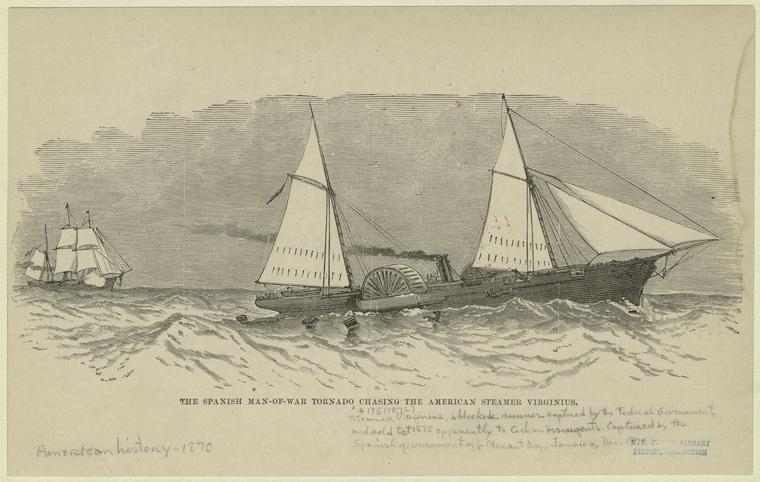
The Spanish Man-of-War Tornado Chasing the American Steamer Virginius

He was one of the insurgent leaders on the ill-fated Virginius, a ship commanded by Joseph Fry under the direction of Mambí General Bernabé Varona. On October 31, 1873, William A.C. Ryan was taken prisoner by the Spanish corvette Tornado. He was tried as a pirate and sentenced to death by the Council of war at Santiago.

== Death ==
On November 4, 1873, General W.A.C. Ryan was executed by firing squad in Santiago de Cuba, along with Jesús del Sol, Pedro de Céspedes, and Bernabé Varona. He was killed standing next to Varona after they refused to kneel and continued to resist. When W.A.C. Ryan was not slain immediately, a Spanish officer came up and drove his sword into the heart of the Canadian mambí. He was buried in the Santa Ifigenia Cemetery.

Following his death, Life and Adventures of Gen. Ryan, the Cuban Martyr was written by his older brother John George Ryan and published in 1876.

On account of the executions that were carried out, Madrid paid an indemnity of $80,000 on February 27, 1875. A joint resolution approved in 1882 allowed William Ryan's mother Eliza Dunne to receive a part of the indemnity funds from the Government of Spain.
