= First Battle of Donaldsonville =

Battle of the American Civil War

Coordinates: 30.10°N 90.99°W

- Part of the American Civil War
Date	August 9, 1862
Location	Ascension Parish, Louisiana
Result	Union victory

Belligerents
United States (Union)	(Confederate States of America) CSA (Confederacy)

Commanders and leaders
David G. Farragut	Phillippe Landry

Strength
3 ships	

Casualties and losses
0	0

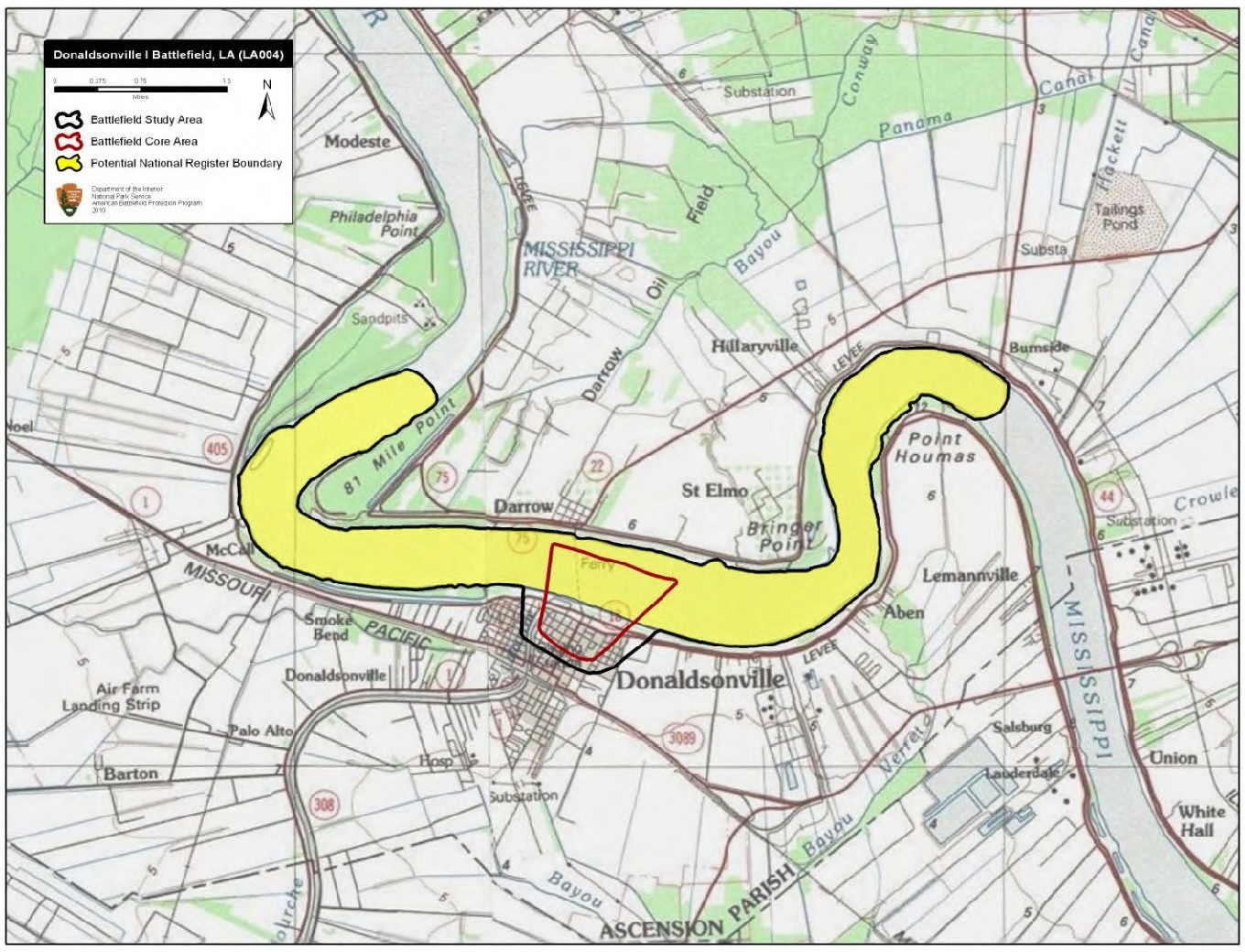
Map of Donaldsonville I Battlefield core and study areas by the American Battlefield Protection Program.

The First Battle of Donaldsonville took place on August 9, 1862, in Ascension Parish, Louisiana, as part of the Operations against Baton Rouge in the American Civil War.

A number of incidents of artillery firing on Union steamers passing up and down the Mississippi River at Donaldsonville, Louisiana, influenced the U.S. Navy to undertake a retaliatory attack. Rear Adm. David G. Farragut sent the town notice of his intentions and suggested that the citizens send the women and children away. He then anchored in front of the town and fired upon it with guns and mortars. Farragut also sent a detachment ashore that set fire to the hotels, wharf buildings, and the dwelling houses and other buildings of Capt. Phillippe Landry. Landry, thought to be the captain of the partisan unit, purportedly fired on the landing party during the raid. Some citizens protested the raid, but, generally, firing on Union ships ceased thereafter.

== See also ==
- Second Battle of Donaldsonville
