= List of mayors of Havana =

This is a list of the mayors of Havana. Prior to 1550, each mayor of Havana was called the commander–mayor. Famously, Hernán Cortés was once the commander–mayor of Havana.

== Mayors of Havana (1550–1879) ==
- 1550 – Juan de Rojas and Pedro Blasco
- 1551 – Pedro Velázquez and Alonso de Aguilar
- 1552 – Francisco de Yebenes and Diego Soto
- 1553 – Juan Gutiérrez and Leonardo Almendariz
- 1554 – Juan de Ynestrosa and Pedro Blasco
- 1555 – Juan de Ynestrosa and Juan Gutiérrez
- 1556 – Pedro Blasco and Diego de Soto
- 1557 – Diego Soto and Diego López Durán
- 1558 – Diego de Soto and Antonio Recio
- 1559 – Juan Gutiérrez, Diego de Soto and Diego López Durán
- 1560 – Alonso Sánchez del Corral; Pedro Blasco and Gerónimo de Avellaneda
- 1561 – Alonso Suárez de Toledo and Diego de Soto
- 1562 – Pedro Blasco and Francisco Dávalos
- 1563 – Diego de Soto and Francisco Dávalos
- 1564 – Alonso de Rojas and Gómez de Rojas
- 1565 – Diego López Durán and Antón Recio
- 1566 – Bartolomé Cepero and Francisco Dávalos
- 1567 – Diego López Durán and Diego de Soto
- 1568 – Juan Gutiérrez Maribardo and Diego de Soto
- 1569 – Francisco Dávalos and Alonso Rojas
- 1570 – Juan Gutiérrez and Diego de Soto

== Mayors of Havana (1879–1898) ==
- 1879 – Antonio González de Mendoza
- 1879–1883 – Pedro Balboa (Marqués de Balboa)
- 1883–1885 – Pedro González Llorente
- 1885–1886 – Juan Bautista Orduña
- 1886–1887 – Pablo Tapia
- 1887–1889 – Feliciano Ibáñez (Conde de Casa Ibáñez)
- 1889–1891 – Laureano Pequeño González
- 1891 – Ramón de Herrera
- 1891–1893 – Luís García Corujedo
- 1893–1895 – Segundo Álvarez González
- 1895–1897 – Antonio Quesada y Soto
- 1897–1898 – Miguel Díaz Álvarez
- 1898–1899 – Pedro Esteban Gonzalez Larrinaga «Marqués de Esteban»

== Mayors of Havana (1899–1902) ==
This is during the Military Government of Cuba.

- 1899–1900 – Perfecto Lacoste
- 1900–1901 – Alejandro Rodríguez Velazco
- 1901–1902 – Miguel Gener y Rincón

== Mayors of Havana (1902–1958) ==
The Constitution of the Republic of Cuba was created in 1901, and took effect in 1902. The Provisional Government of Cuba occurred between 1906 and 1909.

- 1902 – Carlos de la Torre y Huerta
- 1902–1905 – Juan Ramón O’Farrill
- 1905–1906 – Eligio Bonachea y Palmero
- 1906–1913 – Julio de Cárdenas y Rodríguez
- 1913–1917 – Fernando Freyre de Andrade
- 1917–1921 – Manuel Varona Suárez
- 1921–1923 – Marcelino Díaz de Villegas
- 1923 – Luis Carmona Castaño
- 1923–1926 – José María de la Cuesta Cárdenas
- 1926–1927 – Manuel Pereira Rolandeli
- 1927–1931 – Miguel Mariano Gómez Arias
- 1931–1933 – José Izquierdo Julia
- 1933 – Estanislao Cartañá Borrell
- 1933 – Alberto Blanco Sánchez
- 1933 – Alejandro Vergara Leonard
- 1933–1934 – Rafael Trejo Loredo
- 1934–1935 – Miguel Mariano Gómez Arias
- 1935–1936 – Guillermo Belt Ramírez
- 1936 – Arístides Sosa de Quesada
- 1936–1940 – Antonio Beruff Mendieta
- 1940 – Francisco Rivero San Román
- 1940 – Orosmán Viamontes
- 1940 – Manuel Martínez de Zaldo
- 1940–1944 – Raúl García Menocal y Seva
- 1944 – José Castillo Rodríguez
- 1944–1946 – Raúl García Menocal y Seva
- 1946–1947 – Manuel Fernández Supervielle
- 1947–1950 – Nicolás Castellanos Rivero
- 1950 – José Díaz Garrido
- 1950–1952 – Nicolás Castellanos Rivero
- 1952–1954 – Justo Luis del Pozo Puerto
- 1954–1955 – Justo García Rayneri
- 1954–1958 – Justo Luis del Pozo Puerto
