= Francisco Muñoz Rubalcava =

Cuban revolutionary (1825–1873)

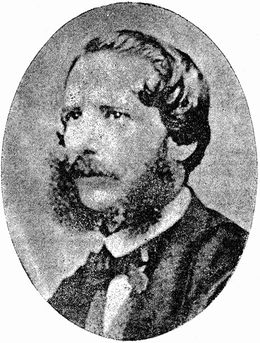
- Born: Francisco Muñoz Rubalcava; June 25, 1825; Santiago de Cuba, Oriente Province, Captaincy General of Cuba, Spanish Empire
- Died: March 6, 1873 (aged 47); Puerto Príncipe, Captaincy General of Cuba, Spanish Empire
- Military career
- Allegiance: Cuba
- Branch: Cuban Liberation Army
- Service years: 1868–1873
- Rank: General
- Conflicts: Ten Years' War

Francisco Muñoz Rubalcava (June 25, 1825 – March 6, 1873) was a Cuban patriot, mambí soldier, and poet who was executed during the Ten Years' War in Cuba.

== Biography ==
Francisco Muñoz Rubalcava was born in Santiago de Cuba in the eastern province of Oriente (now Santiago de Cuba Province), Spanish Cuba, on June 25, 1825.

As a young man, he served as the director of Cuban newspapers in Cárdenas and Puerto Príncipe.

Francisco Muñoz Rubalcava was acquainted with the Masonic Lodge of Las Tunas, involved in the conspiratorial activities taking place in Puerto Príncipe and Bayamo in the summer of 1868. The Santiago de Cuba native suggested that the Tínima Masonic Lodge in Puerto Príncipe (now Camagüey) establish a link with Eastern Masons, who were known for their separatist ideologies.

=== Ten Years' War ===
Amid the Cry of Yara on October 10, 1868, Rubalcava took up arms against the Spanish colonial authorities in Cuba's first war for independence called the Ten Years' War.

In the region of Las Tunas, he was the second-in-command of the insurgent forces, under the command of Vicente García González.

Muñoz Rubalcava entered the uprising on October 19, 1868, when the Las Tunas forces assaulted a Spanish garrison and took control of the town of Manatí. Vicente García, Francisco Muñoz Rubalcava, along with Belisario and Julio Grave de Peralta, were leaders in the uprising in Tunas.

In mid-April 1869, when Vincente Garcia and Col. Rubalcava received notice of the enemy taking a convoy guarded by 300 Spanish soldiers from Manatí towards Las Tunas, they attacked with 150 men. The Spanish military convoy included the combined forces of Gen. Juan de Lesca and two other military officers with the Spanish Army. On April 17, 1869, the mambises attacked the convoy, killing 23 men, and taking some prisoners, among them 7 officers, besides 115 rifles and muskets, a field piece, and other arms.

Muñoz Rubalcava was named Second Chief of the Camagüey forces in 1873, directly reporting to Maj. Gen. Ignacio Agramonte.

== Death ==
Francisco Muñoz Rubalcava was captured by Spanish authorities and tried by a military council. He was sentenced to death and faced execution by firing squad on March 6, 1873, in Puerto Príncipe (now Camagüey), Cuba.
