= Cuban peso =

Currency of Cuba

peso cubano (Spanish)
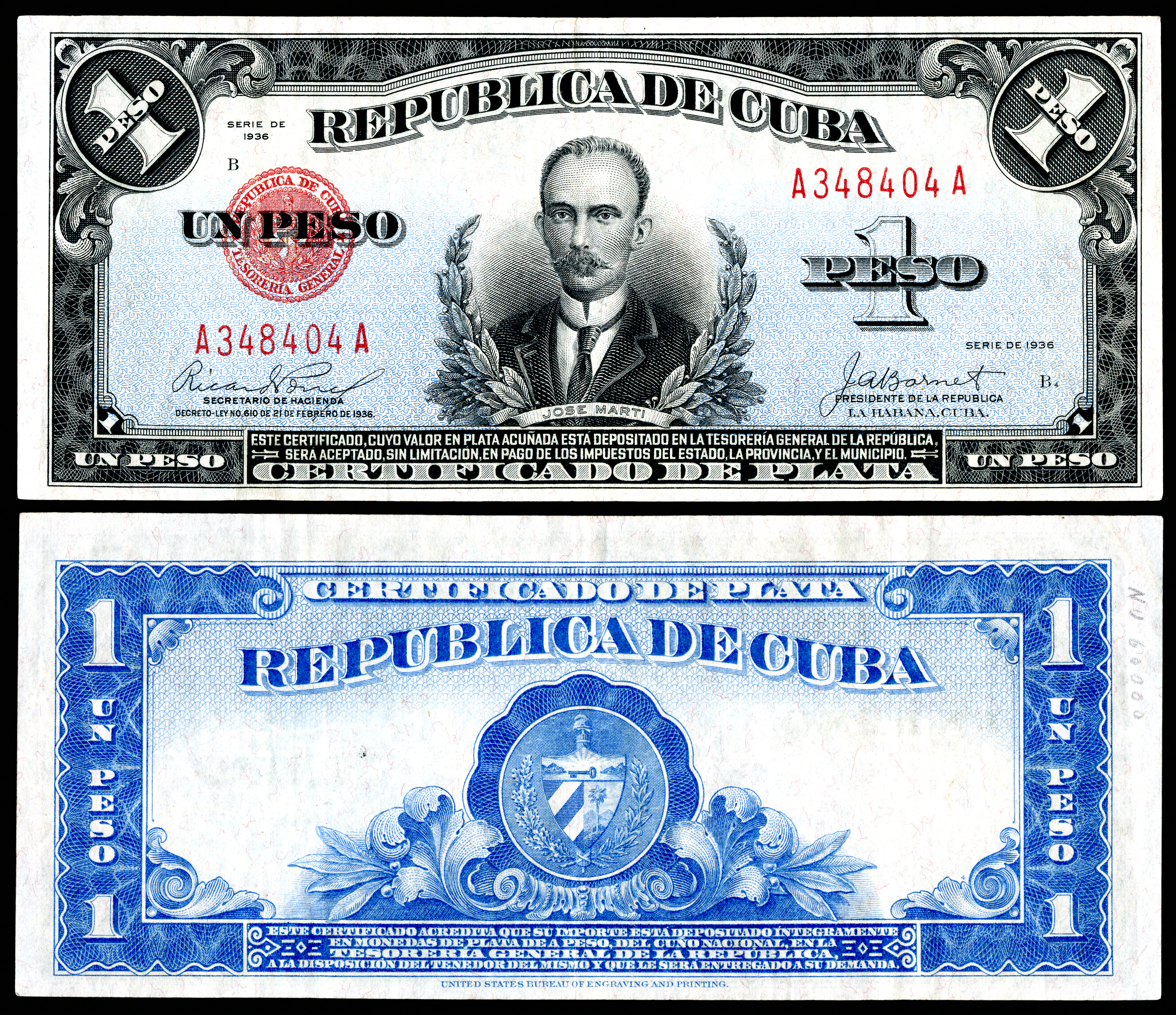
- A one-peso silver certificate

ISO 4217
- Code: CUP (numeric: 192)
- Subunit: 0.01

Units of account
- Symbol: $
- Subunit
- 1/100: centavo
- Symbol
- centavo: ¢ or c

Denominations
- Banknotes: $1, $3, $5, $10, $20, $50, $100, $200, $500, $1,000, $2,000, $5,000, $10,000, $20,000
- Coins: 1¢, 2¢, 5¢, 20¢, $1, $3, $5

Demographics
- User(s): Cuba

Issuance
- Central bank: Central Bank of Cuba
- Website: www.bc.gob.cu

Valuation
- Pegged with: 1 USD = 24 CUP (official); 1 USD = 120 CUP (CADECA office exchange rate in Cuba)

The Cuban peso (peso cubano in Spanish, ISO 4217 code: CUP) also known as moneda nacional (Spanish for 'national currency'), is the official currency of Cuba.

The Cuban peso was established by a Cuban law on October 29, 1914. It began circulating in 1915 at parity with the U.S. dollar until 1959–1960. The Castro government then introduced the socialist planned economy and pegged the peso to the Soviet ruble.

The Soviet Union's collapse in 1991 resulted in what the Castro government called a "Special Period" of difficult economic adjustments for Cuba. From 1994 to 2020 the Cuban peso co-circulated with the Cuban convertible peso (ISO 4217 code "CUC"; colloquially pronounced "kook" in contrast to the CUP, often pronounced "koop"), which was convertible to and fixed against the U.S. dollar, and which was generally available to the public at a rate of 1 USD = 1 CUC = 25 CUP. State enterprises under the socialist planned economy, though, were entitled to exchange CUPs into CUCs and U.S. dollars at the official, subsidized rate of 1 USD = 1 CUC = 1 CUP, within prescribed limits.

From 1 January 2021, Cuba implemented the so-called "Day Zero" of monetary unification, which abolished the Cuban convertible peso as well as the 1 CUP/USD rate for state enterprises. Henceforth the Cuban Peso became the only legal tender in Cuba, CUCs were converted at the rate of 24 CUP/CUC, and a single official exchange rate of 24 CUP/USD became applicable for both public and private transactions. However, demand for hard currency made these exchange rates unavailable in the informal market, where 1 USD is worth over 900 CUP as of November 2026.

== History ==
=== Before 1994 ===
Before 1857, Spanish and Spanish colonial reales circulated in Cuba. From 1857, banknotes were issued specifically for use on Cuba. These were denominated in pesos, with each peso worth 8 reales. From 1869, decimal notes were also issued denominated in centavos, with 100 centavos for each Spanish peso. The Republic of Cuba did not have its own currency until 1915 (Cuban peso), when the first coins of Cuban peso were minted; the first banknotes (silver certificate) were issued in 1935. The Cuban peso and the US dollar had the same value from 1915 to 1959–1960.

In 1960, the peso lost value after the United States imposed an embargo against Cuba and the suspended sugar quota. Fidel Castro then introduced the socialist planned economy to Cuba with the Soviet Union as its new economic partner, and the Cuban peso was pegged to the Soviet ruble at the same exchange rate as with the US dollar (i.e. at 4 old rubles before the 1961 monetary reform, and 0.9 SUR (90 kopeks of the new ruble) afterward).

Foreign exchange was a government monopoly under the socialist planned economy and could not be bought by the general public using Cuban pesos. Foreign currencies were therefore exchanged for coins of the Instituto Nacional de Turismo (INTUR) from 1981 to 1989 and for foreign exchange certificates of the Banco Nacional de Cuba from 1985. These coins or certificates were then used by visitors to buy some luxury goods not available for purchase in the national currency.

=== CUP and CUC, 1994-2020 ===
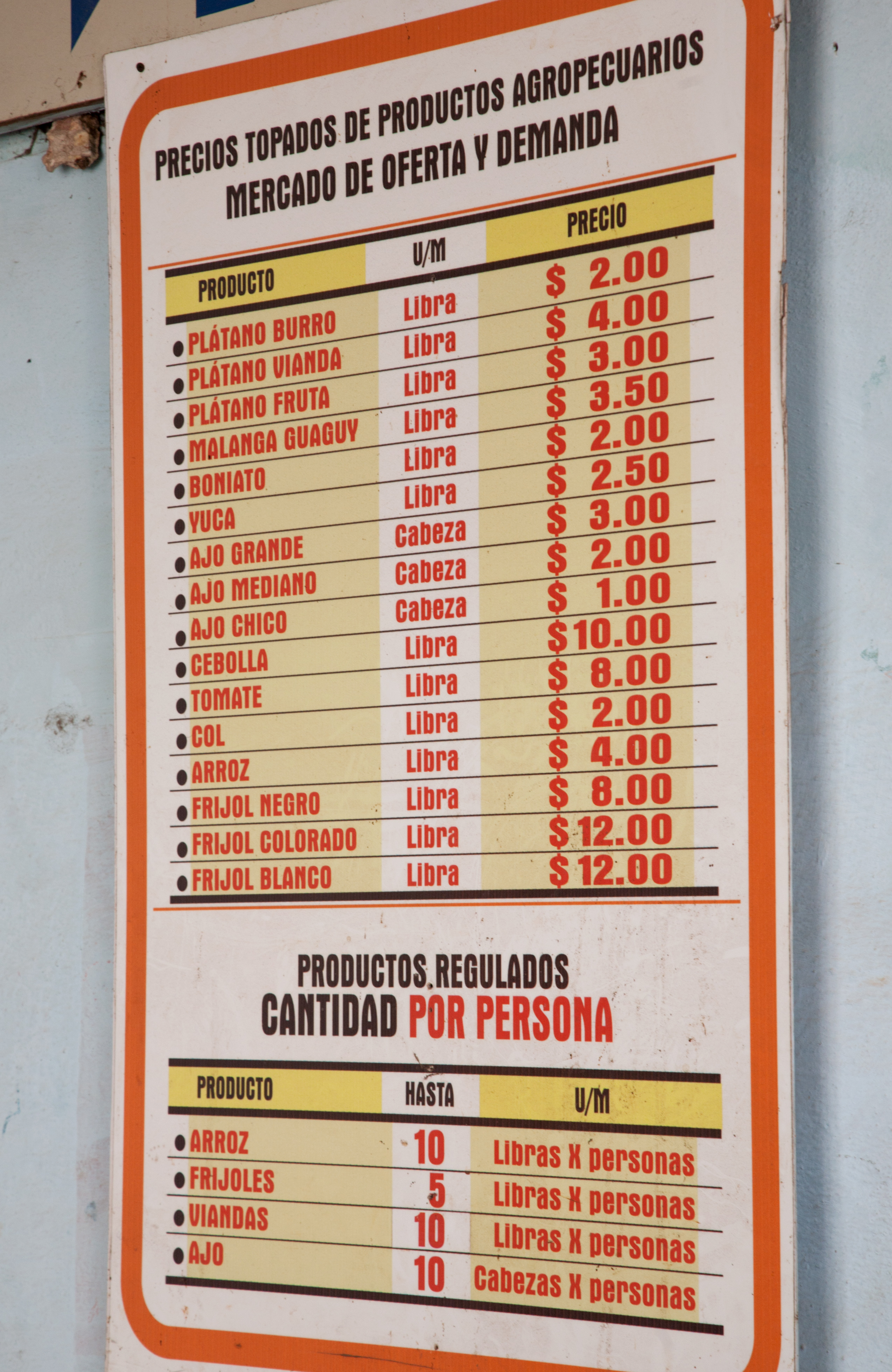
Prices of price-controlled goods in CUP as of 2011.

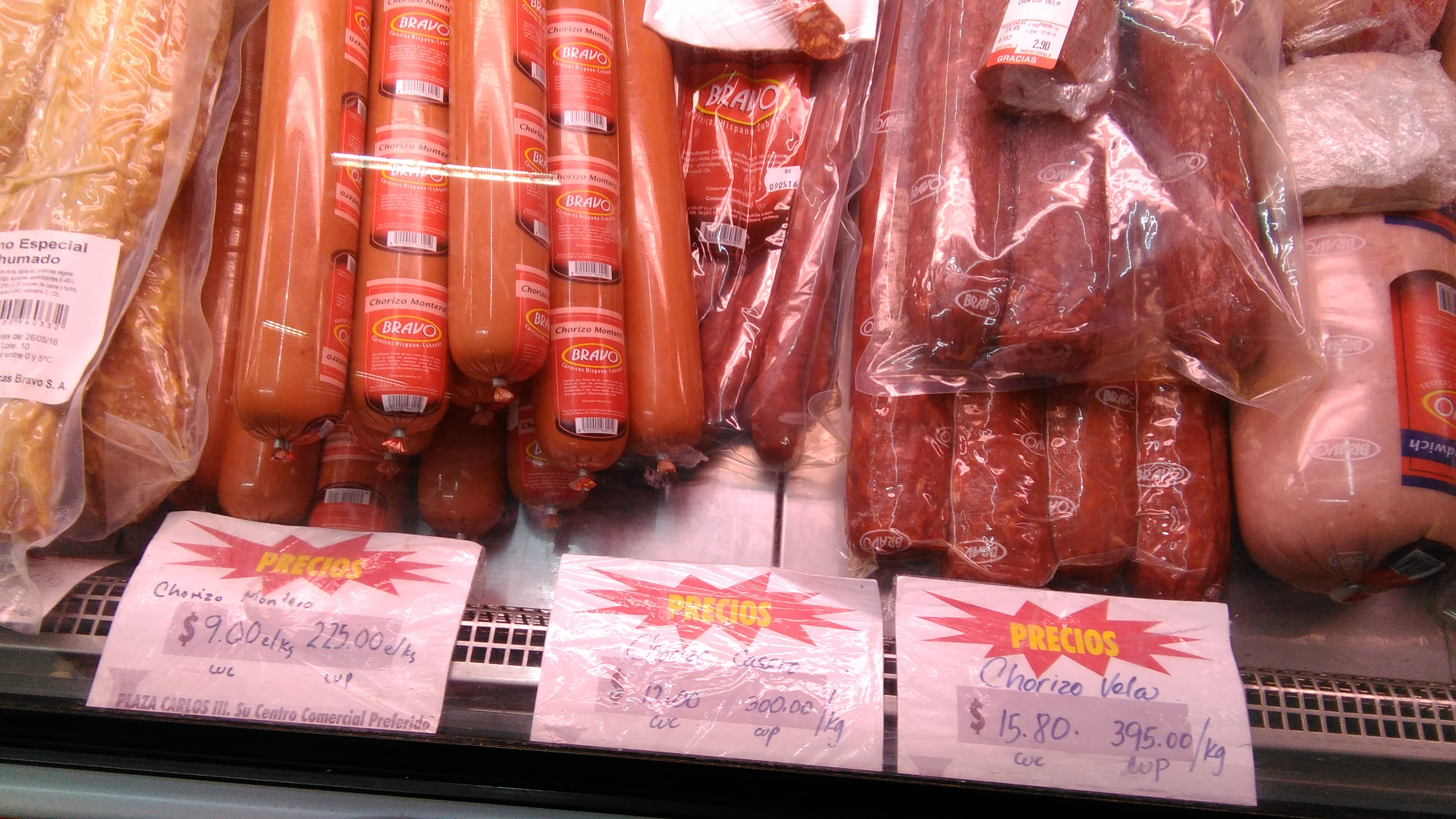
Shop in 2016 displaying prices in CUP and CUC.

The Soviet Union's collapse in 1991 resulted in a difficult Special Period of economic adjustments which required the acquisition of foreign exchange in order to pay for petroleum and other imported goods which used to be easily procured from Cuba's former benefactor. In 1993, the U.S. dollar was made legal tender to encourage much-needed hard currency to enter the economy, and the Cuban peso lost much of its value with its free market exchange rate plunging to as low as 125 CUP/USD.

In 1994 the Cuban convertible peso (CUC) was introduced at par with the US dollar and circulated alongside it. Partial revival of economic confidence then stabilized the Cuban peso to 23-25 CUPs to the CUC or USD, leading to the eventual fixing of exchange rates to 1 USD = 1 CUC = 25 CUP, which was available to the public from 2004 to 2005 and then from 2011-2020 through Cadecas (Casas de Cambio, or Bureau de Change; an exchange rate of 1.08 USD/CUC applied from 2005 to 2011).

In 2004, the CUC replaced the U.S. dollar as a legal tender. The CUC was pegged to the dollar. From 2004 to 2020 a 10% penalty or tax was applied when changing U.S. dollars to CUCs, which can be avoided by exchanging other currencies in Cadecas.

The revival of economic stability after the Special Period from 2000, however, also made possible the revival of features of the socialist planned economy, which involved the distribution of subsidized goods to the public, supported by a system of artificially pegged exchange rates; for instance:

- State-owned businesses earned and spent foreign exchange at the artificial or subsidized "official rate" of 1 USD = 1 CUC = 1 CUP.
- In turn, this made possible the sales of rationed goods to the public who earned salaries in the order of 500 CUP a month (worth only 20 USD at the cash exchange rate, but could buy as much as 500 USD worth of imported rationed goods, should they be available).
- Furthermore, the government also set different exchange rates for different enterprises (e.g. 10 CUP/CUC for the Mariel Special Development Zone).
- Cuban state employees were paid with basic salaries in CUPs, plus performance-based bonuses in CUCs.

Among the effects of this complicated system of exchange rates and subsidies were as follows:

- State companies were dis-incentivized from earning foreign exchange, but the public was incentivized to spend on subsidized imported goods.
- The CUC did not really have a firm backing in convertible currencies, as it can be easily printed to pay state companies and employees. Hence, neither CUC nor CUP was traded internationally, and their import and export is prohibited, so neither could be bought in advance outside Cuba.
- The Cuban economy was described as "dual-track", with the majority of citizens earning only CUPs and dependent on subsidized goods from ration stores, and with a minority earning much bigger salaries in CUCs and foreign exchange by catering to tourists.
- Shops and services were also "dual-track", with rationed goods sold in CUPs, imported or non-essential goods in CUCs, and locations aimed at foreign tourists charging CUC prices much higher than CUP prices paid by Cubans.
- The system where U.S. dollars were worth 1 CUP, 10 CUP or 25 CUP created substantial rent-seeking arbitrage opportunities and incentives to game the system for illicit profits.

This complicated system of multi-track exchange rates and markets, and the inequalities and rent-seeking it spawned, had long been a source of frustration alike to government bureaucrats and to a disgruntled public. In October 2013, the government announced its intention to abolish this multiple exchange rate system and to phase out the CUC. While detailed preparations and new rules were underway, many businesses started to accept both CUPs and CUCs at the rate of 1 CUC = 25 CUP, and higher-value banknotes of 200, 500 and 1000 CUP were introduced. Fears over its financial fallout on state companies, however, delayed the "Day Zero" implementation of monetary unification by several years, until the drying up of foreign exchange reserves in 2020 due to the absence of tourists during the COVID-19 pandemic lockdowns made the further sale of subsidized dollars and goods unaffordable to the state.

=== Monetary unification, 2021 ===
On 10 December 2020, it was announced that "Day Zero" of monetary unification would occur on 1 January 2021, with a single official exchange rate of 24 CUP/USD applying to state companies and private individuals alike, and with the Cuban Convertible Peso to be retired and exchanged at the rate of 24 CUP/CUC until the end of 2021. While technically described as a devaluation from the official 1 CUP/USD used in government and state business books, for the public it was viewed as state enterprises merely catching up to the reality of 24 CUP/USD that had always existed in the private sector.

=== Inflation ===
During 2021, due to a shortage in foreign currency, it became difficult or impossible for private individuals and businesses to exchange CUP for hard currency at the official exchange rate of 24 CUP/USD. Demand for hard currency drove a black market in currency exchange, with 1 USD being worth around 100 CUP by January 2022. The price of the dollar continued to increase over the following years, reaching 200 CUP in October 2022, 300 CUP in February 2024, 400 CUP in August 2025, 500 CUP in February 2026, 600 CUP in June 2026, 700 CUP in September 2026, 800 CUP in October 2026, and 900 CUP in November 2026.

On December 18, 2025, Cuba introduced another official exchange rate, which started at 410 CUP/USD. It is a managed float exchange rate set much closer to the black market exchange rate.

== Coins ==
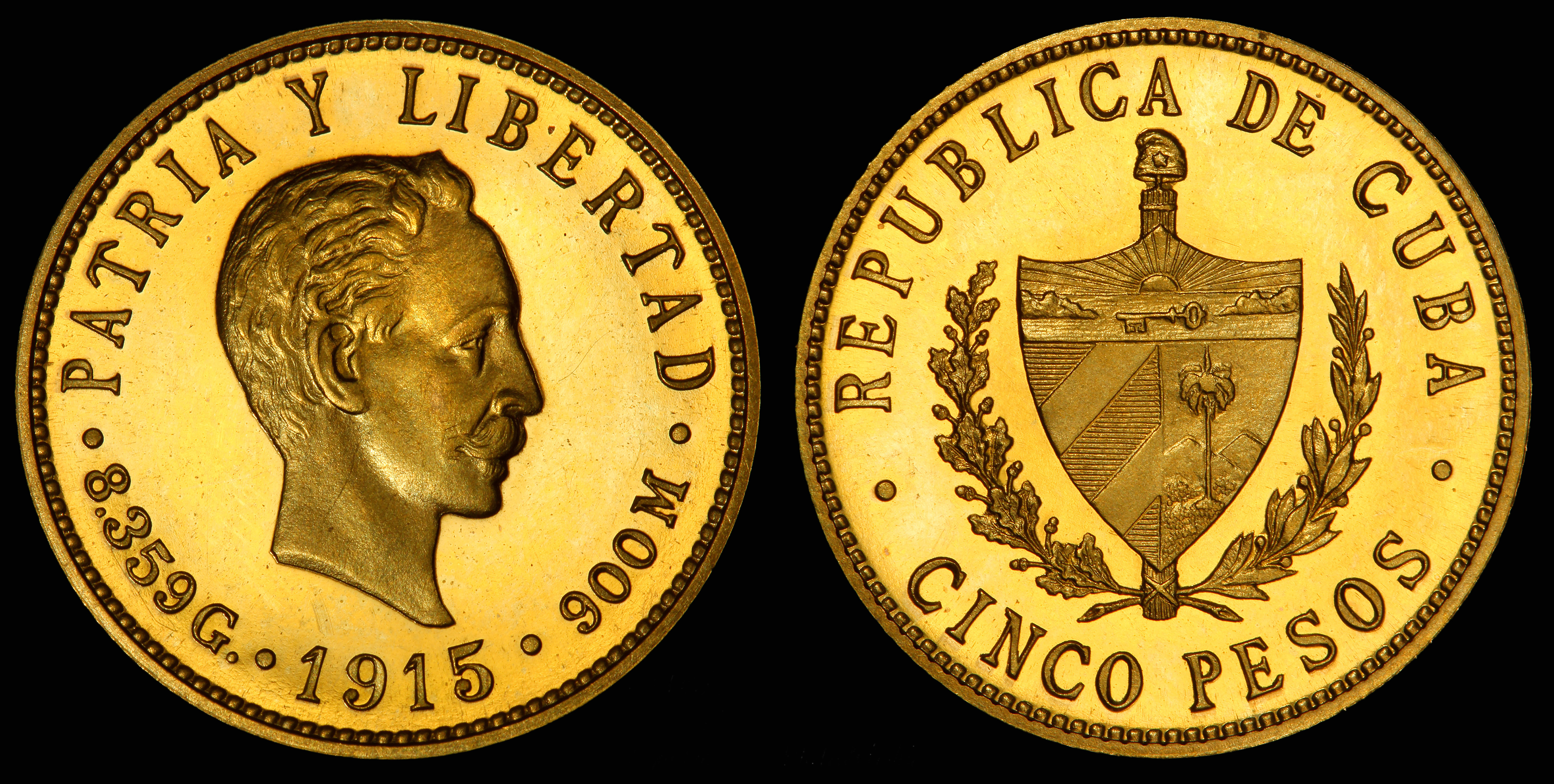
Gold 5 Peso coin depicting José Martí and the Coat of arms of Cuba, engraved by Charles E. Barber, Chief Engraver of the United States Mint and struck at the Philadelphia Mint. The 1915 gold 5-peso coin (on average) contains 8.3592 grams of gold (0.9000 fine) and weighs 0.2419 of an ounce.

=== Before 1959 ===
In 1897 and 1898, pesos were issued by revolutionary forces promoting independence. In 1915, cupro-nickel 1, 2 and 5 centavos, silver 10, 20 and 40 centavos and 1 peso, and gold 1, 2, 4, 5, 10 and 20 peso coins were introduced. These coins were designed by Charles E. Barber, who also designed the Barber dimes, quarters, half-dollars for the US. The coins were minted at the US mint at Philadelphia. The gold coins and 2 centavos were not produced after 1916, with the large star design 1 peso ceasing production in 1934. A new silver peso showing a woman, representing the Cuban Republic, beneath a star (the "ABC peso") was issued from 1934 to 1939. Finally, a centennial of Jose Marti commemorative peso (also minted in 50, 25, and 1 centavos denominations) was produced in 1953.

Brass 1 and 5 centavos were issued in 1943, and with copper nickel composition sporadically from 1915 to 1958. Beginning in 1915, 2, 5, 10, 20 and 40 centavos coins were occasionally minted. The last 10, 20, and 40 centavo coins were produced in 1952; these were commemorative issues celebrating the fiftieth year of the republic. As mentioned above, in 1953, silver 25 and 50 centavos commemorative coins were also issued. These were the last silver coins issued for circulation. The last US produced coin was the 1961 five centavo piece.

=== After 1959 ===
In 1962, cupro-nickel 20 and 40 centavos were introduced, followed, in 1963, by aluminium 1 and 5 centavos. In 1969, aluminium 20 centavos were introduced, followed by aluminium 2 centavos and brass 1 peso in 1983. Cupro-nickel 3 peso coins were introduced in 1990, with brass-plated-steel 1 peso and nickel-clad-steel 3 peso coins following in 1992. 40 centavo coins were withdrawn from circulation around July 2004 and are no longer accepted as payment. In 2017, the Banco Central de Cuba introduced bi-metallic 5 pesos coin (the difference is the denomination and composition (with a cupronickel ring and a brass center plug). Coins currently in common circulation are 5 and 20 centavos and 1, 3 and 5 pesos; 1 and 2 centavo coins are rarely seen (due to their tiny value) but are still valid.

Coins of the Cuban peso
Image	Value	Technical parameters				Description			Date of first minting
Image	Value	Diameter	Thickness	Mass	Composition	Edge	Obverse	Reverse	Date of first minting
	1 centavo	16.76 mm	1.4 mm	0.75 g	Aluminium (aluminium 97.15%, magnesium 2.5%, manganese 0.35%)	Smooth	Coat of arms of Cuba, legend "REPUBLICA DE CUBA", denomination "UN CENTAVO"	"PATRIA Y LIBERTAD" (Fatherland and Liberty) or "PATRIA O MUERTE" (Fatherland or Death), Roman numeral "I" within a five-pointed star, date of issue	1963
	2 centavos	19.31 mm	1.7 mm	1 g	Aluminium (aluminium 97.15%, magnesium 2.5%, manganese 0.35%)	Smooth	Coat of arms of Cuba, legend "REPUBLICA DE CUBA", denomination "DOS CENTAVOS"	"PATRIA O MUERTE" (Fatherland or Death), Roman numeral "II" within a five-pointed star, date of issue	1983
	5 centavos	21.21 mm	1.81 mm	1.5 g	Aluminium (aluminium 97.15%, magnesium 2.5%, manganese 0.35%)	Smooth	Coat of arms of Cuba, legend "REPUBLICA DE CUBA", denomination "CINCO CENTAVOS"	"PATRIA Y LIBERTAD" (Fatherland and Liberty) or "PATRIA O MUERTE" (Fatherland or Death), Roman numeral "V" within a five-pointed star, date of issue	1963
	20 centavos	24 mm	2.15 mm	2 g	Aluminium (aluminium 97.15%, magnesium 2.5%, manganese 0.35%)	Smooth	Coat of arms of Cuba, legend "REPUBLICA DE CUBA", denomination "VEINTE CENTAVOS"	"PATRIA O MUERTE" (Fatherland or Death), Roman numeral "XX" within a five-pointed star, date of issue	1969
	1 peso	24.5 mm	1.9 mm	5.52 g	Brass-plated steel	Segmented reeding	Coat of arms of Cuba, legend "REPUBLICA DE CUBA", date of issue	"PATRIA O MUERTE" (Fatherland or Death), portrait of José Martí	1992
	3 pesos	26.5 mm		9 g	Copper-nickel	Reeded	Coat of arms of Cuba, legend "REPUBLICA DE CUBA", denomination "TRES PESOS"	"PATRIA O MUERTE" (Fatherland or Death), portrait of Che Guevara	1992
	5 pesos	25.3 mm	2.27 mm	7.5 g	Brass-plated steel center in a Copper-nickel-plated steel ring	Reeded	Coat of arms of Cuba, legend "REPUBLICA DE CUBA", denomination "CINCO PESOS"	"PATRIA O MUERTE" (Fatherland or Death), portrait of Antonio Maceo	2016

=== INTUR coins, 1981-1989 ===
Between 1988 and 1989, the National Institute of Tourism (Instituto Nacional de Turismo, "INTUR") issued "Visitors' Coinage" for use by tourists. In 1981, cupro-nickel 5, 10, 25 and 50 centavos and 1 peso were introduced, followed in 1988 by aluminium 1, 5, 10, 25 and 50 centavos. The INTUR coins were demonetized on October 15, 2001 and were replaced by convertible pesos (CUC).

=== CUC coins, 1994-2020 ===
The convertible peso was also divided into 100 centavos. In 1994, coins were introduced in denominations of 5, 10, 25, and 50 centavos and 1 peso in nickel-plated steel. The rare bimetallic 5-peso coin was introduced in 1999, followed by the 1-centavo coin in 2000. These CUC coins co-circulated with CUP coins, with both types of coin distinguishable by differences in their color (mostly nickel-plated steel for CUCs, versus aluminum or brass for CUPs) as well as the octagonal shape visible in the outer round rim of all CUC coins.

== Banknotes ==
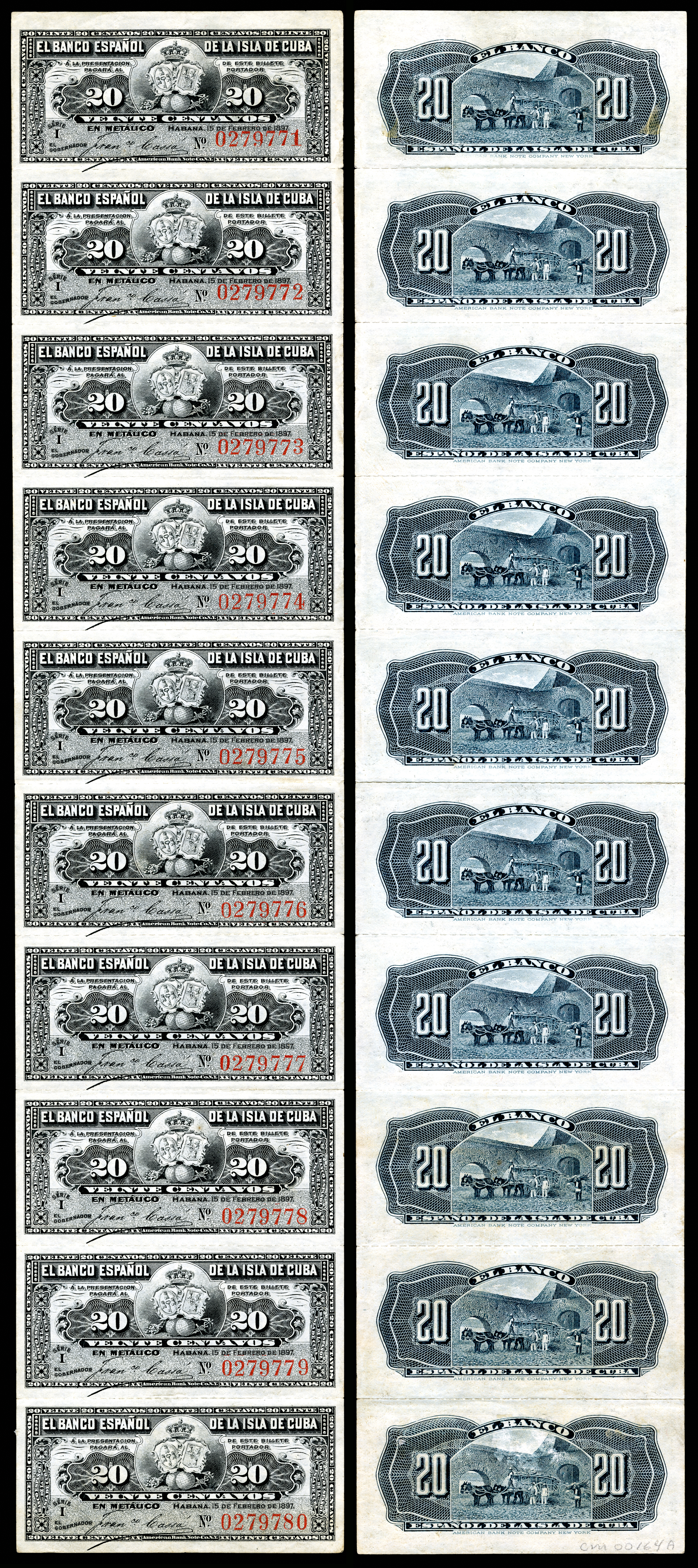
Uncut strip of 20 centavos notes

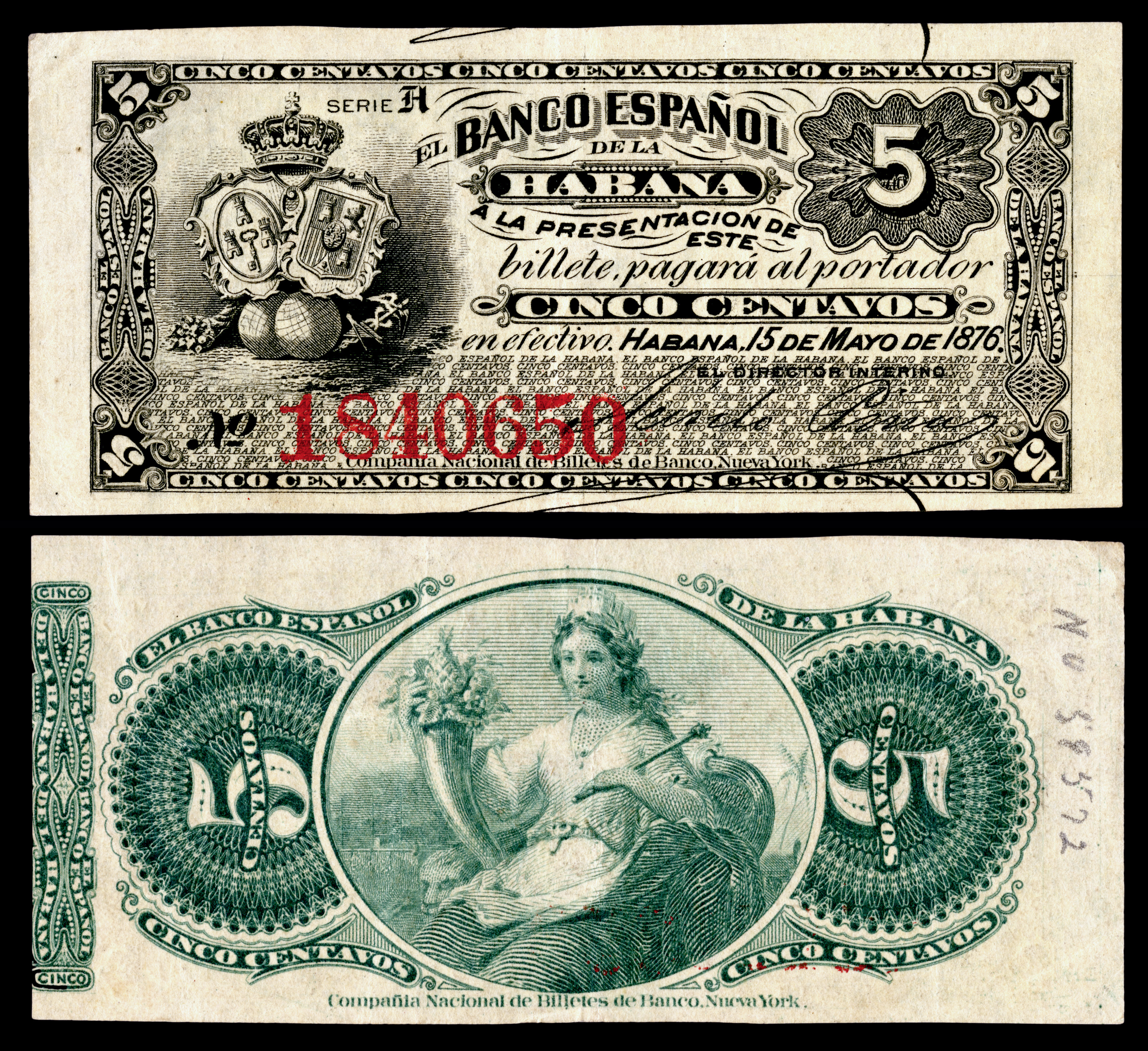
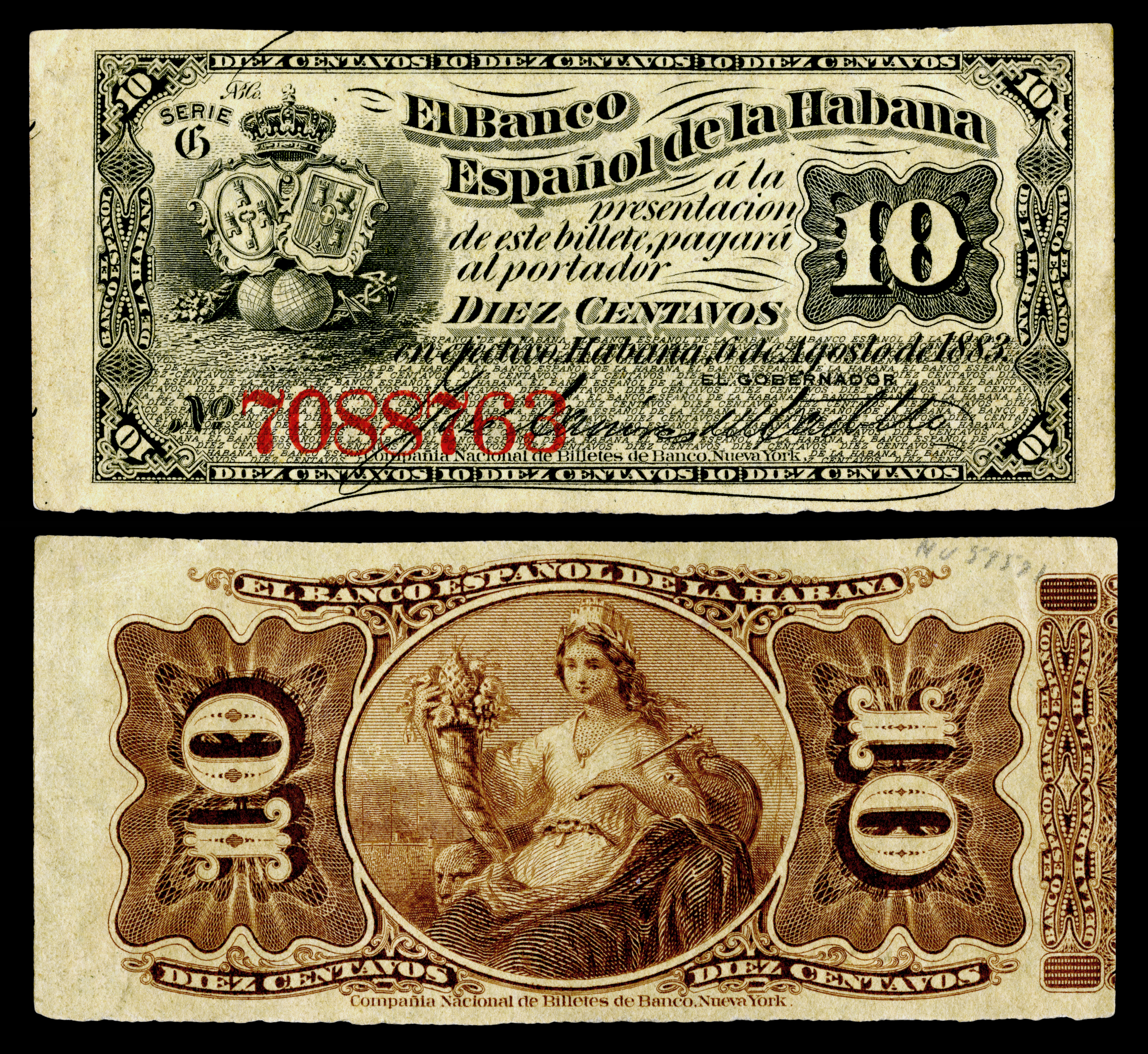
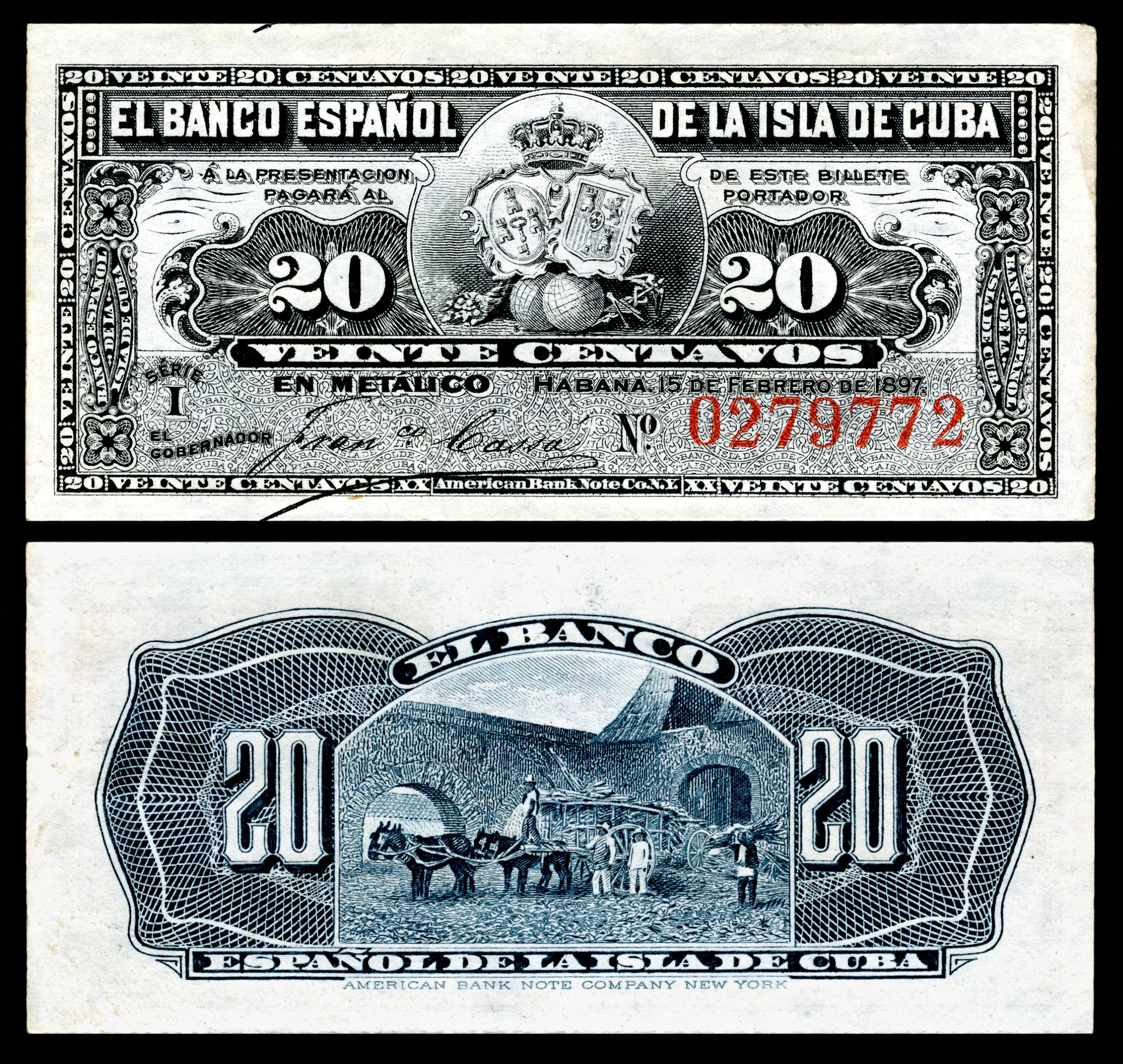
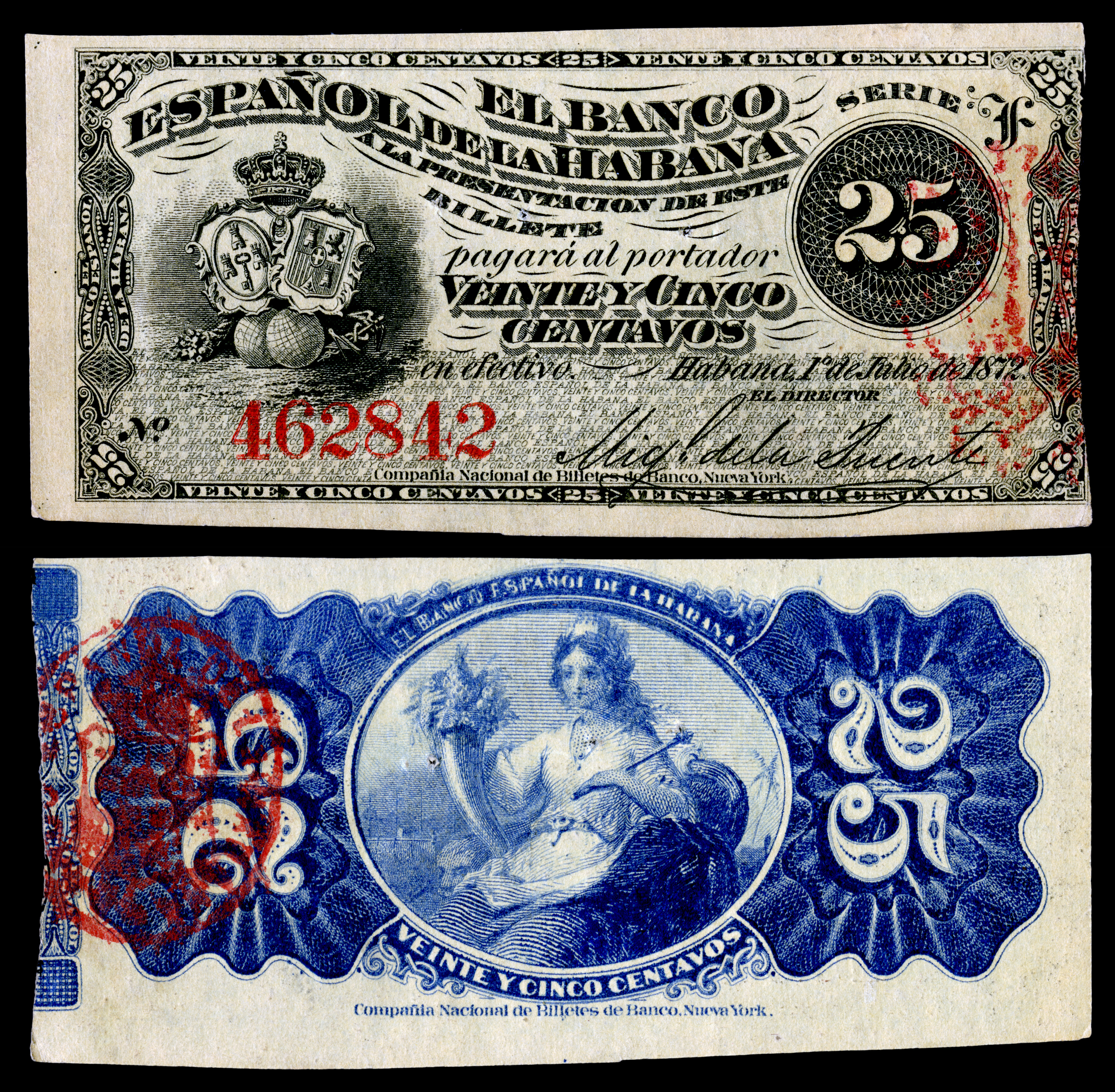
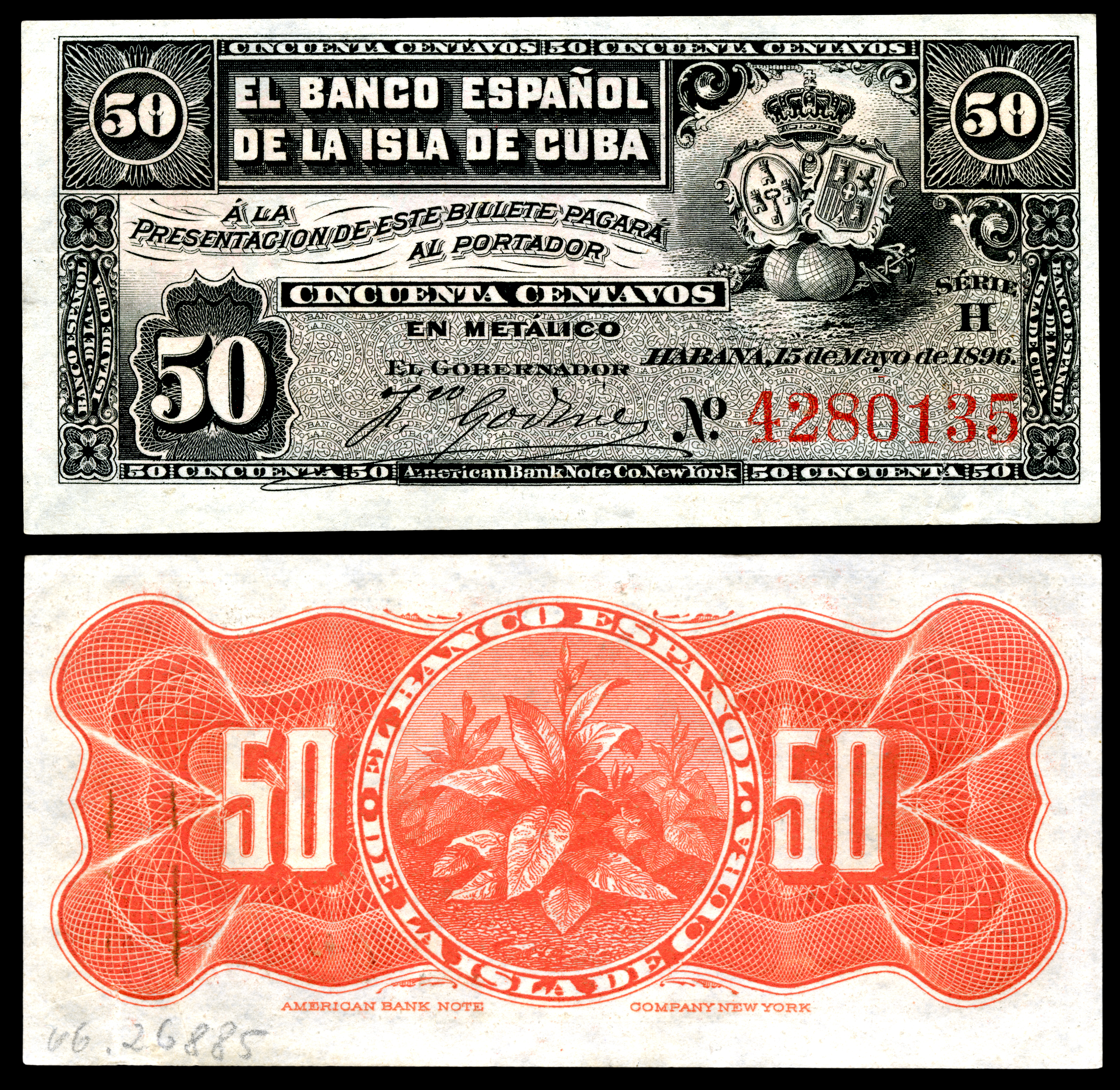
5, 10, 20, 25, 50 centavos

=== Before 1959 ===
Under the Spanish Administration, the Banco Español de la Habana introduced Cuba's first issue of banknotes in 1857 in denominations of 50, 100, 300, 500 and 1,000 dollars. The 25 peso denomination was introduced in 1867, and the 5 and 10 peso denominations in 1869. During the Ten Years' War, notes were issued dated 1869 in the name of the Republic of Cuba in denominations of 50 centavos, 1, 5, 10, 50, 500 and 1000 pesos.

In 1872, 5, 10, 25 and 50 centavo, and 1 and 3 peso notes were introduced by the Banco Español de la Habana. In 1891, the Treasury issued notes for 5, 10, 20, 50, 100 and 200 pesos. In 1896, the name of the bank was changed to the El Banco Español de la Isla de Cuba, and it issued notes in denominations of 5 and 50 centavos and 1, 5, 10, 50, 100, 500 and 1000 pesos, followed by 10 and 20 centavos in 1897.

In 1905, the National Bank of Cuba (Banco Nacional de Cuba) issued notes for 1, 2, 5 and 50 pesos. However, the 1905 banknotes were not issued (source: Pick's catalog). In January 1905, Banco Nacional declared its intention to put into circulation one million pesos in banknotes without having obtained explicit approval from the Cuban government. The notes were printed by the American Bank Note Company and sent to the bank's head office in Havana. The designs included President Tomás Estrada Palma and some of his cabinet members, the signing authorities being those of the bank officials. Members of the Cuban Congress objected to the proposed issuance on the grounds that the bank was attempting to issue banknotes without having received authorization from Congress. The bank's president, Edmund G. Vaughan, insisted that its charter, which had been approved during the period of United States occupation (1906-1909) allowed the issuance and that further consent from the government was therefore unnecessary. Nevertheless, the issuance was stopped and the notes were destroyed. The dispute led to demands that legislation should be passed to regulate banking in the Cuban republic.

In 1934, the Government introduced silver certificates (certificados de plata) in denominations of 1, 5, 10, 20 and 50 pesos, followed by 100 pesos in 1936 and 500 and 1000 pesos in 1944.

=== Silver certificates ===
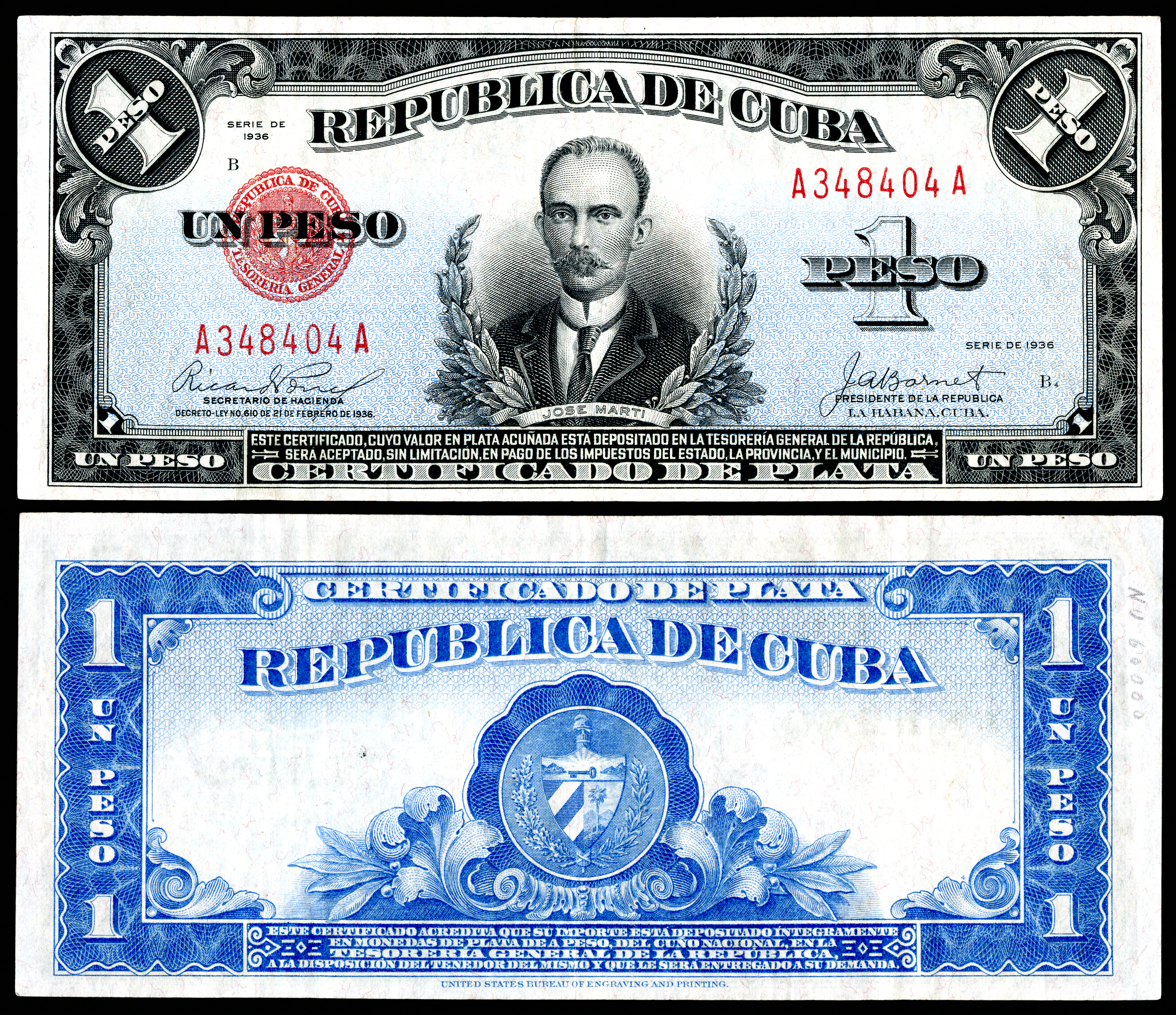
República de Cuba, one silver peso (1936)

During the latter half of 1933, Cuba passed a series of laws to enact the production of Silver certificates (Certificado De Plata). Cuban silver certificates were designed, engraved, and printed by the US Treasury's Bureau of Engraving and Printing from 1934 to 1949 and circulated in Cuba between 1935 and the early 1950s. The eight series of notes were dated 1934, 1936, 1936A, 1938, 1943, 1945, 1948, and 1949 and ranged from one peso to 100 pesos. A Cuban representative was on-site in Washington DC to consult and approve designs.

=== Banco Nacional de Cuba (National Bank of Cuba) ===
In 1949, the Banco Nacional de Cuba resumed paper money production, introducing notes in denominations of 1, 5, 10 and 20 pesos that year, followed by notes in denominations of 50, 100, 500, 1000 and 10,000 pesos in 1950. Denominations above 100 pesos were not continued.

With the introduction of a socialist planned economy, the Banco Nacional demonetised all previous banknotes on August 7, 1961, and replaced them with new banknotes that were printed in Czechoslovakia by STC: the changeover was announced on August 4, and only residents in Cuba were allowed to exchange small amounts on August 6 and 7. The three-peso note was introduced in 1983.

=== Banco Central de Cuba (Central Bank of Cuba) ===
In 1997, the functions of Banco Nacional as a central bank, including issuing notes and coins, were transferred to a newly created entity, the Central Bank of Cuba. This is the Cuban centre of economics. The 1961 bank notes were demonetized in May 2002.

In 2015, the 200, 500, and 1,000 peso notes were (re-)introduced. In March 2026, amid the crisis affecting the country, the Central Bank of Cuba announced the issue of 2,000 and 5,000 CUP notes, with a value of approximately 4 USD and 10 USD in the black market respectively on the day of their announcement. This was followed by the issuance of 10,000 CUP (14 USD) and 20,000 CUP (28 USD) banknotes in September of that year.

There are 14 different denominations of CUP banknotes currently in circulation: $1, $3, $5, $10, $20, $50, $100, $200, $500, $1,000, $2,000, $5,000, $10,000, and $20,000. This banknote series is the only valid currency after the 2021 monetary unification when the convertible peso was retired.

Banknotes of the Cuban peso (Current issues)
Value	Obverse	Reverse
1 peso	José Martí	Fidel Castro and his men entering Havana, (January 8, 1959)
3 pesos	Che Guevara	Che Guevara cutting sugar cane
5 pesos	Antonio Maceo	Conference between Antonio Maceo and Spanish General A. Martinez Campos at Mangos de Baragua (1878)
10 pesos	Máximo Gómez	"War of the people"
20 pesos	Camilo Cienfuegos	Banana harvest and fieldwork ("Development of Agriculture")
50 pesos	Calixto García	Genetic and Biotechnological Centre (es)
100 pesos	Carlos Manuel de Céspedes	Anti-imperialistic tribune "José Martí", Havana
200 pesos	Frank País	Cuartel Moncada, Santiago de Cuba
500 pesos	Ignacio Agramonte	Asamblea Constituyente (Constituent Assembly), Guáimaro
1,000 pesos	Julio Antonio Mella	University of Havana
2,000 pesos	Mariana Grajales Cuello	Monument to Mariana Grajales
5,000 pesos	Celia Sánchez	Memorial sculpture of Celia Sánchez
10,000 pesos	Haydée Santamaría	Casa de las Américas
20,000 pesos	Vilma Espín	Federation of Cuban Women

=== Foreign Exchange Certificates, 1985 ===
In 1985, the Banco Nacional de Cuba issued foreign exchange certificates in denominations of 1, 3, 5, 10, 20, 50 and 100 pesos (not equivalent to the CUP). After 1994 these were replaced by the CUC or the convertible peso.

=== CUC banknotes, 1994-2020 ===
From 1994 to 2020, the Banco Nacional de Cuba and Banco Central de Cuba issued CUC banknotes in denominations of 1, 3, 5, 10, 20, 50 and 100 pesos. These CUC banknotes co-circulated with CUP banknotes, but despite the huge 25:1 ratio in their values, they were distinguishable by the fact that CUC notes featured monuments, while CUP notes featured portraits.

== Exchange rates ==
Commercial bank exchange rates are published on their Facebook page by the Cuban bank, Banco Metropolitano.

Current CUP exchange rates
From Google Finance:	AUD CAD CHF CNY EUR GBP HKD JPY USD EUR JPY USD
From Yahoo! Finance:	AUD CAD CHF CNY EUR GBP HKD JPY USD EUR JPY USD
From XE.com:	AUD CAD CHF CNY EUR GBP HKD JPY USD EUR JPY USD
From OANDA:	AUD CAD CHF CNY EUR GBP HKD JPY USD EUR JPY USD

== See also ==
- Cuban convertible peso
- Central banks and currencies of the Caribbean
- Economy of Cuba
- Demurrage currency
