= Silver certificate (Cuba) =

Cuban banknote

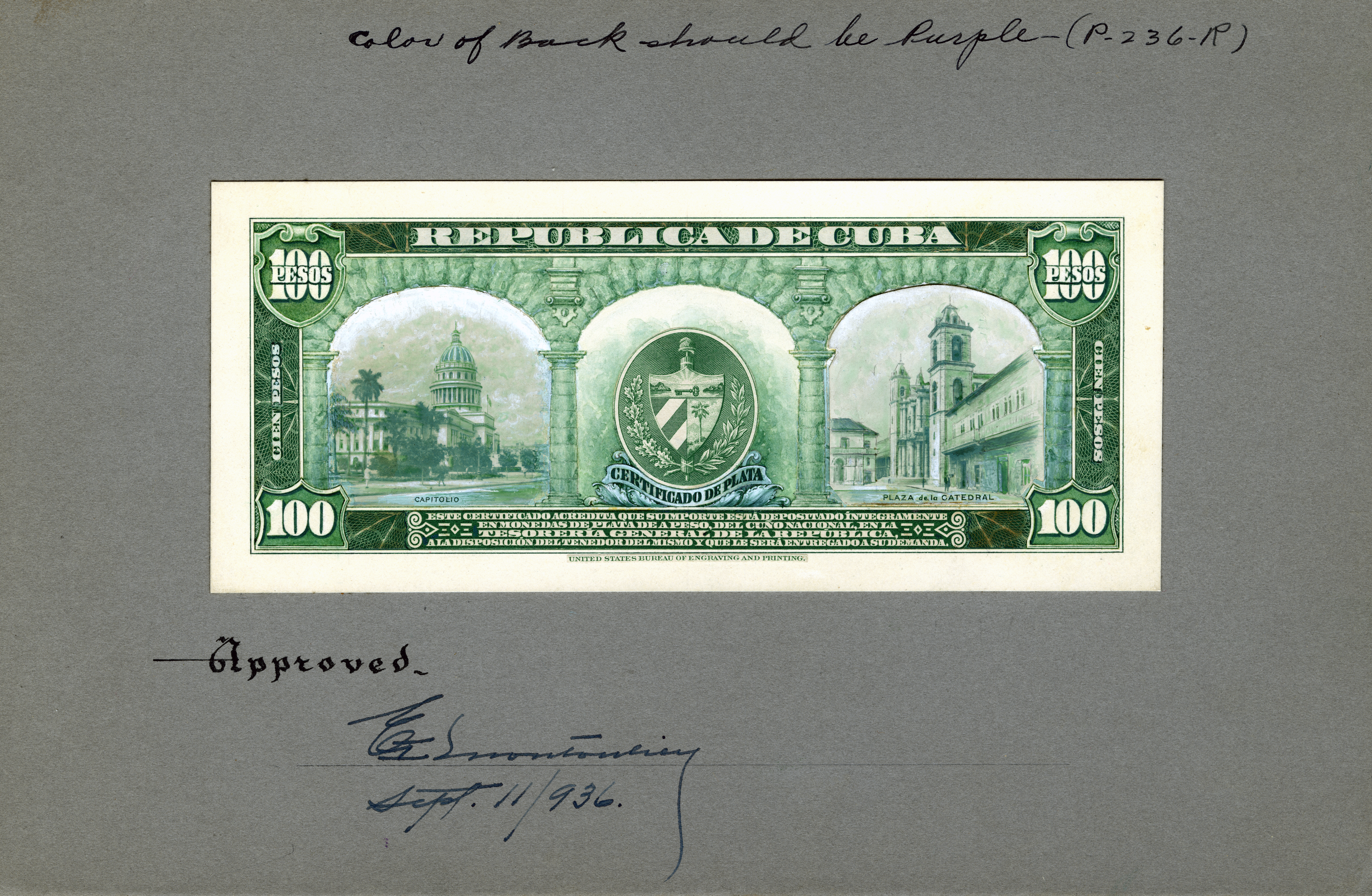
BEP progress proof reverse for a 1930s Cuban 100 peso silver certificate depicting the Cuban coat of arms.

Cuban silver certificates (Spanish: Certificado De Plata) were banknotes issued by the Cuban government between 1934 and 1949 (and circulated from 1935 to the early 1950s). Prior and subsequent issues of Cuban banknotes were engraved and printed by nongovernmental private bank note companies in the United States, but the series from 1934 to 1949 were designed, engraved, and printed by the US government at the Bureau of Engraving and Printing (BEP).

The first Cuban banknotes were issued in 1857 for the Banco Español De La Habana. (Note: In denominations of 50, 100, 300, 500, and 1,000 pesos.) Beginning in the late 1860s, Cuba contracted the National Bank Note Company (NBNC) for two issues of banknotes in 1869 and 1872. After absorbing NBNC, the American Bank Note Company (ABNC) engraved and printed Cuban banknotes for issues in 1889, 1896, 1897, 1905 for the National Bank of Cuba, 1944, and a 1949–50 issue for the Banco Nacional De Cuba (printed until 1960). Between 1905 and the introduction of BEP issued Cuban silver certificates in 1934, no banknotes were produced.

== Cuban silver certificates made by the Bureau of Engraving and Printing ==
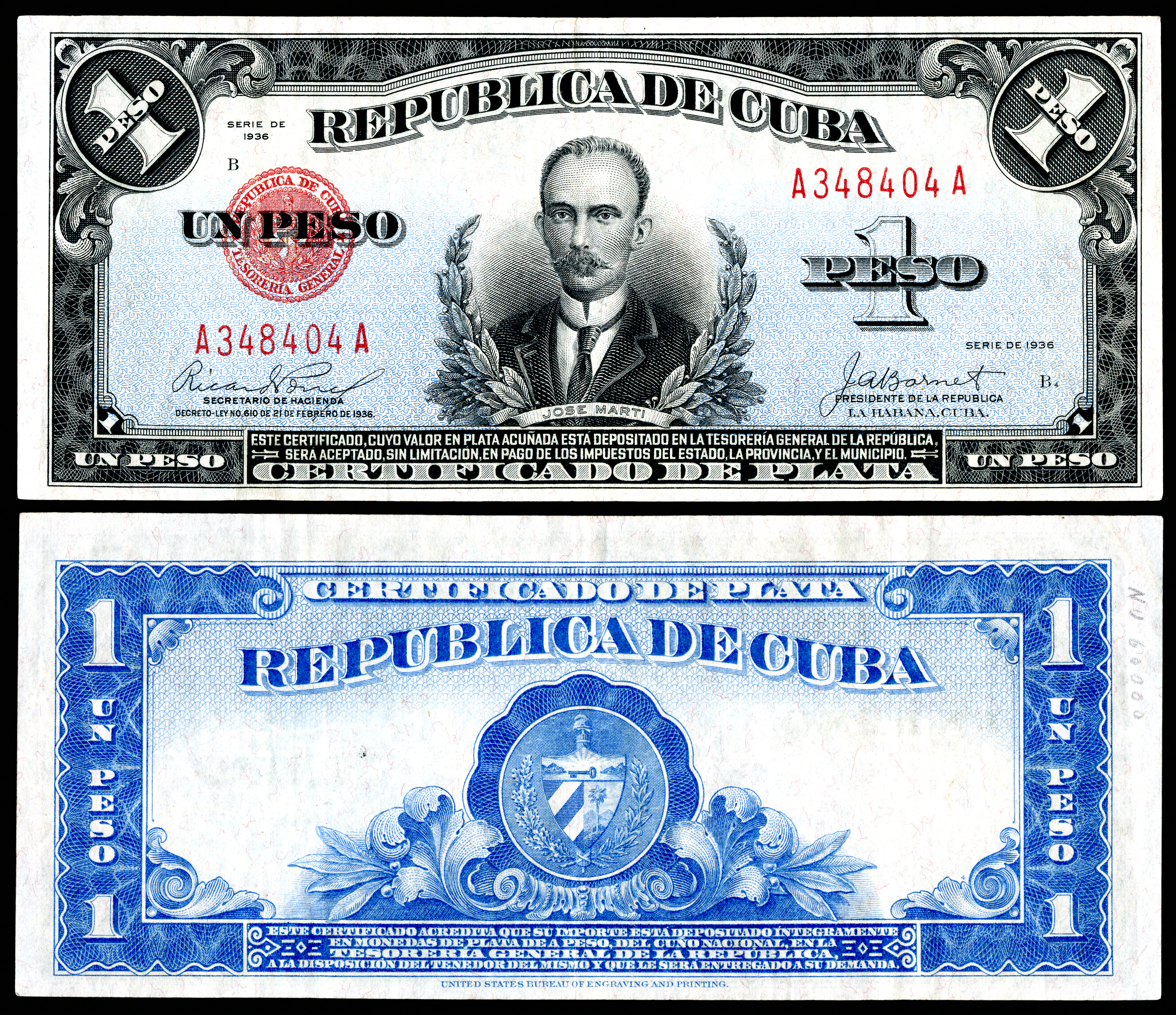
República de Cuba, one silver peso (1936)

The legal foundation for the issuance of Cuban silver certificates began with a Cuban law passed on 10 May 1933 that authorized the production of $6,000,000 in silver pesos in order to back an equal number of silver certificates. On 11 December 1933, the Cuban government had announced that it planned to issue a total of $17,000,000 in silver certificates. In a letter dated 2 March 1934, Cuban Ambassador Manuel Márquez Sterling wrote to Secretary of State Cordell Hull requesting that the Bureau of Engraving and Printing (BEP) prepare silver certificates on behalf of the Republic of Cuba. The coining of Cuban silver pesos began pursuant to Decree-Law No. 93 (22 March 1934) and it was announced that both the coins and banknotes would be produced by the United States. Treasury Secretary Henry Morgenthau Jr. gave initial authorization to the Cuban request to engage the BEP on 23 April 1934. Though not exhaustive, there were several additional legal changes to Cuba's financial infrastructure. Silver certificates could be used to pay duties, taxes and other fees, without limit (Decree-Law No. 153, 19 April 1934) and should be accepted in the same manner as silver coins (Decree-Law No. 176, 27 April 1934). On 11 May 1934 the design process began at the Bureau of Engraving and Printing.

=== Development and production ===
The physical specifications for the Cuban issue were roughly the same size as US notes – printed on the same Crane & Co. 75% linen 25% cotton blend (but only containing red security fibers versus red and blue). The seal and serial numbers printed in red, 12 notes per sheet, with the facsimile signatures of the Secretario de Hacienda (left) and Presidente de la República (right).

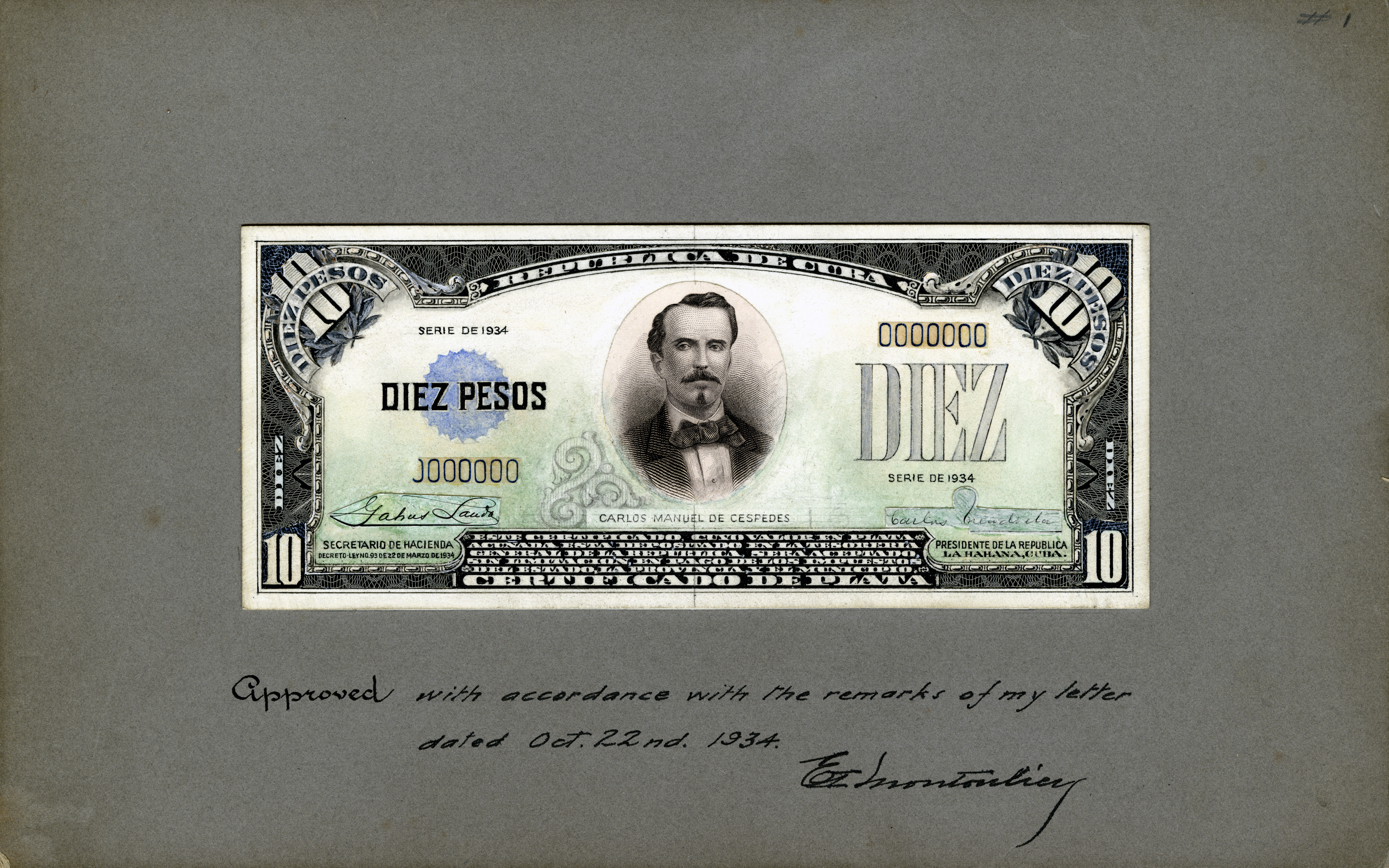
Approval signature of Eduardo I. Montoulieu on a BEP artist proof

Approval is required at major stages in the design of any currency. BEP procedure at the time required an approval signature on the artist's renderings and proof mock-ups. Eduardo I. Montoulieu served as an authorized delegate of the Cuban government during the design and engraving phases. In 1915, Montoulieu served as a technical representative for Cuba during the minting of Cuban coins at the Philadelphia Mint. His approval of the Series 1934 BEP designs can be seen on the background matte. Montoulieu would later become Cuban Treasury Secretary three times during two administrations.

== Issuance ==
Between 1934 (when the BEP was engaged to produce the silver certificates) and 1949 (the delivery of the last series of notes) Cuba's government was fairly volatile. In the space of 15 years, Cuba had seven leaders: Carlos Mendieta, José Agripino Barnet, Miguel Mariano Gómez, Federico Laredo Brú, Fulgencio Batista, Ramón Grau, and Carlos Prío Socarrás. In the same period of time, Cuba's Ministry of the Treasury changed leadership at least 20 times. (Note: In chronological order from 1934 to 1949: Joaquin Martinez Saenz, Dr. Gabriel Landa, Manuel Despaigne (third non-consecutive appointment), Ricardo Ponce, Dr. German Wolter del Rio, Dr. Manuel Dorta Duque, Eduardo I. Montoulieu (first appointment), Dr. Manuel Gimenez Lanier, Amadeo Lopez Castro, Dr. Oscar Garcia Montes, Dr. Joaquin Ochotorena, Eduardo I. Montoulieu (second non-consecutive appointment), Andres Domingo y Morales del Castillo, Dr. Oscar Garcia Montes (second non-consecutive appointment), Jose Miguel Irisarri, Eduardo I. Montoulieu (third non-consecutive appointment), Dr. Mario Diaz Cruz, Dr. Manuel F. Supervielle, Jorge Ruiz Cerda, Isauro Valdes Moreno, and Antonio Prío Socarrás.)

Overview/summary by series of Cuban silver certificates
| Series | Secretario de Hacienda | Presidente de la República | Denominations (Peso) | Issue |
|---|---|---|---|---|
| 1934 | (Gabriel Landa); Manuel Despaigne | Carlos Mendieta | 1,5,10,20,50 | 7,930,000 notes (received 1935) |
| 1936 (Note: The 100 peso note (1936) was signed by Wolter del Rio and Máximo Gómez.) | Ricardo Ponce | José Agripino Barnet | 1,5,10,20,50,100 | 2,295,000 notes (received 1936) (Note: The 100 peso note received 1937.) |
| 1936A | German Wolter del Rio | Máximo Gómez | 1,5,10,20,50 | 4,325,000 notes (received 1936) (Note: The one peso note received 1936–37.) |
| 1938 | Manuel Gimenez Lanier | Federico Laredo Brú | 1,5,10,20,50,100 | 19,028,000 notes (received 1938–42) |
| 1943 | Eduardo I. Montoulieu | Fulgencio Batista | 1,5,10,20,50,100 | 12,966,800 notes (received 1945) |
| 1944 | | | 500,1000 | ABNC issue |
| 1945 | Manuel Fernandez Supervielle | Ramón Grau | 1,5,10,20,100,500 (Note: The 500 peso note was engraved and printed by ABNC and is not included in the number of notes received.) | 13,230,400 notes (received 1945) |
| 1947 | | | 500,1000 | ABNC issue |
| 1948 | Isauro Valdes Moreno | Ramón Grau | 1,5,10,20,50,100 | 14,623,000 notes (received 1948) |
| 1949 | Antonio Prío Socarrás | Carlos Prío Socarrás | 1,5 | 6,940,000 notes (received 1949) |

=== Series 1934 ===
On 25 June 1934, Cuban Secretary of Communications Gabriel Landa replaced outgoing Treasury Secretary Saenz. Four months later (29 October 1934), Landa was replaced by Manuel Despaigne and became Secretary of National Defense. He resigned his cabinet position at the end of November, three weeks before an arrest warrant was issued (15 December 1934) charging him with embezzlement. (Note: According to the New York Times report, "it is problematical whether the charge can be pressed since the money alleged to have been misappropriated was taken from secret funds legally granted to the Secretary of the Treasury by a Presidential decree and for which no accounting was required.) The BEP received instructions from the Cuban government to replace the Landa signature with Despaigne which was put into effect in December 1934. A small number of one and five peso notes with Landa's signature had already been printed but were never issued. Original art and mock-ups for both versions (part of the National Numismatic Collection, NMAH) can be seen in the tables below.

Original art and progress proofs for BEP-issued Cuban silver certificates (Series 1934)
| Value | Art/progress proof (v1) | Art/progress proof (v2) | Certified proof |
|---|---|---|---|
| 1 peso | | | |
| 5 pesos | | | |
| 10 pesos | | | |
| 20 pesos | | | |
| 50 pesos | | | |

=== Series 1936 ===
Original progress proofs and certified proofs (Note: The bottom selvage of BEP certified proofs contain the date of the proof impression and the necessary approval signatures to begin production of the basic plate printing (prior to the addition of any overprints containing color tints or seals and serial numbers).) for Series 1936 Cuban silver certificates (Note: BEP certified proof dates for the Series 1936 notes (in ascending denominational order): 30 April 1936, 27 April 1936, 13 April 1936, 21 April 1936, 20 April 1936, and 9 April 1937.)
| Value | Art/Progress proofs | Certified proofs | Portrait (Note: There were no changes in portraits during the Silver certificate issue. The two ANBC-issued denominations of 500 and 1,000 pesos depicted Salvador Cisneros Betancourt and Tomás Estrada Palma respectively.) |
|---|---|---|---|
| 1 peso | | | José Martí; Engraved by William Ford |
| 5 pesos | | | Máximo Gómez; Engraved by William Ford |
| 10 pesos | | | Carlos Manuel de Céspedes; Engraved by Sydney Smith |
| 20 pesos | | | Antonio Maceo Grajales; Engraved by Elie Loizeaux |
| 50 pesos | | | Calixto García; Engraved by Leo Kauffmann |
| 100 pesos | | | Francisco Vicente Aguilera; Engraved by William Ford |

== See also ==
- Cuban peso
