= Juan de Lesca =

Spanish army general

The Most Excellent Juan de Lesca
- Born: Juan de Lesca y Fernández
- Military career
- Branch: Spanish Army
- Rank: Mariscal de Campo
- Unit: No. 16 Castilla Infantry Regiment
- Conflicts: Ten Years' War; Battle of the Sierra de Cubitas; Battle of Las Minas
- Awards: Order of Isabella the Catholic (March 6, 1860); Royal and Military Order of Saint Hermenegild (1870)

Juan de Lesca was a 19th-century Spanish military figure who was a Knight of the Grand Cross of the Order of Isabella the Catholic, fought in the Ten Years' War, and was later bestowed the Order of Saint Hermengild.

== Biography ==
Juan de Lesca y Fernández was born in Spain in the 19th century.

=== Spanish Army ===
By the mid-1840s he was the commander of the Third Battalion, No. 16 Castilla Infantry Regiment under Ramón Nouvilas in the Spanish Army of the Peninsula. The regiment fought Carlist and Republican bands originating from Galicia and Catalonia, including those under Ramón Cabrera.

As early as 1852 he was on the auxiliary staff of the Ministry of War and its departments. At that time, he also engaged in the business of producing or selling sieves. In 1853, Lesca held an official position within the Secretariat of the Ministry of War, responsible for the Spanish military and its overseas territories.

Juan de Lesca's infantry was assigned to the barracks in Lugo on July 13, 1856, where they were under the authority of Military Governor Juan de Teran y Amerigo.

Lesca was appointed as the military governor of Puerto Príncipe (now Camagüey Province) in Central Cuba on August 13, 1856. He held the position during the second term of José Gutiérrez de la Concha.

On November 19, 1857 he held the rank of Brigadier General of the infantry regiment in Biscay, a province in the Basque Country, northern Spain, and served as the military governor.

In late 1857 he continued his role as an official of the Ministry of War for Francisco Armero and within the secretariat and archival departments organized for the Military State of Spain and Overseas. In November 1858, he resigned from his position as First Officer and Acting Undersecretary of the Ministry of War. By November 19, Lesca was appointed to the position of Second Chief Officer of the Ministry of War, which became vacant due to the promotion of his predecessor Juan de Río y Sánchez de Anaya.

On March 6, 1860 he was made a Spanish Knight of the Grand Cross of the Order of Isabella the Catholic, along with Blas Villate.

Lesca held the position of military governor of Biscay in 1864.

=== Ten Years' War ===
When Cuba's Ten Years' War began in October 1868, he served under Captain General Francisco de Lersundi y Ormaechea. Following the Las Clavellinas uprising by Cuban separatists, he was assigned as the commanding general and military governor of Puerto Príncipe (present-day Camagüey).

The brigade led by Juan de Lesca comprised battalions from the King's and Aragon regiments, an engineering unit, and two artillery pieces.

==== Battle of the Sierra de Cubitas ====
An expedition was organized with four steamers and over 3500 Spanish troops led by Spanish Brigadier Juan de Lesca. After landing on La Guanaja beach on February 18, 1869, they set out towards Puerto Príncipe. By March 1869, he was ambushed by the mambises of Gen. Manuel de Quesada while marching through the Sierra de Cubitas. The mountain pass within the Camagüey region bears the name Lesca's Pass (Spanish: Paso de Lesca).

On April 17, 1869 a military convoy guarded by the combined Spanish forces of Lesca and two other military officers was attacked by Col. Francisco Muñoz Rubalcava of the Liberation Army.

==== Battle of Las Minas ====
On May 3, 1869 the Spanish column of Gen. Lesca clashed with the Camagüey division of Maj. Gen. Ignacio Agramonte outside of Las Minas at Altagracia in Camagüey Province. After Gen. Juan de Lesca assaulted a fortified position held by Quesada's Cuban Liberation Army, Cuban patriot Salvador Cisneros Betancourt provided crucial support to the defenders. The Cubans, wielding machetes and cane-knives, successfully repelled the Spanish forces of Lesca.

By May 13, 1869 Lesca was promoted to Mariscal de Campo and a Military Governor under Captain General Antonio Caballero y Fernández de Rodas. In the summer of 1869, Lesca assumed command in Villa Clara Province, bringing Basque volunteers and setting up headquarters in Santa Clara.

In 1870 he was bestowed the Order of Saint Hermengild.
