= Belisario Grave de Peralta =

Cuban army general (1841-1880)

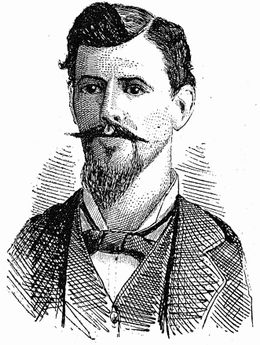
- Born: Belisario Grave de Peralta y Zayas; April 16, 1841; Holguín, Captaincy General of Cuba, Spanish Empire
- Died: September 27, 1880 (aged 39); Comayagüela, Honduras
- Military career
- Allegiance: Republic of Cuba
- Branch: Cuban Liberation Army
- Service years: 1868-1879
- Rank: Brigadier General
- Units: Second Division, Army of Oriente
- Commands: 3rd Brigade, Department of Holguín Province
- Conflicts: Ten Years' War; Little War

Belisario Grave de Peralta y Zayas (April 16, 1841 - September 27, 1880) was a Cuban army general during Cuba's Ten Years' War.

== Early life ==
Belisario Grave de Peralta y Zayas was born in Holguín, Spanish Cuba on April 16, 1841.

He was the younger brother of Julio Grave de Peralta and the uncle of the former mayor of Havana, Perfecto Lacoste.

== Ten Years' War ==
Shortly after the Cry of Yara in 1868, Belisario and his brother joined the Ten Years' War and rose up in arms in Holguín.

He was placed in the Cuban Liberation Army's Second Division under Maj. Gen. Thomas Jordan in April 1869. Serving in the 3rd Brigade led by his brother Gen. Julio, he operated in Holguín Province.

In 1872, his brother, Gen. Julio Grave de Peralta was killed.

Forces in the Holguín region were split into western and eastern factions, with Belisario commanding the western brigade adjacent to Las Tunas and linked to Gen. Vicente García.

The Mambí Brigadier orchestrated an assault on the Spanish camp of Yaraniquén in Holguín in January 1876, resulting in the capture and looting of the fort and settlement. Later, on February 1, 1876, he attacked the Las Cruces de Purnio camp in Holguín Province, acquiring arms, ammunition, livestock, and other resources.

Amid Gen. Arsenio Martinez Campos' Pact of Zanjón in 1878, certain Cuban leaders, such as Grave de Peralta, rejected the peace terms and persisted with their anti-colonial schemes. Peralta joined Antonio Maceo's cause with the resolve to continue the fight.

== Little War ==
On the banks of the Rio Rioja, close to Holguín, Belisario Grave de Peralta issued the call for independence on August 24, 1879. 200 men from Holguín and Gibara under Belisario rose in arms in the eastern province of Santiago de Cuba. This initiated the Little War which involved Cuban leaders such as Calixto García, José Maceo, Guillermo Moncada, and Emilio Núñez. Pursued by the persistent forces of Spanish Generals José de Valera and Camilo García de Polavieja, he was forced to present himself on December 21, 1879. Spanish Gen. Polavieja successfully negotiated for the surrender of Belisario Grave de Peralta's role in the movement.

== Death ==
Belisario Grave de Peralta died on September 27, 1880, in Comayagüela, Honduras.
