= Nicolás Castellanos =

Cuban politician (1911–1985)

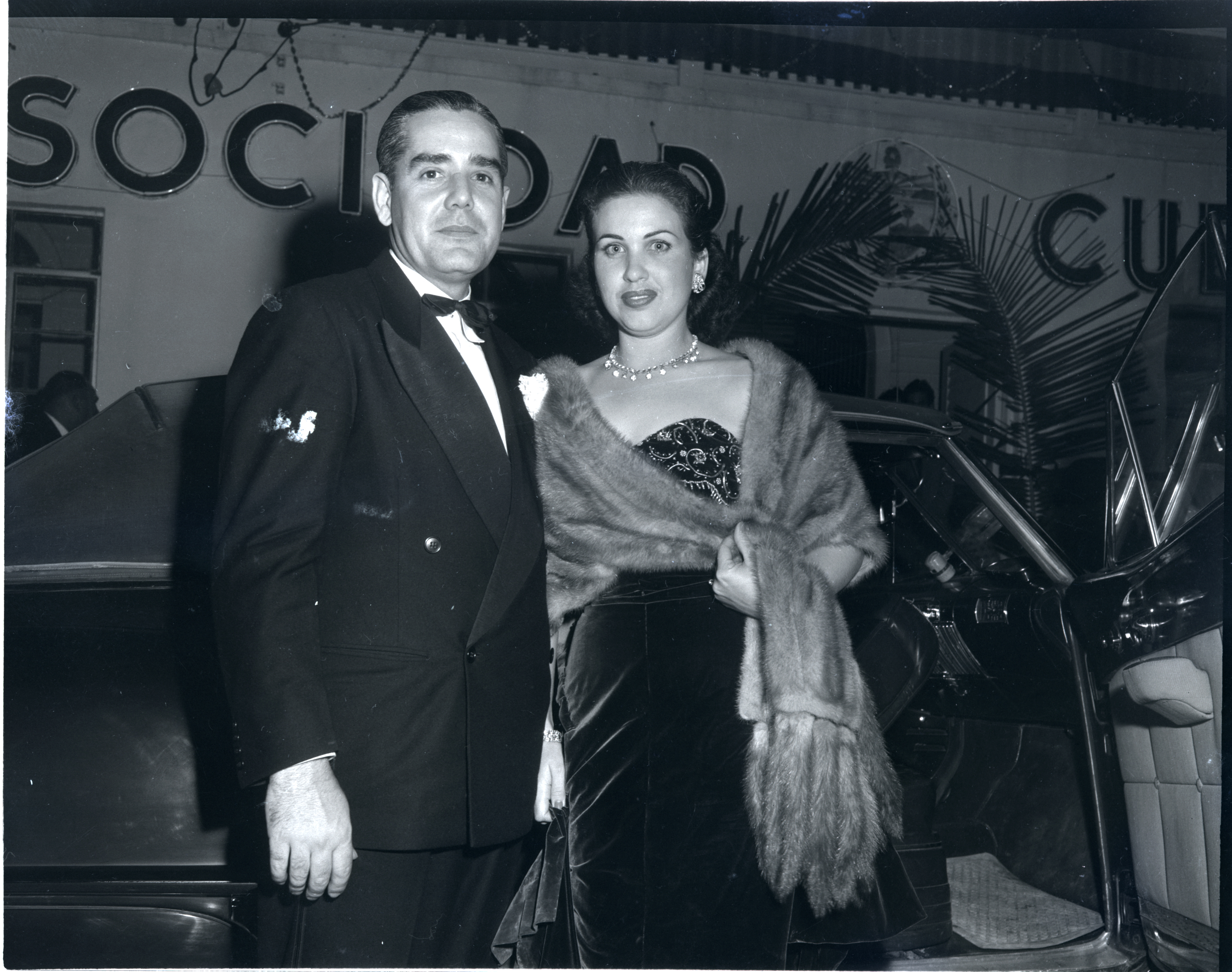
- Photograph of Castellanos and his wife, 1951

Mayor of Havana, Cuba
- In office 1947–1952
- Succeeded by: Manuel Fernández Supervielle

Personal details
- Born: Nicolás Dionisio Castellanos Rivero; 6 December 1911 Limonar, Cuba
- Died: 10 February 1985 (aged 73)
- Party: Partido Auténtico
- Spouse: Laudelina Castellanos

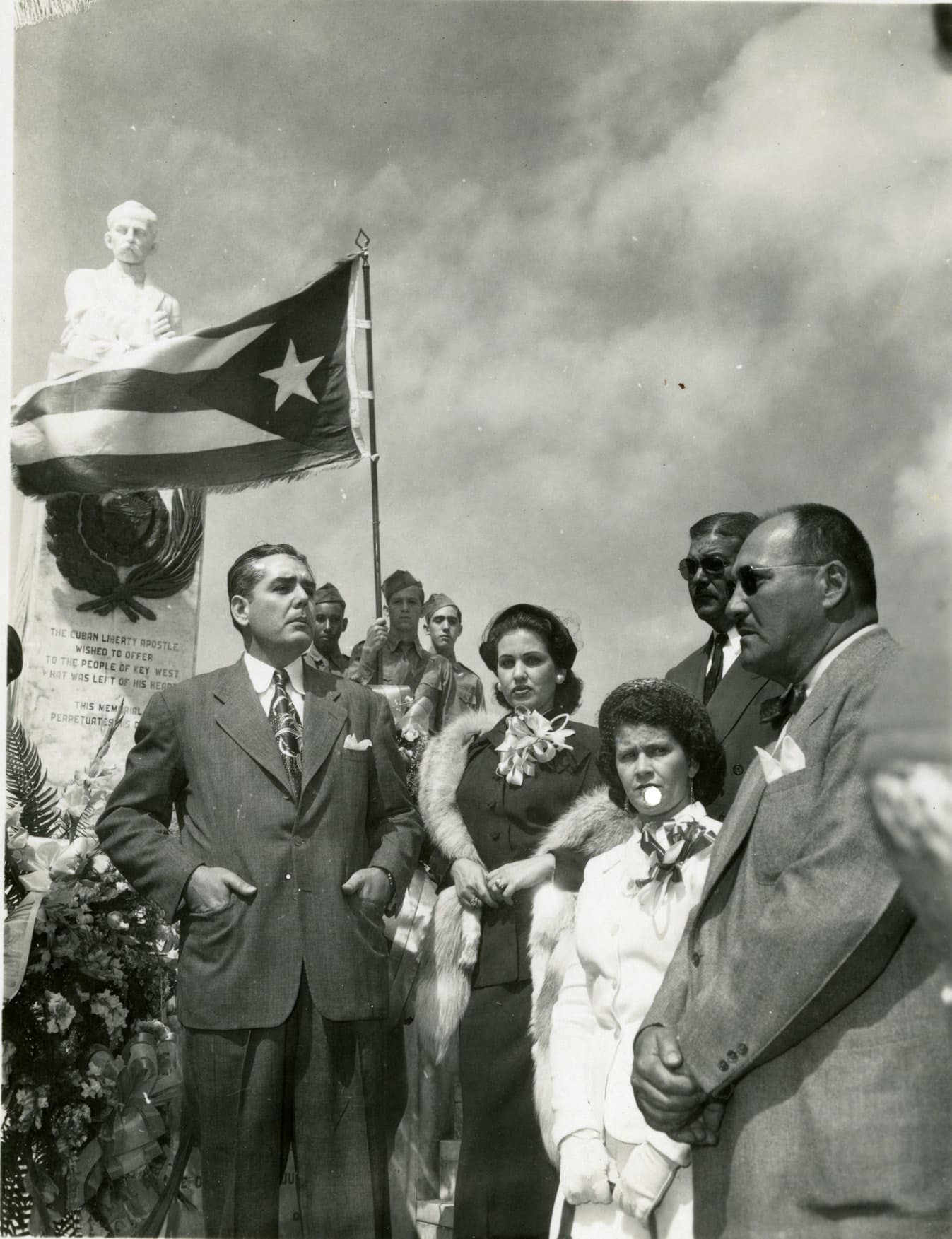
Nicolás Castellanos and wife, Laudelina Fernandez Castellanos, visiting Key West (Feb. 1951)

Nicolás Dionisio Castellanos Rivero (6 December 1911 in Limonar, Cuba – 10 February 1985) was a Cuban politician and mayor of Havana from 1947 to 1952. Castellanos was the president of the Havana City Council until succeeding Manuel Fernández Supervielle as mayor. He was a member of the Authentic Party when taking the mayoral position. He was married to Laudelina Fernández Castellanos and had three children. Castellanos and his family left Cuba after the Cuban Revolution.

== Mayor of Havana ==
Castellanos took office in 1947 after the mayor, Manuel Fernández Supervielle, committed suicide. When Castellanos took office Havana's main issue was a lack of water. Castellanos allocated 26 million pesos to complete the third expansion of Acueducto de Albear. He ran for a second term in 1950, using his accomplishments of solving Havana's water issues as the focus of his campaign, causing the election to be termed "The Bathtub Election". He won the nomination over his opponent, Antonio Prío Socarrás, with 171,828 votes to 119,555.

=== Visit to Key West ===
In 1951, then mayor, Castellanos, had an official visit to Key West, Florida with his wife Laudelina "Lila" Fernandez Castellanos. They arrived on February 24 and were greeted by C.B. Harvey, then mayor of Key West, and his wife Wilhelmina Harvey. This visit was important as Cuba and The United States faced political troubles, with Havana and Key West having only 93 miles of separation.
