= Pedro Esteban González-Larrinaga =

Former mayor of Havana

Don Pedro Esteban y González-Larrinaga, Marquis de Esteban

Mayor of Havana
- In office June 19, 1898 – January 1, 1899
- Preceded by: Miguel Diaz
- Succeeded by: Perfecto Lacoste
- Constituency: Captaincy General of Cuba

Personal details
- Born: Pedro Esteban y González-Larrinaga; 1850 Havana, Captaincy General of Cuba, Spanish Empire
- Died: Unknown

Pedro Esteban y González-Larrinaga, also known as Marquis de Esteban, was the last Spanish Mayor of Havana elected under Spanish rule.

== Early history ==
Pedro Esteban y González-Larrinaga was born in Havana, Spanish Cuba in 1850. His relatives were one of the old wealthy Spanish families in Cuba. He was bestowed the non-royal title of Marquis de Esteban, which translates as Marquis of Esteban based on his father's surname. His maternal grandfather was Don Ignacio González-Larrinaga y Benítez, an honorary intendant of the Navy.

On December 17, 1879, he graduated from the Universidad de la Habana and received his Bachelor of Laws.

By the 1890s, he was a large property owner.

== Politics ==
Pedro Esteban, who succeeded a conservative mayor, was appointed by Captain General Ramón Blanco rather than being chosen by popular vote. He was a member of the Autonomist Junta in Havana. Despite the papal title, he had no qualifications or experience in politics.

Marquis of Esteban took up his post on June 19, 1898, serving as the Mayor and president of the City Council of Havana.

In December 1898, he witnessed the ashes of Christopher Columbus being transferred from the Havana Cathedral to the Spanish cruiser Conde del Venadito.

At the time of the Spanish evacuation, the civil government surrendered. He held the position of municipal mayor of Havana until January 1899 when American military authorities appointed Cuban Perfecto Lacoste.
