= Julio Grave de Peralta =

Cuban army general (1834-1872)

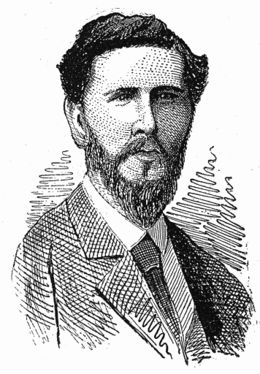
- Born: Julio Grave de Peralta y Zayas; April 24, 1834; Holguín, Captaincy General of Cuba, Spanish Empire
- Died: June 24, 1872 (aged 38); Guantánamo Province, Captaincy General of Cuba, Spanish Empire
- Military career
- Allegiance: Republic of Cuba
- Branch: Cuban Liberation Army
- Service years: 1868-1872
- Rank: General
- Units: Second Division, Army of Oriente
- Commands: 3rd Brigade, Department of Holguín Province
- Conflicts: Ten Years' War †

Julio Grave de Peralta y Zayas (April 24, 1834 - June 24, 1872) was a Cuban army general who was killed in combat during the Ten Years' War.

== Early life ==
Julio Grave de Peralta was born in Holguín, Cuba on April 24, 1834. His brother was Belisario Grave de Peralta. He was the uncle of the former Mayor of Havana, Perfecto Lacoste.

== Ten Years' War ==
Between October 17 to November 6, 1868, Holguín was besieged in a pro-independence uprising by forces led by Julio Grave de Peralta, shortly after the Ten Years' War began.

In April 1869, he was assigned to the Cuban Liberation Army's Second Division, Army of Oriente under Maj. Gen. Thomas Jordan. He served as the general in command of the 3rd Brigade, overseeing operations in the Department of Holguín Province.

=== Fannie Expedition ===
On June 6, 1872, an expedition led by Gen. Grave de Peralta and Col. William A.C. Ryan embarked from New York aboard the filibustering steamer known as the "Fannie". Following its departure from the United States for Cuba, the vessel became aground on a reef and ended up twelve miles northwest of Baracoa on June 22, 1872. The crew worked for thirty hours to get the Fannie off the reef, but as coal was being thrown overboard, the vessel caught fire and burned. As a result of the Fannie's grounding, the vessel landed its cargo of war material and 56 Cuban mambí fighters under the command of Grave De Peralta. Once the filibusters made landfall, they buried the vessel's arms and ammunition in the woods. Gen. Jose Valera, a high-ranking Spanish army officer, along with the forces under his command in that jurisdiction saw the burning vessel. In the initial engagement, the Spanish troops killed Grave de Peralta and captured five others. The prisoners led Valera to the buried cargo who subsequently seized the arms and ammunition as well as important correspondence for Carlos Manuel de Céspedes that was on the fallen general. Among the documents captured were some blank commissions and a number of proclamations signed by Grave de Peralta.

== Death ==
Julio Grave de Peralta died on June 24, 1872 in Guantánamo Province in Cuba.

Following his death, Gen. Julio Grave de Peralta was succeeded by Gen. Máximo Gómez in the Cuban Liberation Army.
