= Státní tiskárna cenin =

Czech state-owned banknote and secure document printing company

Státní tiskárna cenin, s.p.
- Type: State-owned enterprise
- Industry: Security printing
- Founded: 1953
- Founder: Ministry of Finance of the Czech Republic
- Headquarters: Růžová 943/6, 110 00 Prague 1, Prague, Czech Republic
- Key people: Tomáš Hebelka, MSc (CEO)
- Products: Banknotes; Security papers Government documents Identity documents Printed forms
- Revenue: 1,228,424,000 Czech koruna (2018)
- Operating income: 231,579,000 Czech koruna (2018)
- Net income: 192,477,000 Czech koruna (2018)
- Total assets: 2,002,404,000 Czech koruna (2018)
- Owner: Czech Republic
- Number of employees: 391 (2018)
- Website: www.stc.cz

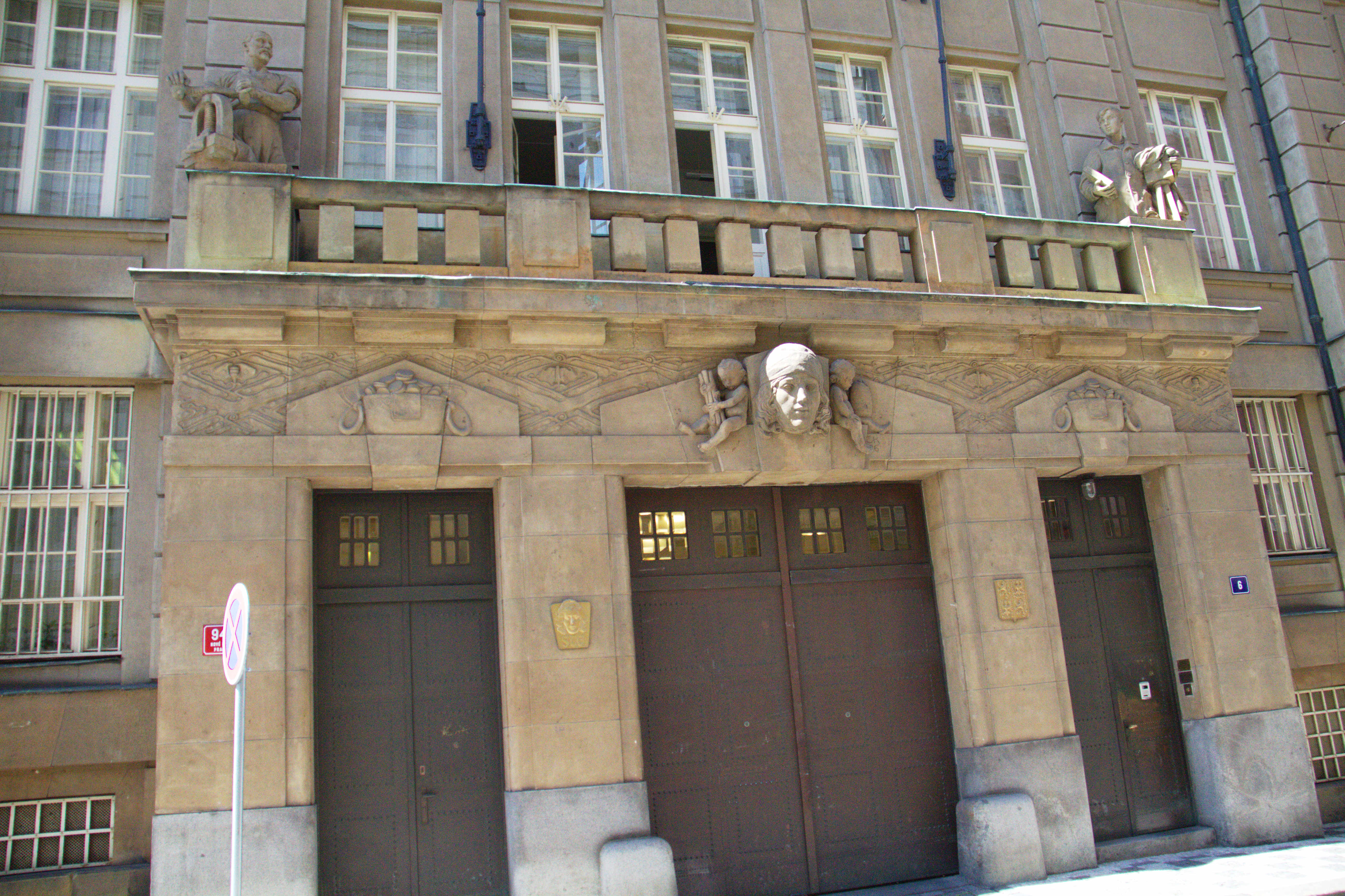
Entrance to the premises on Růžová Street in Prague (New Town)

Státní tiskárna cenin, s.p. (State Printing Works for Securities) is a state-owned enterprise providing printing and polygraphic services, specializing in banknotes and other items requiring secure features.

== Products ==
The company produces:

- Banknotes
- Identification documents — personal IDs, passports, driver's licenses, and other government-issued credentials.
- Securities — shares, government bonds, debentures, certificates, etc.
- Plastic cards — cards with contact/contactless chips and security features.
- Other security printed items, such as:
- Tax stamps (e.g., alcohol and tobacco excise stamps)
- Motorway vignette stickers
- Travel tickets
- Vouchers and certificates
- Meal vouchers, coupons
- Blank forms and other secure documents typically those with anti-forgery features

== History ==
The impetus for establishing a domestic security printing works arose with the creation of Czechoslovakia and the need to print new banknotes. The first banknotes printed within Czechoslovak territory were issued in denominations of 1, 5, 10, 20, 50, 100, and 500 koruna. Higher denominations of 1,000 and 5,000 koruna were printed abroad. As no specialized security printer existed in Czechoslovakia in 1919, printing was carried out in standard industrial printing houses.

Banknotes of 1, 5, and 50 koruna were printed at the printing works of Andreas Haase (cs; de) in Prague. The 10 koruna banknote was printed partly at the Otto & Růžička graphic studio in Pardubice and partly at Haase's printing works. Another printer involved was Národní politika in Prague, which produced the 100 koruna denomination and part of the 20 koruna issue. The remainder of the 20 koruna issue, along with the entire 500 koruna issue, was printed by the Czech Graphic Union in Prague.

To ensure comprehensive domestic production at the required technical level, it was decided to construct a new centralized banknote printing facility. Architect Josef Sakař (cs) designed the new printing works built between 1924 and 1927 and production began in January 1928. By the end of 1928, the printing works employed 133 workers.

In 1937, the printing works received an honorary diploma at the International Exhibition of Modern Decorative and Industrial Arts in Paris for the production of the 1,000 koruna banknote designed by Max Švabinský. After World War II, the printing works produced paper banknotes as well as other securities and identity documents for domestic use and for foreign customers. From 1 July 1950 until 30 June 1953, following the establishment of the State Bank of Czechoslovakia, the printing works functioned as a unit of the central bank. On 1 July 1953, an independent enterprise was established under the name Státní tiskárna cenin, assuming the responsibilities of the original printing works.

During the Cold War, STC undertook a number of foreign banknote contracts for Soviet-aligned governments. Among its most frequently cited international assignments was the production of Cuban peso banknotes for Cuba's August 1961 monetary reform following the Cuban Revolution. These replaced existing banknotes in a rapid demonetization, surveilling accumulated wealth and effectively expropriating any significant amounts of cash held outside the now-nationalized banks.

In 1989, the printing works underwent modernization, primarily in connection with the production of new banknotes. In the same year, the 20 koruna banknote featuring John Amos Comenius was selected as Banknote of the Year.

The first banknotes printed by Státní tiskárna cenin after the dissolution of Czechoslovakia were the 200, 1,000, and 5,000 koruna denominations. Banknotes of 50, 100, and 500 koruna were printed by De La Rue in London.

Today, Státní tiskárna cenin continues to operate as a specialized company, with approximately 95% of its production dedicated to security printing for the Czech National Bank.

In 2008, the redesigned 1,000 koruna banknote featuring new security elements was awarded second place in the Banknote of the Year competition by the International Association of Currency Affairs. First place was awarded to the Central Bank of Venezuela for its new banknote series.

== Controversies ==
In 2008, the Office for Personal Data Protection (Czech Republic) fined STC CZK 100,000 for violations of data protection law. The violation concerned a surveillance system that monitored employees within the building beyond working hours. STC management rejected the findings of the inspection.

In November 2013, Minister of Finance Jan Fischer summoned long-serving CEO Richard Bulíček. He was suspected of a conflict of interest after accepting paintings worth tens of thousands of Czech koruna as Christmas gifts on two occasions. The gifts were given by entrepreneur Jan Janků of the paper manufacturer Neograph, who was charged with manipulating a public procurement contract for Prague Integrated Transport. Fischer ordered Bulíček to return the gifts.

After media revelations in 2014 that the printing works had distributed ten-gram gold bars as gifts to politicians, civil servants, and business figures, Bulíček was dismissed by then-Minister of Finance Andrej Babiš (ANO 2011). Following his dismissal, STC was temporarily led by deputy CEO Olga Dudková.

The Ministry of Finance subsequently filed a criminal complaint, which police initially dismissed in September 2014. The ministry appealed successfully. Between 2009 and 2014, STC spent CZK 14 million on gold and silver gifts for influential individuals.

New CEO Pavel Novák subsequently commissioned audits at STC and filed criminal complaints concerning disadvantageous contracts concluded by previous management, alleging misuse of exemptions from public procurement law.

== Management ==
=== Chief executive officers ===
- Tomáš Hebelka (2016–present)
- Pavel Novák (2014–2016)
- Richard Bulíček (1991–2014)

=== Supervisory Board ===
As of October 2024:

- Václav Pirkl (chair)
- Soňa Snopková (Vice Chair)
- Jakub Čermák
- Věra Hnátová
- Petr Fikar
