= Perfecto Lacoste =

Former mayor of Havana (1861-1905)

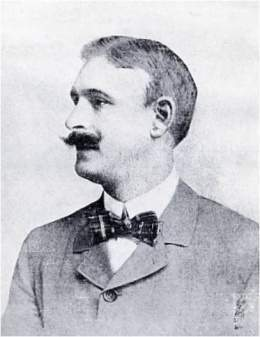

Mayor of Havana
- In office January 14, 1899 – July 1, 1900
- Preceded by: Pedro Esteban y González-Larrinaga, Marquis de Esteban
- Succeeded by: Alejandro Rodríguez y Velazco
- Constituency: Republic of Cuba

Cuban Secretary of Agriculture, Commerce and Industry
- In office May 1, 1900 – 1902
- Preceded by: Juan Ríus Rivera
- Succeeded by: Manuel Luciano Díaz
- Constituency: Republic of Cuba

Personal details
- Born: Perfecto Lacoste y Grave de Peralta; June 1861 Holguín, Captaincy General of Cuba, Spanish Empire
- Died: May 5 1905 Havana, Cuba
- Spouse: Lucía Lacoste

Perfecto Lacoste was the first Mayor of Havana elected under American occupation and later Secretary of Agriculture of Cuba.

== Early history ==
Perfecto Lacoste y Grave de Peralta was born in Holguín, Cuba in June 1861. His uncle was Cuban General Julio Grave de Peralta. The Ten Years' War caused his family to flee Cuba when he was 13 years old.

He attended university in the United States, went into business in Cincinnati, and later obtained American citizenship. He married his cousin, Lucía Lacoste.

Preceding the Spanish-American War, he returned to Cuba. Lacoste became a well-known planter, establishing the Lacoste sugar plantations in Pinar del Río Province. During the war, damages were sustained on his sugar plantation through the acts of both insurgent and Spanish forces. Forces of Máximo Gómez and Antonio Maceo encamped on the plantation on January 6, 1896.

== Politics ==
=== Mayor ===
At the time of Spanish evacuation, he was appointed by American military authorities, succeeding Pedro Esteban González-Larrinaga, Marquis de Esteban. Lacoste took up his post on January 1, 1899, serving as the Mayor of the City of Havana.

=== Secretary of Agriculture ===
When the Cuban Secretary of Agriculture Juan Ríus Rivera resigned on May 1, 1900, Lacoste assumed the position. Lacoste was appointed the Secretary of the Department of Agriculture, Commerce, and Industry by Military Governor of Cuba Leonard Wood and resigned as Mayor of Havana.

Following the 1901 Cuban general election, he was replaced by Manuel Luciano Díaz under the Palma government.

In 1902, he released a report titled Opportunities in Cuba, published by Lewis, Scribner, & Co.

Cuban sugar producers, led by Lacoste, influenced the Bliss-Palma protocol's sugar tariff provisions in the proposed 1903 treaty with the U.S.

== Ventures ==
A new sugar firm was founded by Lacoste in New York in 1904 with the goal of transforming his San José plantation into a large central sugar factory.

== Death ==
Perfecto Lacoste died in Havana, Cuba on May 5, 1905.
