= Manuel Fernández Supervielle =

Cuban politician and attorney (1894-1947)

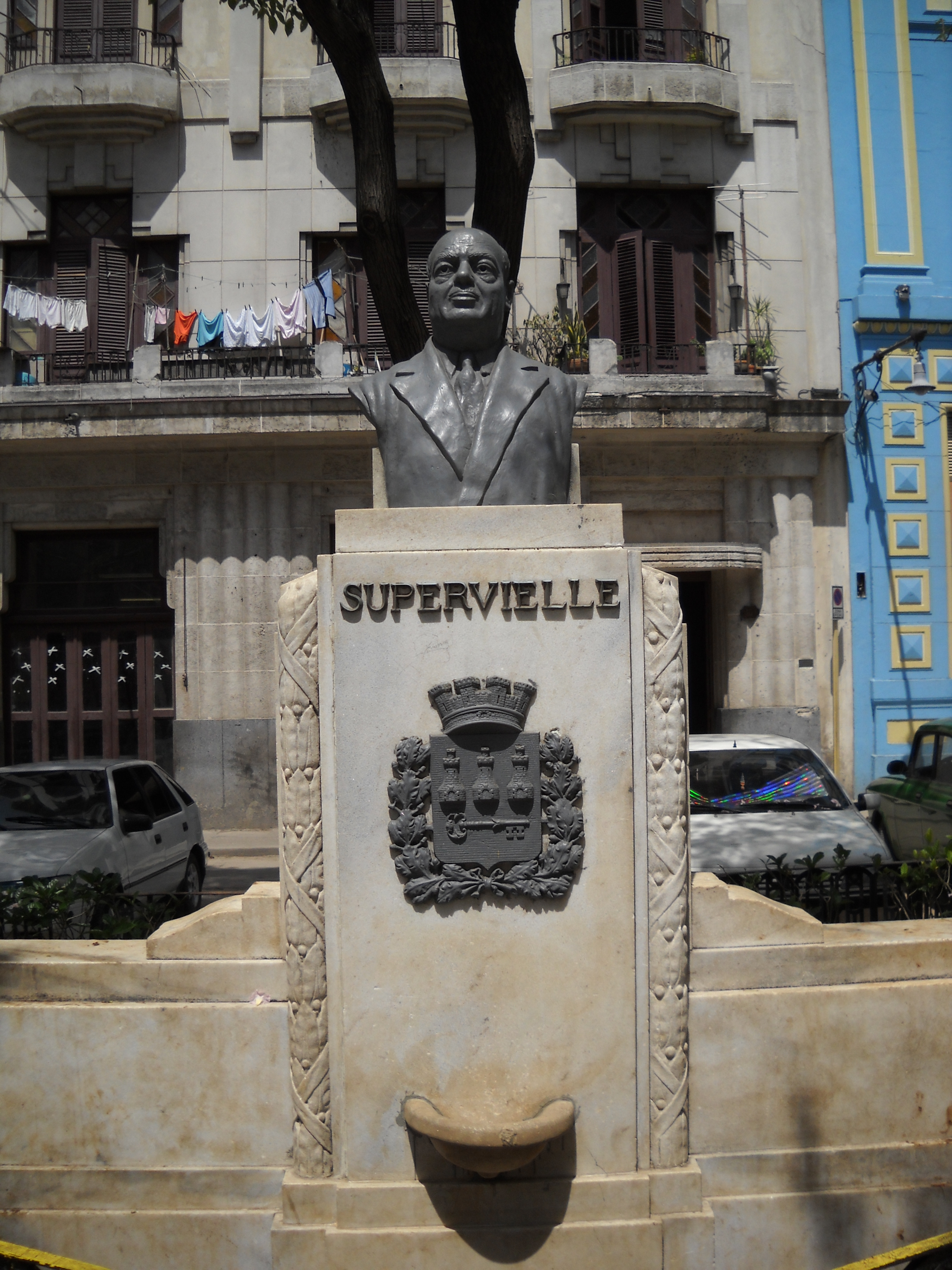

Manuel Fernández Supervielle (23 September 1894 – May 5, 1947, Miramar, Havana, Cuba) was a Cuban politician and attorney. He obtained his law degree from the University of Havana.

He was a member of the Cuban House of Representatives as member of the Partido Demócrata Republicano. He later left the party and joined the Partido Revolucionario Cubano (Auténtico). Supervielle was the Secretary of the Treasury of Cuba during the government of Ramón Grau San Martín (1944–1946). He later became the Mayor of Havana in September 1946. He had promised to build a new aqueduct for the city, but was unable to fulfill his promise. So on May 5, 1947, he shot himself in the chest with a revolver and died. The U.S. Embassy in Havana reported: "Great weight public opinion, as openly expressed, blames Grau and administration for death, holding that honest honorable official was hampered in fulfillment waterworks campaign promises by venality of politicians and preferred death to dishonor." He was succeeded by the President of the Havana City Council, Nicolás Castellanos.

He was married to Aurelia Palacios and had a son from his first marriage, Alfredo Fernández Supervielle y Domínguez (16 May 1922 – 4 February 2008), who remained in Cuba until the communist takeover. Thereafter, he immigrated to the United States, earned his PhD at Florida State University and taught.

== References and external links ==
- Time magazine; Vote of Confidence, June 10, 1946
- web.gc.cuny.edu/bildnercenter/publications/documents/Ehrlich26_000.pdf
- Diario las Americas; Falleció Alfredo Fernández Supervielle, February 8, 2008.
- "Palabra Nueva.net". Archived from the original on 2011-04-27.
