= Francisco Carrillo Morales =

6th Vice President of Cuba (1851–1926)

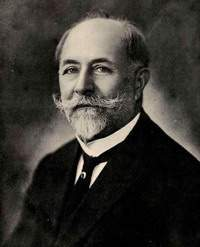

6th Vice President of Cuba
- In office May 20, 1921 – May 20, 1925
- President: Alfredo Zayas y Alfonso
- Preceded by: Emilio Núñez
- Succeeded by: Carlos de la Rosa Hernández

Personal details
- Born: October 4, 1851 Remedios, Santa Clara, Cuba, Spain,
- Died: November 11, 1926 (aged 75) Havana, La Habana, Cuba

Military service
- Allegiance: Cuba
- Branch: Cuban Liberation Army
- Years of service: 1869–1880; 1895–1926
- Rank: Major General
- Commands: 4th Army Corps
- Battles/wars: Ten Years' War: Battle of Jimaguayú; Battle of La Sacra; Battle of Palo Seco; Battle of Las Guásimas; Battle of Nuevas de Jobosí (WIA); Little War; Cuban War of Independence: Battle of Paso de las Damas (WIA); La Reforma Campaign

Francisco Carrillo Morales (1851–1926) was a Cuban politician and general who participated in all three wars of Cuban Independence. He commanded the 4th Army Corps during the Cuban War of Independence as a Major General. He was the sixth Vice President of Cuba, serving from May 20, 1921, to May 20, 1925, as well as a governor of several Cuban provinces.

== Origin ==
Francisco Carrillo Morales was born at the town of San Juan de los Remedios, Santa Clara on October 4, 1851. At just 17 years old, he became involved in the independence conspiracies that sought to separate Cuba from Spain.

== Ten Years' War ==
Carrillo took part in the Las Villas uprising in February 1869. He was subordinated to the Venezuelan Major General Salomé Hernández. Later, he went to Camagüey, along with the rest of the Villarreal soldiers in search of reorganizing and obtaining supplies.

He was an outstanding student at the military academy created by Major General Ignacio Agramonte in Camagüey. After Agramonte's death in May 1873, all his troops were subordinated to Major General Máximo Gómez.

Under Gómez's orders, Carrillo fought in Santa Cruz del Sur, the second combat of the Battle of Jimaguayú and the battles of La Sacra, Palo Seco and Las Guásimas, between 1873 and 1874. Back at Las Villas, Commander Francisco Carrillo was subordinated to Lieutenant Colonel Francisco Jiménez Cortés.

At Las Villas, Carrillo besieged and attacked Fort Tetuán near Remedios. He participated in the combats of Corojal, Hondones and Las Chacas, as well as in the attacks on Sancti Spíritus and Remedios. He was wounded in the Battle of Nuevas de Jobosí and was promoted to Colonel on October 1, 1877.

On February 10, 1878, the Pact of Zanjón was signed, which officially ended the war. Colonel Carrillo capitulated together with Major General Carlos Roloff on March 18 of that year.

== Little War ==
Being one of the main organizers of the Little War in the province of Santa Clara, he took up arms in his hometown on November 9, 1879. He had a personal duel with Hermann Brandeyrs, a Prussian officer in the service of Spain.

His main battles during this war were those of Ingenio Viejo, Caraballo, Itabo, Juan de Vera, Pesquero and Sábanas Nuevas de Jobosí. He capitulated with the rank of Brigadier General on September 30, 1880.

Between 1880 and 1892, he lived in the United States, where he cooperated with the other Cuban independence fighters, including José Martí. In 1892, he returned to Cuba to begin preparations for the Cuban War of Independence.

== Cuban War of Independence ==
On January 29, 1895, José Martí signed the order in New York City for General Carrillo to rise up in his region of origin. 4 The Cuban War of Independence began on February 24, 1895, but General Carrillo could not rise up as agreed, as he was arrested by the Spanish authorities. He remained a prisoner in La Cabaña Fortress in Havana Carrillo but he was released due to pressure from the U.S. government.

Deported to the United States, Carrillo managed to return to Cuba on the Horsa on November 17, 1895. After landing, he went to Camagüey and placed himself under the orders of the government of the Republic of Cuba in Arms. On March 27, 1896, General in Chief Máximo Gómez named him Chief of the Fourth Corps of Las Villas.

As head of said body, Carrillo assisted the expeditionaries on the fourth voyage of the Dauntless steamer. In October 1896, he participated in the Battle of Paso de las Damas, in November 1896 where Major General Serafín Sánchez died and Carrillo himself was wounded in the face.

He commanded at several battles throughout the year 1897 as part of the La Reforma Campaign. On April 29, 1898, General-in-Chief Máximo Gómez sent him to Key West to coordinate with the American high command the entry of the United States into the war. He returned to Cuba in May and ended the war in August with the rank of Major General.

== Political career ==
He was a senator for the Santa Clara Province from 1902 to 1910 and from 1913 to 1918. Notably, he was Vice President of Cuba from May 20, 1921, to May 20, 1925, under the presidency of Alfredo Zayas y Alfonso.

Major General Francisco Carrillo Morales died of natural causes in Havana on November 11, 1926. He was 75 years old when he died.
