= Enrique Loynaz del Castillo =

Cuban general and politician (1871–1963)

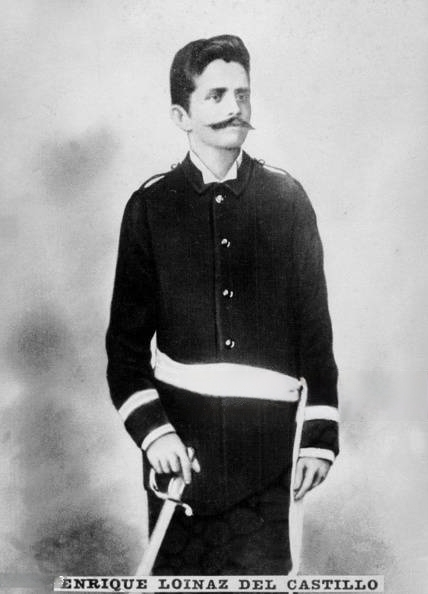
- Loynaz del Castillo in 1920
- Born: June 5, 1871; Puerto Plata, Puerto Plata Province, Dominican Republic
- Died: February 10, 1963 (aged 91); Havana, La Habana Province, Cuba
- Spouse: María de las Mercedes Muñoz Sañudo
- Children: 4 (including Dulce María Loynaz)
- Military career
- Allegiance: Cuba; Dominican Republic
- Branch: Cuban Liberation Army; Dominican Army
- Service years: 1885–1947
- Rank: Brigadier General (Cuba); General (Dominican Republic)
- Conflicts: Cuban War of Independence: Battle of Mal Tiempo; Battle of Paso de las Damas

Enrique Loynaz del Castillo (June 5, 1871 – February 10, 1963) was a Dominican-born Cuban general and independence activist of the late 19th century and early 20th century. He was known for his service in the Cuban War of Independence, participating in the battles of Mal Tiempo and Paso de las Damas.

== Origin ==
Enrique was born on June 5, 1871, at Puerto Plata, Dominican Republic. His parents, Enrique Loynaz y Arteaga and Juana del Castillo y Bethancourt were Cubans which resided at the revolutionary delegation at the city. He would be educated and would graduate with a bachelor's degree in science and writing, going on to later become a professor. His father was a veteran of the Ten Years' War, notably being the Captain of the schooner Galvanic.

== Interwar Period ==
In 1885, Loynaz participated in an expedition to Cuba with generals Serafín Sánchez and Francisco Carrillo Morales where he would meet and come to know Máximo Gómez. In 1892, he met with José Martí at New York City and partook in the collaboration of for the Cuban independence movement and became an adamant activist. Fundó en 1893 the pro-independence weekly "El Guajiro" which would get him fined and arrested on various occasions. Around the same time, he would play a role in the foundations of the tram system at Camagüey. On March 19, 1894, Martí gave him an armament that he shipped inside the company's cars. Loynaz would later be caught and managed to escape through the mountains of Saint Lucia, embarking for New York City aboard the Amrun. In 1895, he became a commander of the 1st Las Villas Division under general Serafín Sánchez. He also came to represent the Constituent Assembly of Jimuaguayú.

Enrique Loynaz del Castillo would reach the rank of Brigadier General for merits in war before he was discharged. During the Republic, he became a plenipotentiary minister at Mexico, commissioner general during the Expedition of San Francisco and a minister at Portugal, Panama, Central America, the Dominican Republic, Haiti and Venezuela. Martí decided to send him to Costa Rica, where he was secretary to Major General Antonio Maceo Grajales, whom he saved his life after a duel with Cuban-Italian Colonel Orestes Ferrara which left him severely wounded at the exit of a theater in San José on November 10, 1894. Loynaz del Castillo reportedly shouted Lo que ningún español era capaz de hacer en el combate a mí esta maldita italiana lo hizo., (What no Spaniard was able to do in combat to me this damned Italian did it.) In January 1895, he participated in the organization of the Fernandina Plan.

== Cuban War of Independence ==
He entered the ranks of the Cuban Liberation Army on July 24, 1895, as a member of the expedition of the steamer James Woodall, which landed in Tayabacoa, on the south coast of Las Villas, under the command of Major General Carlos Roloff. He was assigned to the position of chief of staff of Major General Serafín Sánchez, head of the first division of the fourth corps of Las Villas, with whom he participated in the actions of Taguasco and Los Pasitos. On September 3, 1895, Loynaz was elected as representative for Camagüey to the Constituent Assembly of Jimaguayú where he drafted the declaration of independence contained in the Constitution approved there. He joined the invading column with the position of aide-de-camp to Antonio Maceo. He also composed the Himno Invasor on November 15, 1895. He participated in every battle around the earlier phases of the revolution, standing out in the battles of La Reforma, Boca del Toro, El Quirro, Mal Tiempo, Santa Isabel, La Colmena, Coliseo, La Entrada, Calimete and El Estante. In January 1896, he was appointed chief of staff of the fourth corps, continuing under the leadership of Serafín. He fought at Manajanabo, Dos Caminos, El Faro, Cascorro, El Marino and Manaquitas.

On August 31, 1896, he presented a plan to the governing council to lead an armed expedition to Puerto Rico. Considering that the conditions were adverse to the probable success of such an enterprise, the governing council rejected it on September 14, 1896. He stood out in the Battle of Paso de las Damas on November 18, 1896, where he charged against the Spaniards to rescue the lifeless body of Sánchez, after whose death he was temporarily in charge of the general inspection of the Liberation Army. On January 1, 1897, he was appointed second chief of the infantry of the expeditionary regiment, which operated in the Matanzas Province, subordinate to Division General Avelino Rosas, head of the first division of the fifth corps. A month later he was appointed chief of staff to Major General José María Rodríguez, head of the Western Department.

On June 24, 1897, he was appointed to replace Major General Quintín Bandera with a view to which he reorganized the expeditionary contingent that was in Villareño territory, composed mainly of residents of the Oriente Province. In August 1897 he again offered to invade Puerto Rico in conjunction with then-Brigadier General José Lacret Morlot. In that year he fought the battles of Santa Teresa, Limones, Mercón, Quemados Grandes, Mabujina, Miranda, El Relámpago, Las Pozas, Valderrama, Punta del Hato, Ciénaga de Manjuarí, Río Voladora, Gϋinía de Miranda and La Jíquima, among others. On April 1, 1898, he rejoined his post as chief of staff of the Western Department, where the war ended. He took part in more than 60 combative actions.

== Later career ==
At some point during the early 20th century, he would marry Doña María de las Mercedes Muñoz Sañudo and have two sons, Enrique and Carlos Manuel, and two daughters, Flor and Dulce Maria.

He was secretary of the police force, under the orders of Major General Mario García Menocal (1899-1902). He served as a representative to the chamber for Camagüey, from 1902 to 1906. In the uprising against the re-election of President Tomás Estrada Palma, he was one of the main figures against re-election. Arrested on August 19, 1906, he managed to escape and assume command of the rebel forces in the provinces of La Habana and Matanzas. He led the battles at Babiney-Colorado on September 5, 1906, and El Wajay on September 14, 1906, where he was wounded by a machete to the head. Two days later, on the 16th, he was officially proclaimed with the rank of Major General by the rebel forces.

He served as Cuba's ambassador to Mexico from 1908 to 1911. He participated in the uprising of the Liberals against the re-election of President Mario García Menocal in February 1917. In 1928 he was the ambassador to Portugal, the Dominican Republic and Haiti. On his return to Cuba he fought the dictatorship of Gerardo Machado. He participated in the uprising of the Havana police force on August 12, 1933. Reincorporated into the diplomatic service, he was ambassador to Panama and Venezuela. In the final years of his life, he worked as an advisor to the Ministry of State from where he was public opposed to the regime of Dominican dictator Rafael Trujillo. He later wrote the work Memorias de la Guerra. He retired from active life in 1947.

He died in Havana on February 10, 1963, at the age of 91.

== Dates of rank ==
| Insignia | Rank | Date | Component |
|---|---|---|---|
| | Lieutenant Colonel | October 10, 1895 | Cuban Liberation Army |
| | Colonel | February 6, 1896 | Cuban Liberation Army |
| | Brigadier General | July 10, 1897 | Cuban Liberation Army |
| | General | December 1899 | Dominican Army |
