= Battle of Paso de las Damas =

1896 battle of the Cuban War of Independence

- Part of Cuban War of Independence
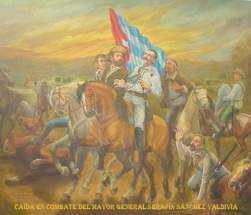
- The death of Serafín Sánchez
Date	18 November 1896
Location	Santa Clara Province, Cuba
Result	Spanish victory

Belligerents
Cuban rebels	Spain

Commanders and leaders
Serafín Sánchez †; Francisco Carrillo (WIA); Avelino Rosas; Enrique Loynaz (WIA)	Manuel Armiñán; López de Amor

Strength
800 infantry	2,500 infantry with artillery

Casualties and losses
8 killed and 19 wounded	30 killed and 83 wounded

The Battle of Paso de las Damas was a battle of the Cuban War of Independence that took place on 18 November 1896 at the Santa Clara Province.

== Background ==
Cuban Major General Serafín Sánchez, had previously participated in the Ten Years' War and the Little War for the independence of Cuba. The Cuban War of Independence was the continuation of the previous two wars and General Sánchez immediately joined the mambises. Towards the last months of 1896, the Cuban independence forces were waging the Las Villas Campaign in mid-November of that year.

== The battle ==
The combat was meticulously prepared by General Sánchez in a field chosen by him. The regiments under his command, made up of approximately 800 men, attacked the enemy in the afternoon. The Spanish forces had been defeated the day before by the same Cuban forces. Now they brought 2,500 soldiers well-armed and equipped with various pieces of artillery. They were led by Generals Armiñán and López de Amor.

During the battle, Major General Francisco Carrillo suffered a severe contusion to his face and the then Lieutenant Colonel Enrique Loynaz del Castillo was knocked off his horse, which collapsed on top of him, causing injuries. Given the lack of ammunition and the Spanish push, the Cuban troops withdrew in an orderly fashion. At that moment, an enemy bullet went through Serafín Sánchez's body, from the right shoulder to the left. His last words were: "They have killed me, that is nothing! Keep going!"

While the rear guard detained the enemy, the Cubans transported the body of General Sánchez to a safe place. The general died at 5:15 on 18 November 1896. He was buried the next day.

== Aftermath ==
With this battle, the Mambí Army lost an important and experienced general, who, together with the previous deaths of Guillermón Moncada, Flor Crombet, José Martí and José Maceo, was added to the list of Cuban generals killed in this war, significantly affecting the military capacity of the Cubans.
