= Battle of Iguará =

1895 battle of the Cuban War of Independence

- Part of Cuban War of Independence and Invasion from East to West in Cuba
Date	December 13, 1895
Location	Iguará, Santa Clara Province, Cuba
Result	Cuban victory

Belligerents
Cuban rebels	Spain

Commanders and leaders
Máximo Gómez; Antonio Maceo	Colonel Segura

Casualties and losses
30 killed	18 killed

The Battle of Iguará was a battle of the Cuban War of Independence which took place on December 13, 1895, in the Santa Clara Province, Cuba.

== The Battle ==
That same day, near the town of Iguará, the Invasive Column, under the command of Major Generals Máximo Gómez and Antonio Maceo, faced a Spanish column, under the command of Colonel Segura.

The invaders forded the Jatibonico River to enter Las Villas and when only half had crossed the river, they detected the Spanish troops. Gómez occupied a near height to beat the advancing opponent. For his part, Maceo went to the river in order to prevent the column from splitting into two parts.

When the Spanish troops saw the Cubans, they opened heavy fire on them. They organized in two oblique lines and at the same time, attacked the forces of both Mambi generals.

Maceo decided to charge his cavalry and despite the intense fire, it didn't prevent the annihilation of several sections of the Spanish troops, whose forces were disorganized. Gómez attacked from the other flank and the Mambisa rear, which had just finished fording the river, also charged, which put an end to the resistance of the Spaniards, who undertook the withdrawal.

The Cubans collected abandoned weapons and equipment and attacked again. After two hours of action, Gómez and Maceo put an end to the fight. Both forces suffered heavy losses: The Cubans lost 30 horsemen, including Lieutenant Colonel Enrique Céspedes, and the Spanish left 18 of their own lying on the battlefield. The Cubans captured 54 rifles and several mules loaded with various means.

== Aftermath ==
The victory of the battle resulted in the imminent advance of the Cuban forces in the invasion, as well as the achievement of important military victories, the incorporation of a large number of combatants into the Mambi ranks and the obtaining of new weapons and ammunition.
