= Battle of Mal Tiempo =

- Part of Cuban War of Independence and Invasion from East to West in Cuba
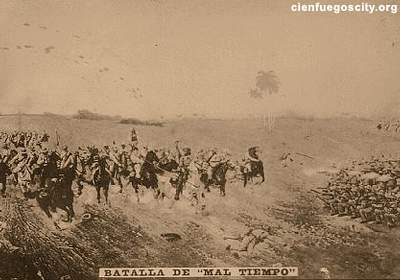
- Máximo Gómez's cavalry charge during the battle
Date	December 15, 1895
Location	Cruces, Cienfuegos Province, Cuba
Result	Cuban victory

Belligerents
Cuban rebels	Spain

Commanders and leaders
Máximo Gómez; Antonio Maceo; Serafín Sánchez	Salvador Arizón y Sánchez Fano; Manuel Sanz; Narciso Rich

Strength
450 Cavalry	2,500 Infantry

Casualties and losses
4 killed, 4 injured	300 killed and wounded

The Battle of Mal Tiempo was a battle of the Cuban War of Independence that took place on December 15, 1895, a few kilometers away from Cruces, Cienfuegos Province. In the battle, Mambises and Spanish forces faced each other, the former being victorious. This victory was considered one of the most important of the Invasion from East to West in Cuba, due to the political, military and economic consequences in favor of the independence activists.

== Background ==
The battle would be classified as one of the most illustrious events in the struggles for Cuban independence. It was led by Generalissimo Máximo Gómez and his Lieutenant General Antonio Maceo, who led a troop of Cuban patriots who carried out events that ennobled the country's history in decisive battles for the prestige of the armed insurrection. In his march from the East, Arsenio Martínez Campos, a key figure within the Spanish colonial system on the island, understood that the advance of the Liberation Army was imminent and in a desperate attempt to stop the insurrectionary thrust, he concentrated a large number of troops in the Cruces area.

== The battle ==
The Mal Tiempo area was the setting that allowed Cubans to demonstrate the patriotism that fueled them. The Mambi insurgents also had the topography of the land, "a gift of nature to make victory more perfect." The tactical intelligence of the Generalissimo, Máximo Gómez, and the bravery of his men, provided the rest for the success of the contest. Maceo was at the forefront of the cavalry, and Gómez attacked shouting: To combat, long live free Cuba! and as soon as he said that, fighting broke out.

Eugenio Sánchez Agramonte, who was present during the battle reportedly said:

250 riders set off like lightning with their machetes held high, their reins semi-loosed, held by the left hand, which at the same time was holding onto the manes, following the undefeated General like a whirlwind. Gómez, who, nailed and stiff on his mount, looked more like a centaur than a human being ...

José Miró Argenter who was another witness during the battle noted that

Still steadfast, the Spanish infantry, kneeling on the ground, resisted with a deadly fire and the tips of the bayonets, so that no one would pass. At the cry of "Let's go, Orientals, charge with machetes, long live Maceo!", the Orientals open a breach and stab without mercy for fifteen minutes.

He followed that up with:

The drama did not last any longer. Two complete sections have fallen here with their officers who commanded them, furthermore, groups of infantrymen and horsemen mixed in confusion, roll on the edge of the Cuban saber.

Enrique Loynaz del Castillo who was a participant, highlighted that:

The Mal Tiempo journey indirectly decided the fate of the war. The final result did not immediately follow, but it cleared the way, multiplied the force and spirit of the Invasion and proved once again the ability of the Spanish soldier, much better armed as he was, and more disciplined to defeat troops with no anticipated combat experience in the open field.

== Aftermath ==
During the battle, the Liberation Army caused around 300 casualties to the Spanish army. The independence forces only reported four deaths and the same number of wounded. The accurate military strategy of Generalissimo Gómez and the bravery and combative disposition of his soldiers were tested.

Many Cubans linked to the sugar industry, inspired by the triumph of Mal Tiempo, suspended the work of preparing the harvest and dismantled the machines of the sugar mills. The Cubans also sieged equipment from the Spanish such as weapons, ammunition, mules and horses. This fact constituted a severe economic blow for the Spanish colonialists of the region. In days after December 15, the Spanish Army suffered another series of defeats caused by the Creole insurgents, although the battle of Mal Tiempo was essential for the advance of the invasion towards the West of the island of Cuba.
