= José Miró Argenter =

Cuban general and author

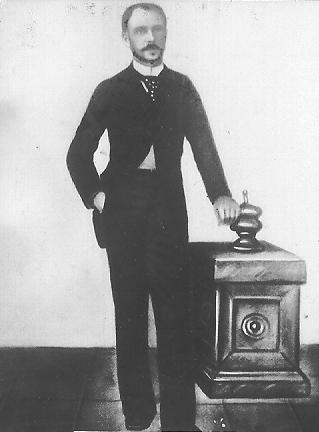
- Born: 4 March 1851; Sitges, Catalonia, Spain
- Died: 2 May 1925 (aged 74); Havana, La Habana Province, Cuba
- Spouse: Luz Cardona y Cardona (m. 1891–1920)
- Military career
- Branch: Carlist Army; Cuban Liberation Army
- Service years: 1895–1898
- Rank: Major General
- Conflicts: Third Carlist War; Cuban War of Independence: Invasion from East to West in Cuba; Battle of San Pedro

José Miró Argenter, also known as José de Miró Argenter, was a Cuban brigadier general and author of Catalonian origin who served during the Cuban War of Independence. He was a division General of the Cuban Liberation Army and a member of Antonio Maceo's General Staff. In 1899 he published his work Cuba: Chronicles of the War, which was a book on his participation in the Cuban War of Independence.

== Biography ==
=== Family ===
José Miró Argenter was the son of José Miró Armengol (1816– 1888), secretary and censor of the Sitges town hall, and Joaquina Argenter Llopis. He had three siblings: the painter Joaquim de Miró who was born on 3 February 1849, Rosa, mother of the painter Joaquim Sunyer, and Remei Miró Argenter.

=== Life in Spain ===
Argenter studied high school in Barcelona before entering the Faculty of Medicine of the Catalan capital in 1869. He left his medical studies to join the Carlist Army, where he reached the rank of lieutenant and the position of company commander.

=== Life in Cuba ===
In 1874 he embarked for Cuba to settle in Havana and work at the firm Barahona y Domenech which had old acquaintances of his father. Two years later, for health reasons, he accepted the invitation of the Catasús brothers, and worked as a foreman at the "Río Grande" mill, near Santiago de Cuba, where he met Major General Antonio Maceo at lunch. Argenter gave Maceo a farewell on 8 May 1878, just before Maceo left for Jamaica. He then begins a career in journalism and his first article El Juez y el Negro led him to be arrested for three years, six months and twenty-one days of exile a hundred kilometers from his residence.

He then settled at Holguín and directed the newspaper La Doctrina. In Holguín he married Luz Cardona y Cardona in 1891 and Miró was fully involved in the ongoing Cuban independence revolution. In 1893 he founded El Liberal. In 1894 his first daughter, Remedios Miró Cardona, was born. He then collaborated with the Gómez-Maceo Plan in Oriente.

=== Cuban War of Independence ===
During the Cuban War of Independence, he enlisted on the first day, at the head of a contingent of patriots in Holguín with the rank of colonel as he joined the orders of his friend Maceo. On 14 April 1895, he fought in Ciego La Rioja. After Maceo's arrival on the Island, he ratified his rank and incorporated him into his General Staff. He stood out in Peralejo, and was proposed to the rank of Brigadier General before the Governing Council recognized the degree on 29 September. Days later he was promoted to the position of Chief of Staff of the invading column, with which he left Baraguá.

He was by Maceo's side in the Invasion and throughout the Western Campaign . He stood out in the battles of Iguará, La Lechuza, Cacarajícara, Rubí and Bejerano. He escorted Maceo to the crossing of the trail from Mariel to Majana, falling wounded three days later in San Pedro, where Maceo fell. Due to his service at the Battle of Mal Tiempo, he was proposed to Major General, but it was not until the end of the war that he was awarded the rank.

Saddened by Maceo's death at the Battle of San Pedro, he went to Camagüey to continue to Manzanillo, Cuba, where he showed little activity during the rest of the war. Whether Miró got to know José Martí personally is disputed; In a letter dated 7 May 1895, addressed to General José Miró Argenter, Martí says goodbye stating:

...with great desire to see you up close sometime.

In the General Military Archive of Segovia, there are several open cases against José Miró Argenter for various reasons of assault, arson and murder. The causes are numbered as: Cause 10808 (fire); cause 1507 for triple murder; cause 416 for threats to the railway company; cause 333 for rebellion however all of these cases were dismissed

=== Later years ===
He was appointed Inspector of the Department of the East as well as Secretary of the Liquidating Board of the Cuban Liberation Army. During the first years of the Cuban Republic, he was in charge of the archives of the Liberation Army. He restarted his journalistic activities. In 1900 his second son was born in San Luis, Santiago de Cuba, who, in homage to Maceo, would be named Antonio Maceo Miró Cardona. On 22 August 1902, his third child, José Miró Cardona was born and who would be Cuba's provisional prime minister at the beginning of 1959. In 1920 his wife Luz Cardona died and José died at Havana on 2 May 1925 .

From 1899 to 1909, he wrote Crónicas de la Guerra, which was an exhaustive compendium of military actions and his own personal experiences, where he offers a detailed description of the events related to the death of Antonio Maceo, among other battles and actions of war. He also wrote in 1897 "Death of General Maceo" and "Notes on the life of Antonio Maceo Grajales" and the drama: "El Pacífico" in 1914 edited by Imprenta y papelería de Rambla, Bouza y Cª de La Habana with the same publishing house that in 1910 he published his novel "Salvador Roca".
