= Carlos Roloff =

Polish-born Cuban general (1842–1907)

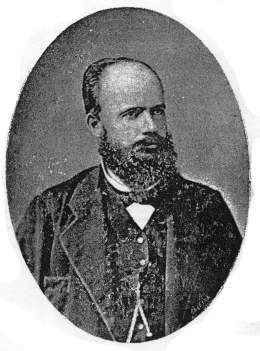
- Born: Karol Rolow-Miałowski; 4 November 1842; Warsaw, Congress Poland, Russian Empire
- Died: 17 May 1907 (aged 64); Guanabacoa, Provisional Government of Cuba
- Spouse: Galatea Guardiola (m. 1883)
- Children: 5
- Military career
- Allegiance: United States; Cuban revolutionaries Cuban revolutionaries
- Branch: Union Army; Cuban Liberation Army
- Service years: (United States) 1862–1864; 1869–1878; 1895–1898
- Rank: Captain; Major-general
- Units: 9th Ohio Infantry Regiment; Villareños; 4th Corps
- Conflicts: American Civil War; Ten Years' War; Cuban War of Independence

Karol Rolow-Miałowski or Carlos Roloff Mialofsky, better known simply as Carlos Roloff, (4 November 1842 – 17 May 1907) was a Polish-born Cuban general and liberation activist, who fought against Spain in the Ten Years' War and the Cuban War of Independence in the Las Villas Province.

== Early life and American Civil War ==
Roloff was born in Warsaw on 4 November 1842 to a Polish family. He was the second of three children had by Karol Rolow and Loisa Miałowska, having an older brother and younger sister. As a child, his family moved to Königsberg, Kingdom of Prussia, where he learned German, business, and military strategy in school. After his father's death in 1862, he and his brother immigrated to the United States. They briefly stayed in New York before moving to Cincinnati, Ohio.

Roloff served in the Union Army during the American Civil War in the 9th Ohio Infantry Regiment, working under the command of August Willich. He obtained the rank of captain before being discharged when the unit disbanded in June 1864.

== Ten Years' War ==
=== Las Villas campaign ===
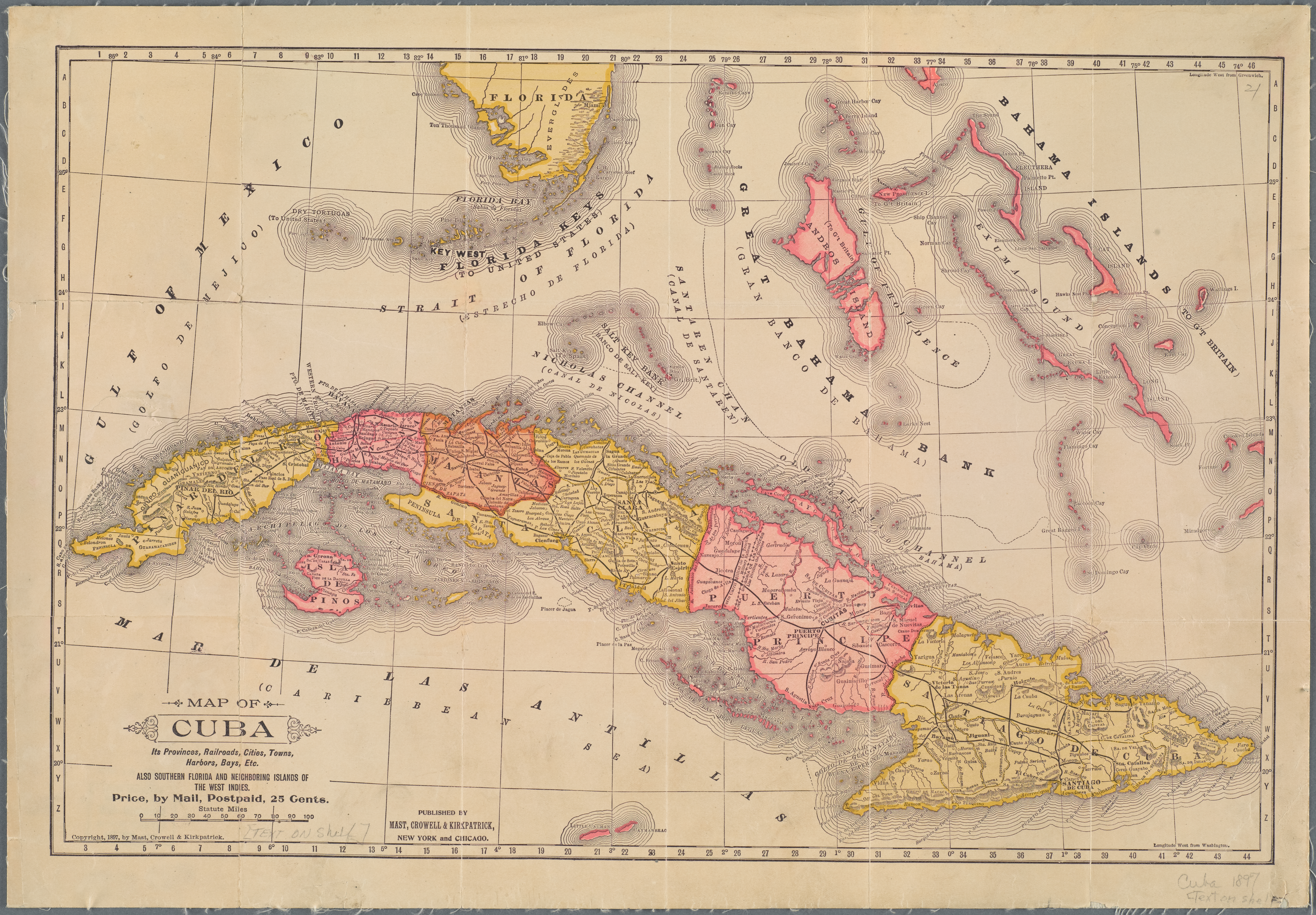
Colonial provinces of Cuba in 1895. Center yellow being Las Villas (Santa Clara)

That same year he traveled to Cuba after being hired by Bishop and Company, an American sugar-exporting firm in Caibarién, Las Villas Province, as a bookkeeper. In Caibarién he became known as Carlos Roloff Mialofsky. He was a founder of the San Juan Masonic Lodge in 1866 and was treasurer of the El Progreso Social Club, gaining a local reputation for his success in the position.

In 1868, the struggle for Cuban independence culminated in the Ten Years' War. The conflict began with Carlos Manuel de Céspedes and Ignacio Agramonte's uprisings in the east, with many being motivated to join due to dissatisfaction with the policies of Captain-General Francisco de Lersundi. The revolution spread to Las Villas in February 1869 with patriots from Santa Clara, Sagua La Grande, Remedios, Cienfuegos, Trinidad, and Sancti Spíritus meeting to form the Las Villas Junta at the El Cafetal González coffee plantation. They planned for their uprising to commence on 7 February. As the majority of members were strictly civilian they sought out a military leader and when confronted, Roloff accepted, joining on the evening of 6 February.

The Junta was looking for someone with military experience who would teach us how to fight. It soon learned that in Caibarién there was a Pole who had served in the war between the North and the South. Luis Fernández was ordered to speak with him and he immediately accepted. He arrived last night and we were very glad because being a Pole meant being a hero.

— Pablo Díaz de Villegas

Roloff's grandson, Felipe Roloff, claimed that Carlos had already been conspiring to launch an uprising, being that he was close to patriots Emilio Núñez, Serafín Sánchez, and Pancho Carrillo, all of whom felt revolutionary fervor during the eastern uprisings. Miguel Jerónimo Gutiérrez named sugar mill owner Joaquín Morales as commander-in-chief and Roloff as major-general and chief-of-staff in Las Villas. Morales admitted that he was reliant on the latter, as he himself had no military experience.

It is ridiculous for me to serve as Commander-in-Chief when I don't even know how to stand [at] attention. This is extremely comical. I only have accepted this appointment because people have asked me to and because there is a need for this post to be occupied by a sugar mill owner so that those with property would trust us. Also, that way, the Spaniards cannot say that we are a group of ruffians, interested in nothing more than plundering and ransacking. So, as Commander- in-Chief, I really don't have much to do, because Roloff will [militarily] do everything.

On 7 February, carrying a Cuban flag, (Note: The flag was made and given to Roloff, who carried it throughout the conflict, by Inés Morillo Sánchez from Camagüey.) around 5,000 poorly equipped Villareños (Note: The unit had approximately 200 guns, almost all of which being old muskets.) traveled from the coffee plantation to Manicaragua. On 17 February, Roloff led 100 men in an attempt to take Santo Domingo, failing due to low ammunition. Two days after, he won at San Gil leading 300 men with rudimentary wooden cannons against 700 Spaniards. On 6 March, three regiments totaling 800 men led by provincial governor, Trillo Figueroa, lost at Santa Cruz del Líbano. A week later, a Spanish regiment attacked the Villareños while they rested, killing 14 men.

The Junta discussed future plans as they were low on munitions. Roloff suggested a scorched earth campaign in the sugar-rich west to gain freedmen volunteers and to harm the colonial economy. The proposal was rejected citing a lack of resources; it was decided they move to the Oriente Province to receive supplies from Céspedes. During their march, Roloff's forces sabotaged bridges, telegraph poles, railways, and burned sugar plantations.

=== Collaboration with Céspedes ===
In early April, the Villareños arrived in Camagüey Province and on 10 April met with Céspedes and other mambises to draft the Guáimaro Constitution. Established was the House of Representatives, which held the responsibility of delegating positions, including president, and named Céspedes the President of the Republic in Arms, with him being sworn in with the flag carried by Roloff.

Ultimately the Villareños did not acquire arms and returned to their home province. They engaged in guerrilla warfare, now assaulting in machete-wielding cavalry charges.

Dissension spurred within patriot ranks. Roloff, being involved, labeled Céspedes a dictator and was arrested for it by the president in mid-July 1872. He retracted the comment and apologized, allowing for his release on 25 July. Commander-in-chief Ignacio Agromente's death on 11 May 1873, vitalized a power vacuum and greater division between the House of Representatives and Céspedes. Militarily-experienced Máximo Gómez was promoted to the position by the president. Upon an appeal for more powers Céspedes was deposed on 17 October 1873.

=== Final years ===
Gómez with 2,000 men joined the Villareños after crossing the Trocha from Júcaro to Morón on 6 January 1875. He gave Roloff command of the Second Division and ordered him to attack Sagua La Grande, falsely claimed to be holding a Spanish garrison. Roloff refused and was promptly relieved of command and assigned chief-of-intelligence with the objective of gathering information on western Cuba for a patriot assault; he was dissatisfied with the change as he wanted to retain command on the battlefield. The regionalist Villareños disagreed with Gómez's vision for an invasion west. They formed the Unión Repúblicana with Roloff leading them. Gómez attempted to quell the group by returning Roloff to military command, this time of the First Division, but on 1 October was demanded to step down and allow for Roloff to become commander-in-chief. Gómez without fight transferred the role.

The war turned against the patriots due to infighting and the arrival of a new well supported captain-general in late 1876. On 11 February 1878, the Pact of Zanjón was signed, recognizing the war was to come to an end. Roloff was among a number of patriots that disagreed with the action and continued to fight along with the Villareños. In the following months, Villareño forces gradually surrendered as they faced against the Spanish commander in the region who received 60,000 pesos until ordered to stop by the Cuban Patriotic Junta in April.

== External support for Cuban independence ==
=== Little War and Marriage ===
Prior to leaving Cuba, he had a son named Gerardo with Benita Alvarez. He was born in Remedios in 1877. In July, Roloff left to New York and in August was in Cincinnati with his relatives.

In New York City during March 1879, he became secretary-treasurer of the Cuban Revolutionary Committee led by Calixto García, an organization dedicated to achieving Cuban independence. To support García and other patriots participating in the Little War, Roloff went to the Colony of Jamaica in March 1880 to raise funds, though the conflict ended in failure by August. Roloff remained in Jamaica with fellow veterans of the Ten Years' War, Antonio Maceo and Máximo Gómez, until late 1881, before he left to Amapala, Honduras to work at the town's central bank. He was designated vice consul by the United States government and entered the country with Dr. Eusebio Hernández Pérez at Puerto Cortés.

On 24 December, he arrived in Amapala. On 3 February 1883, he married Galatea Guardiola, daughter of former Honduran President Santos Guardiola, at Tegucigalpa Cathedral. They had 4 children, Carlos, Ana Luisa, Julio, and María Francisca, born in 1886, 1890, 1892, and 1894, respectively.

=== Activism in the United States ===
In 1892, he returned to the United States answering, along with other veterans of the Ten Years' War, José Martí for a new plan to achieve Cuban independence. Roloff met Martí in New York City, moving to Tampa, Florida afterward in June, and joined Martí's pro-independence Cuban Revolutionary Party. Martí was leader and Máximo Gómez, then residing in the Second Dominican Republic, was commander-in-chief. After Martí funded newspaper, Patria, reported:

Tampa salutes Roloff, the hero who fought day and night for ten years for the freedom of a land which was not his. Today he is received with admiration by everyone and everyone seeks to shake his hand and express love and admiration for this son of Poland, who today is our honored guest in Tampa.

He responded with a speech advocating for the party:

[...] the Cuban Revolutionary Party is the entity with which your support will once and for all, end the Spanish government's tyranny in Cuba. Our war will not be an isolated war, it will be an all-out war conducted by the people in Cuba, the Cuban immigrant community, the foreigners who love Cuba, and those who fight for our principles; the principles of freedom, justice and equality.

Throughout June he sought donations from cigar workers and created Patriotic Clubs. Cuban émigrés were meant to enroll and pay a membership fee. In July, he continued in Key West, where he also received a warm welcome. Roloff spent 3 years traveling across the United States with Martí to fundraise. By 1894 the clubs totaled to 126 in 18 cities; Key West had 62. He also led the Lotería de la Patria, which ran from August 1894 to March 1895 and raised thousands of dollars for the party.

=== Fernandina Plan ===
The Fernandina Plan was devised by the party, planning for the Revolution to commence in January 1895. Roloff, among other generals, was involved in organizing the military effort. In cooperation with businessman Nathaniel Borden, 3 ships were chartered, the Lagonda, Amadís, and Baracoa. Roloff and Serafín Sánchez were to board the Lagonda in Key West with 150 men after it was loaded with munitions in Fernandina. Colonel Fernando López de Queralta disobeyed Martí's orders of maintaining secrecy regarding the contents of Lagonda while it was in Fernandina; he properly labeled said contents and freely stated to others that military equipment was aboard. The New York World reported that Martí was seen in Fernandina, which prompted Spanish ambassador Emilio de Muruaga to claim U.S. violation of national neutrality laws and requested an investigation. On 14 January, American officials detained the vessels. The Lagonda was seized and 800 rifles and 600,000 rounds of ammunition found in a warehouse were confiscated. The Amadís and Baracoa were released back to their owners after no military equipment was found. The party was left with $3,000 after the fiasco's expense of $25,000 to $40,000. The party afterword resorted to more contributions from Cuban cigar manufacturers, workers, and Patriotic Clubs.

== Cuban War of Independence ==
On 24 February 1895, the Cuban War of Independence began. Martí and Gómez initiated the revolution while Roloff was organizing his expedition. He was watched by Spanish consul Pedro Solís and American authorities in Key West. To avert the watchers the expeditionary force moved camp to Big Pine Key to await a vessel. The men were restless due to the inhospitable environment and lacking provisions but on 18 July the James Woodall picked up the force and landed them at Tayabacoa, Las Villas Province at 9:30 A.M. on 24 July. Reports of the expedition's supplies vary. (Note: "...150 men along with 300 rifles, 200 machetes, 300,000 rounds of ammunition, and several pounds of dynamite." "...353 men, 1,000 rifles, and 500 pounds of dynamite." "...280 men, 28,000 rounds of ammunition, 450 rifles, 4,700 pounds of dynamite, one Gatling gun, and one cannon." "...about more 150 men, 300 rifles, and 200,000 rounds of ammunition...")

He was in command of the Fourth Corps. He demanded payment from sugar planters and if they refused, promptly burned their fields. On 18 September, upon the creation of a new constitution he was elected to the cabinet of President Salvador Cisneros Betancourt as Secretary of War. In this position he gathered weapons and organized expeditions, creating the Department of Expeditions. To supply offensives he was asked to return to the United States. There he successfully organized expeditions but was arrested in New York City, being charged with violating American laws against filibustering. He was taken to Ludlow Street Jail but later had the charges dropped.

After the death of Antonio Maceo, Roloff vowed to avenge him. He organized an expedition with 2,050 rifles, 300 machetes, and 2 small cannons, landing on 21 March 1897. He lost the position of Secretary of War in September and was officially replaced upon the drafting of the La Yaya Constitution.

He with Sánchez led the capture of Las Varas against 2,000 Spaniards commanded by Colonel Rubin. Meanwhile, the Spanish–American War sparked. The efforts of the Cubans and Americans ended with the Treaty of Paris on 10 December 1898. The result of the war was the United States Military Government in Cuba governing until 1902.

== Post-war ==
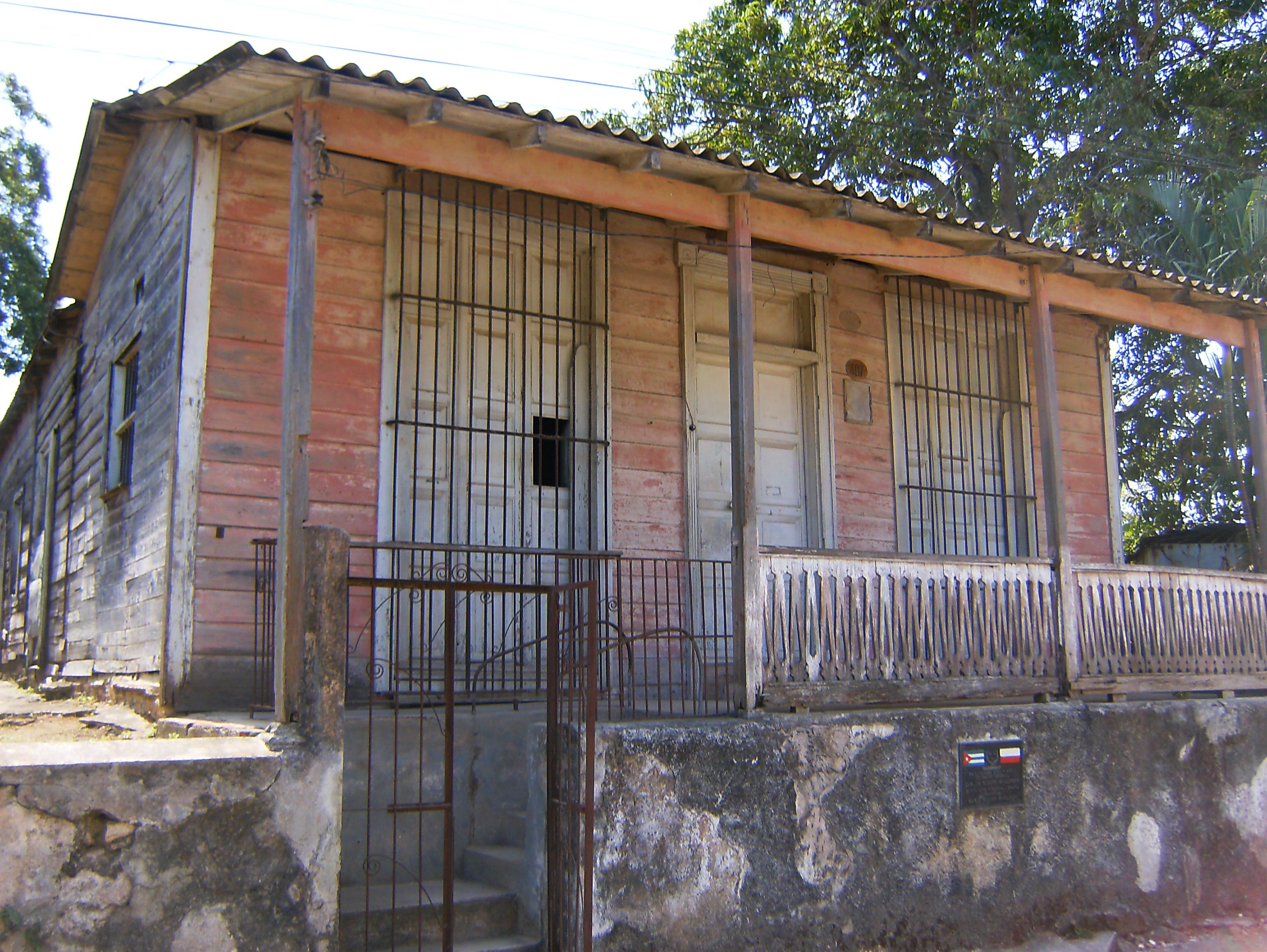
Home, where Roloff lived his last years

In 1901, he was granted Cuban citizenship and nominated state-treasurer of the independent republic. He retained the role until his death, upon which he was succeeded by Fernando Figueredo Socarrás. He compiled the Indice alfabético y defunciones del Ejército Libertador de Cuba, guerra de independencia, iniciada el 24 de febrero de 1895 y terminada oficialmente el 24 de agosto de 1898 with his son, Gerardo. The work contains the names of deceased and living patriot veterans.

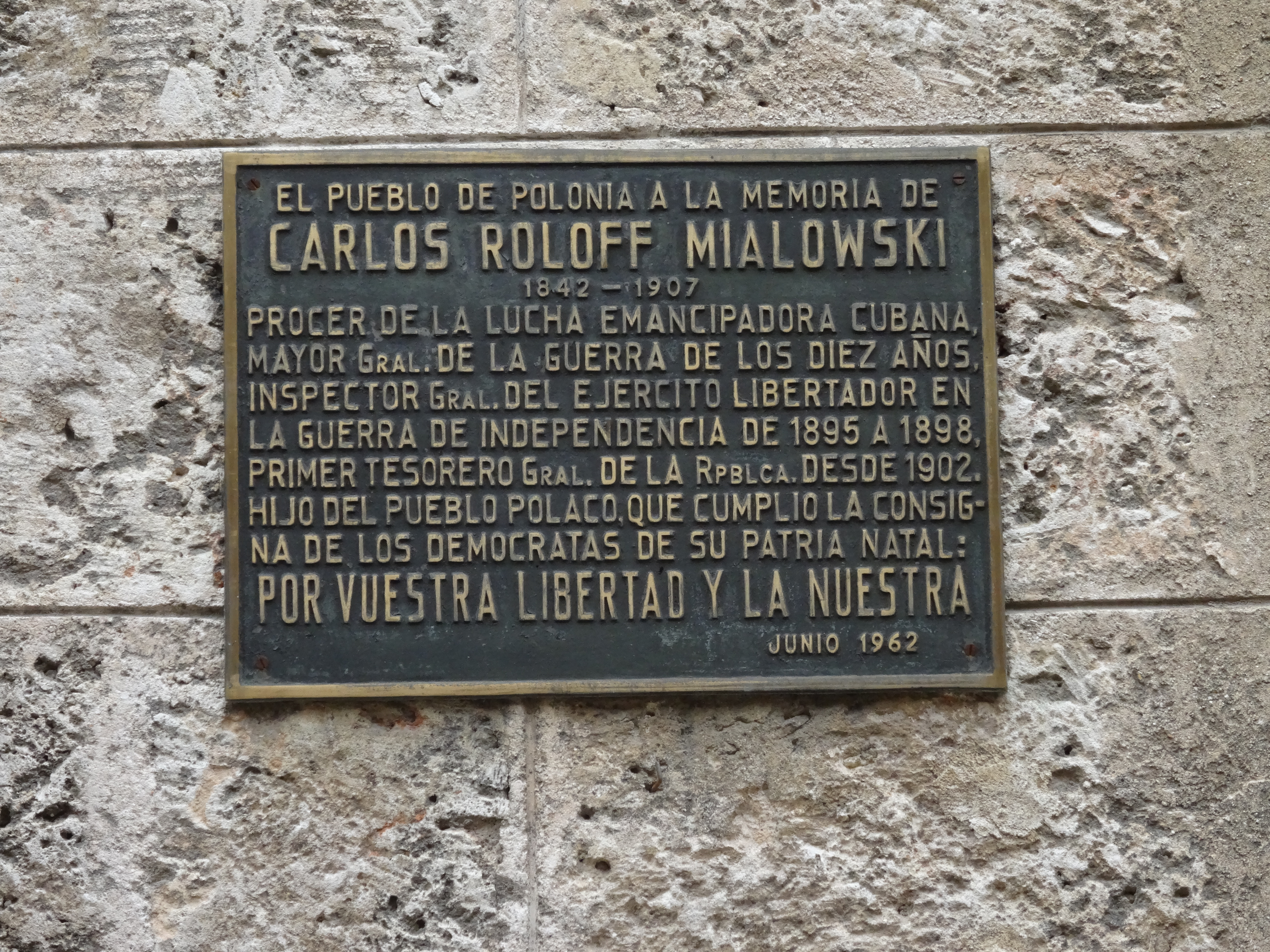
Plaque in tribute to Carlos Roloff Mialowski at Palacio de los Capitanes Generales, Havana, Cuba

He lived the remainder of his life with his family in Guanabacoa. In 1905, he began to suffer from congestive heart failure and with increasingly deteriorating health died on 17 May 1907. His body was laid in state at Havana City Hall with thousands visiting.

== Bibliography ==
- Castillo Canelas, Patricia Elizabeth (26 July 2019). "Inmigración y colonización en Honduras durante la Reforma Liberal, 1876-1891". Población y Desarrollo - Argonautas y Caminantes. 15: 26–33. doi:10.5377/pdac.v15i0.8114. S2CID 212982275.
- Fernández, José B. (2012). "Major General Carlos Roloff Mialofsky: The Polish Mambí". Polish American Studies. 69 (1): 9–26. doi:10.2307/41440999. ISSN 0032-2806. JSTOR 41440999. S2CID 254436013.
- Fernández, José B. (2017). "Major General Carlos Roloff Mialofsky: a Polish "Mambí" in the USA". Camino Real: Estudios de las Hispanidades Norteamericanas. 9: 133–148. ISSN 1889-5611.
- McGillivary, Gilliam (2007). "Revolution in the Cuban Countryside: The Blazing Cane of Las Villas, 1895–1898". Cuban Studies. 38: 50–81. ISSN 0361-4441. JSTOR 24487246.
- Parker, William Belmont (1919). Cubans of Today. G. P. Putnam's sons. ISBN 1343749557.
- Stebbins, Consuelo E. (2007). "The Cuban Convention and Its Role in the Cuban Revolutionary Party". The Florida Historical Quarterly. 86 (2): 186–215. ISSN 0015-4113. JSTOR 25594610.
- W. D., Tucker (1920). History of the organization of the United Spanish war veterans. FB&C Limited. p. 15. ISBN 1331197589.
- United States, United States (1901). Compilation of Reports of Committee on Foreign Relations, United States Senate, 1789-1901, First Congress, First Session, to Fifty-Sixth Congress, Second Session. Washington D.C.: U.S. Government Publishing Office.
- Ziegler, Vanessa Michelle (2007). The Revolt of "The Ever-faithful Isle" : the Ten Years' War in Cuba, 1868-1878 (PDF). [Santa Barbara, Calif.]: University of California, Santa Barbara. ISBN 978-0549414186.
