= Salvador Arizón y Sánchez Fano =

Spanish General (1853–1921)

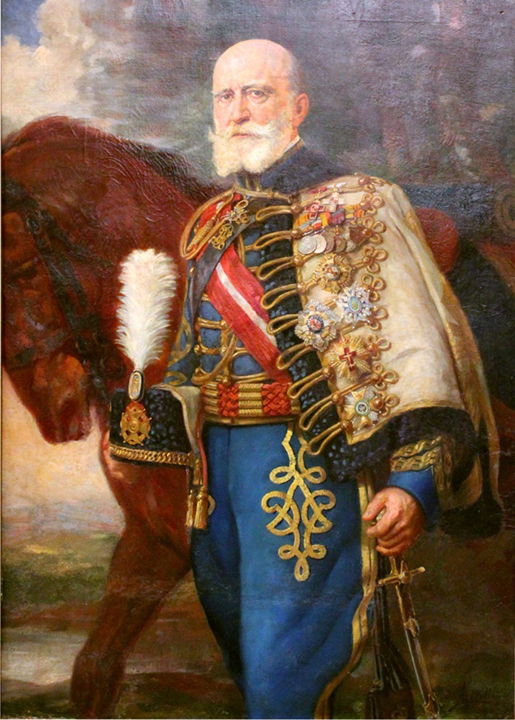
- A portrait by Víctor Morelli

Directorate-General of the Civil Guard
- In office June 26, 1917 – December 6, 1918
- Monarch: Alfonso XIII
- Prime Minister: Eduardo Dato
- Preceded by: Agustín de Luque y Coca
- Succeeded by: Juan Zubia y Bassecourt

Personal details
- Born: July 2, 1853 Barcelona, Province of Barcelona, Spain
- Died: March 1, 1921 (aged 67) Seville, Province of Seville, Spain
- Spouse: Juana Mejía Castaño (m. 1894)
- Children: 8

Military service
- Allegiance: Spain
- Branch: Spanish Army
- Years of service: 1865 – 1921
- Rank: Lieutenant General
- Battles/wars: List: Third Carlist War; Basque-Navarrese front; Battle of Montejurra; Siege of Pamplona Cuban War of Independence; Invasion from East to West in Cuba; Battle of Mal Tiempo Philippine Revolution Second Melillan campaign Kert campaign

Salvador de Arizón y Sánchez-Fano (1853–1921) was a Spanish Lieutenant General who participated in the Cuban War of Independence and the Philippine Revolution. He was a member of the House of Arizón as well as the Directorate-General of the Civil Guard from June 26, 1917, to December 6, 1918.

== Third Carlist War and Cuban War of Independence ==
Salvador was born on July 2, 1853, at Barcelona as the son of Don Salvador Arizón y Castro who was a major Spanish General during the First Carlist War and the Dominican Restoration War and Carmen Sánchez-Fano y Prados. After his father was killed at Puerto Plata, Arizón was appointed minor cavalry lieutenant by the royal order of Isabella II in remembrance of his father. He began serving at garrison duty in 1871 before being transferred to the Army of the North. During the Third Carlist War, he fought at the Battle of Montejurra, the Siege of Pamplona and captured Estella-Lizarra from the Carlist forces. After the war, he received the Red Cross of Military Merit as well as two promotions. After spending some time with the Lanceros de Farnesio and Húsares de la Princesa Regiments in 1886, he was promoted to Commander in 1888 and was the aide-de-camp to General Sabas Marín at Cuba. After returning to Spain in 1893 and promoted to lieutenant colonel, he returned to Cuba to participate at the Cuban War of Independence which left him wounded but earned him a promotion to Colonel of the Cavalry in 1895 and appointed military commander of Cienfuegos. In 1894, he married Juana Mejía Castaño and they later had 8 children.

== Philippine Revolution and Later Years ==
He later participated in the Philippine Revolution to crush the rebellion and initially did well until he was infected with a disease and had to return to Spain for medical treatment. After the war, he was given command of other brigades and appointed military commander of Cádiz and Guipúzcoa. He was promoted to Divisional General in 1906 and given command of the 4th Division as well as being appointed military governor of Granada. He was later military governor of Melilla from 1909 to 1912, he participated at the Second Melillan campaign and the Kert campaign, winning the Grand Cross of the Military Order of Maria Cristina. After being promoted to Lieutenant General in 1912, he was the Captain General of the VIII Military Region at Galicia, the Directorate-General of the Cavalry in 1915 and the Directorate-General of the Civil Guard from June 26, 1917, to December 6, 1918. The last office he would be given was commander of the II Military Region of Andalusia from 1918 until his death on March 1, 1921.

== Awards ==
- Red Cross of Military Merit, 1st Class
- White Cross of Military Merit, 1st Class
- Military Order of Maria Cristina, 2nd Class
- Royal and Military Order of Saint Hermenegild, Grand Cross
- Military Order of Maria Cristina, Grand Cross
- Order of Charles III

=== Foreign Awards ===
- Cambodia: Imperial Order of the Dragon of Annam, Grand Cross
