= Invasion from East to West in Cuba =

- Part of Cuban War of Independence
Date	October 22, 1895 – January 22, 1896
Location	West of the island of Cuba
Result	Cuban victory Extension of the war to the entire island.

Belligerents
Cuban Nationalists	Spain

Commanders and leaders
Máximo Gómez; José Miró Argenter; Bernabé Boza	Arsenio Martínez Campos

Strength
83,990	64,500

The Invasion from East to West took place on the island of Cuba, and began on October 22, 1895, in Mangos de Baraguá, in the former province of Oriente. It was organized and directed by Antonio Maceo Grajales and Máximo Gómez. The Liberation Army, guided by the firmness of taking the fight against Spanish colonialism to all corners of Cuba, starred in one of the most relevant events in Cuban history. In the midst of the "Cuban War of Independence", inspired by José Martí, that campaign responded to the old desire of the insurgent generals Maceo and Gómez. These launched the strategy of limiting the liberation struggle to the eastern territory of the Island, but rather extending it throughout the entire Cuban territory to force Spain to fight simultaneously in the six provinces that the country had at that time, in order to weaken it on all fronts.

== Background ==
Already during the Ten Years' War there was an independence attempt to carry out this invasion. After several frustrated attempts, it began on January 1, 1875. However, for various reasons, this invasion continued indefinitely, at the same time that it was unable to advance throughout the island, reaching only as far as the western end of Las Villas. By August 1876 the invasion was stagnant in that area due to various organizational deficiencies and contradictions between the Mambi officials and the pro-independence government. The failure of the invasion of 1875-1876 laid the foundation for the Cuban defeat in the Ten Years' War.

== Conception of the new invasion ==
On May 5, 1895 at the meeting of Maximo Gomez, Antonio Maceo and José Martí had dealt with the problems and the need for the invasion. Gomez was of the criteria to do it as soon as possible, something that Maceo did not share.

== Formation of the Invasion of Camagüeyano-Villaclareño ==
The insurgent troops were victorious in combats such as the crossing of the trail from Júcaro to Morón, this was for many insurmountable, but Gómez easily circumvented the setbacks on the road to the Villa Clara Province .

== Formation of the Eastern Invading Contingent ==
After the Assembly of Jimaguayú, immediately, Maceo located his Headquarters in Cayo Francés (1 km from Baraguá), where he was very active, issuing orders for the concentration of Cuban forces. The delay of the voluntary forces of the second corps caused a delay in the departure that Maceo, who tried to compensate for this situation, departing on October 22, 1895, from Baraguá, and arriving at Mala Noche, a new concentration point, where he remained from October 31, 1895, to November 3.

Maceo managed to gather about 1000 men from the 1st corps and a scarce 400 men from the second corps. The contingent was organized with a general staff under the command of Brigadier José Miró Argenter, an escort, a surveillance body, a cavalry under the command of Brigadier Luis de Feria and an infantry under the command of Brigadier Quintín Banderas. The eastern invading contingent, protected by forces from the second and third corps, crossed Camagüey, and crossed the Júcaro-Morón trail, to meet with the invading Camagüeyano-Villaclareño contingent of Máximo Gómez .

== Formation of the Invading Army ==
On November 30, 1895, Maceo with the Government and the eastern invading contingent arrived at the Headquarters of Major General Máximo Gómez and Lázaro López. The invading army is organized with the Eastern, Camagüey and Villa Clara contingents (the largest with 1,950 men) adding 4,000 troops, including 3,000 cavalry and 1,000 infantry. The invading army had a recognized force, made up of more than 4 thousand men; although most of them barefoot, with threadbare clothes and poorly fed. However, the appalling conditions did not detract from the morale of the army. The Spanish Army, as a European power, had the advantages of a regular army of 200,000 troops, equipped with more modern weapons and sheltered behind fortifications and camps, although most of them were ill with tropical diseases.

== Invasion of the West by the Invader Army ==
In the Battle of Mal Tiempo a colonialist battalion was totally annihilated, as well as the confrontations in Las Taironas, Calimete and Coliseo were crucial. Then it advanced through the plains surrounding the capital of the country and culminated in the mountains of Pinar del Río, at the western end of Cuba.

The invasion lasted 92 days, of frontal fighting along almost 1,800 kilometers. The Spanish command saw how the strategy to contain and repel the invaders was failing. In their advance the invaders occupied a score of towns.

== Bibliography ==
- Aparicio, Raúl: Hombradía de Maceo. Havana, 1996.
- Palenque, Amado: The Invasion Campaign 1895–96. Social Sciences Publishing House, Havana, year 1988.
- Souza, Benigno: Historical essay of the invasion.
