= Cuban Liberation Army =

Cuban army of independence

- Ejército Libertador de Cuba (Spanish)
- The flag that the combatants of the Cuban Liberation Army carried with them into battle

- The flag used by Carlos Manuel de Céspedes and the fighters in Oriente before the Assembly of Guáimaro
- Founded: 1868
- Disbanded: 1899
- Service branches: Infantry; Cavalry; Artillery

Personnel
- Active personnel: 15,000–53,774

Related articles
- History: Ten Years' War (1868–1878); Little War (1879–1880); War of 1895 (1895–1898); Spanish–American War (1898)

The Cuban Liberation Army (Spanish: Ejército Libertador de Cuba), colloquially known as the Mambí Army (Ejército Mambí) was an insurgent army which was formed in the last third of the 19th century and fought for independence from Spain and the abolition of slavery. It first saw combat in the Ten Years' War (1868–1878) under the command of Carlos Manuel de Céspedes, Ignacio Agramonte, and Carlos Roloff. The independentists were decentralized and operated within their own regions autonomously of each other, until the Assembly of Guáimaro established the Republic-in-Arms of Cuba and the Liberation Army's command structure. After the Pact of Zanjón, a brief uprising called the Little War saw Majors-General Calixto García and Antonio Maceo lead the Army of Liberation in another attempt at independence and the abolition of slavery, though unsuccessfully. Finally, during the War of Independence, the Liberation Army was once again organized to fight against the Spanish colonial government. The Liberation Army would reach its highest count of active members in the Spanish-American War, when an imminent Cuban-American victory caused hitherto anti-independence elites to join the Liberation Army. These recruits were nicknamed "Sunflowers" because they "point to where the sun is shining".

== Uniforms and ranks ==
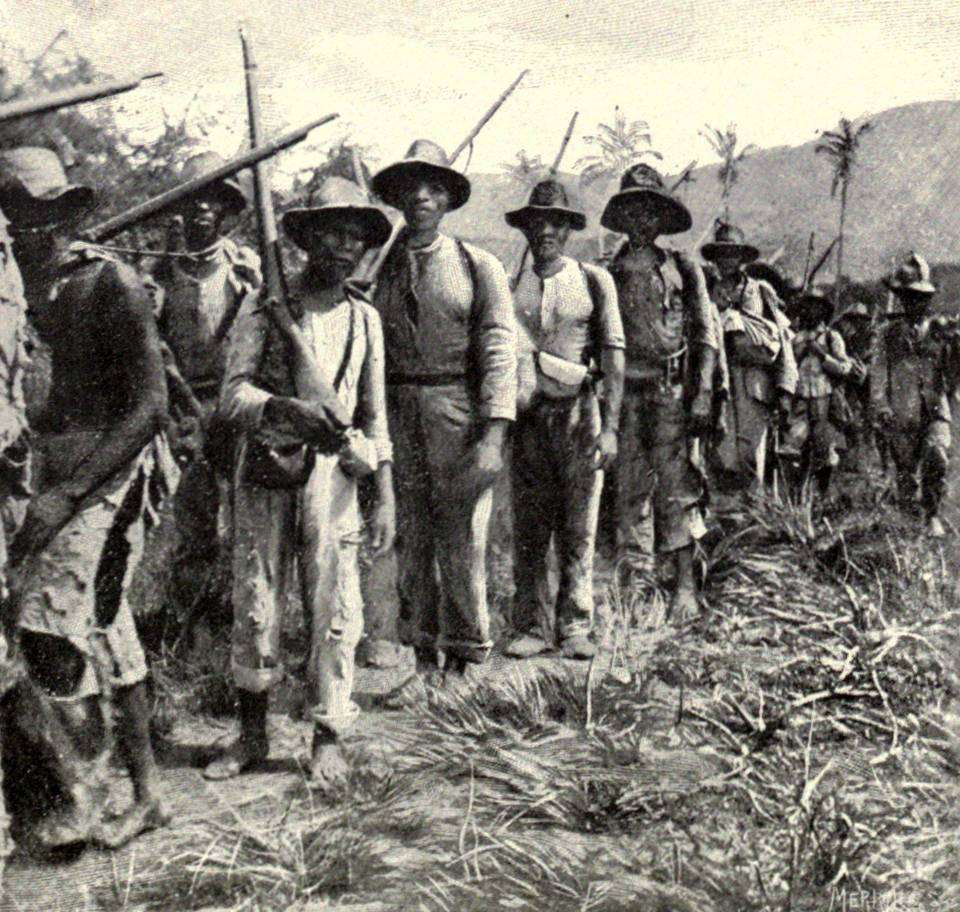
The clothing of the Cuban soldier was made of light, breathable fabrics. This was to help withstand the tropical heat.

The Cuban Liberation Army did not have a widespread or universal uniform, especially when they first began their operations. However, by 1895, most officers and some soldiers (especially those from expeditionary units who deployed to Cuba from Florida and New York) had a uniform of some sort. Common among all soldiers were straw hats, which were necessary for protection against the hot Cuban sun. Some of these hats had the front folded upwards, upon which the Cuban flag or the Coat of arms of Cuba were displayed.

The common dress uniform was a white or khaki drill tunic and trousers. The tunics would have folded collars, metal buttons, and pockets either on the breast or skirt. Upon the uniform, the men would wear any necessary accouterments and equipment, such as sheathes for machetes, pouches for bullets, and other supplies. In terms of footwear, military cobblers were producing boots for the combatants of the Liberation Army, but not everyone was able to get a pair. Straw sandals and bare-footedness were common.

Officers had distinctive insignia on their uniforms to identify their rank. Major-Generals, including the general-in-chief and lieutenant-general, wore three gold five-pointed stars on their collars. Divisional generals, which only became its own rank after the Little War, wore two such stars, and brigadiers, one.

Officers ranked lower than brigadier will wear a cloth patch backing on their machete sheath's sling, a tab on their shirt, or anywhere else visible. The color of the patch determines service branch. Blue means general staff, green means infantry, red means cavalry, light brown means artillery, brown means engineers, yellow means medical corps, black means judiciary corps, and white means civil government.

Colonels wear three gold stars on their patch, lieutenant-colonels, two, and commanders, one. Captains are designated similarly to colonels, but their stars are white rather than gold. Lieutenants have two white stars, and sublieutenants have one. First sergeants were designated similarly, but with horizontal bars instead of stars, which they had three of. Second sergeants had two bars, and corporals had one.

In 1895, there was a widespread rumor that the soldiers of the Liberation Army all wore nose rings. However, a fifteen-year-old plantation worker from Havana province went to see for himself, and returned with a definitive answer: the soldiers did not wear nose rings.

== Weapons ==
The Liberation Army equipped itself with a wide range of weapons for its operations. There were always issues with standardization and equipment shortages, especially in the beginning of the Ten Years' War and all throughout the Little War. There were many methods of acquiring weapons. Many of those who would go on to become insurgents may have owned a shotgun, rifle, or blunderbuss for hunting or other activities before the ownership of firearms and importation of weapons was banned in Cuba. Aristocratic creoles or gentlemen who joined the army might have owned a sword or saber to bring with them, and might have also had some training in fencing. The iconic weapon of the Liberation Army, however, was the machete, the common tool of the peasants, indentured servants, and slaves.

=== Firearms and Artillery ===
Besides local supplies and personal collections of guns that the insurgents might have owned, more weapons would be required to carry out successful military operations against the Spanish Army, one of the most powerful at the time. There were two main methods of acquiring firearms: armed expeditions which smuggled weapons into Cuba, or attacking Spanish columns, camps, trains and armories to steal guns and ammunition. Several expeditions were funded by organizations in the United States, such as the Revolutionary Junta in the Ten Years' War and the Cuban Revolutionary Party in the War of 1895.

On 22 December 1868, General Manuel de Quesada led 71 expeditionaries in bringing 2,540 Enfield Rifles, 150 Spencer Carbines, half a million rounds of ammunition, a cannon, 300 grenades, and a great amount of gunpowder. Carlos Roloff was heavily involved in expeditions during the 1895 war. He was an expert of bookkeeping, organization, and deception, which allowed him to fool Spanish spies and American officials who attempted to arrest him and confiscate his expeditions. On one such expedition, which landed in Tayabacoa, Las Villas, on July 24, 1895, at 9:30 PM, carried 150 men, 300 rifles, 300,000 rounds of ammunition, and several pounds of dynamite. Popular rifles to smuggle included the Enfield, Springfield 1861, Springfield 1873, Winchester Rifles, Spencers, Krag–Jørgensens, Colt Lightnings, and others. Revolvers were also acquired for officers and cavalry forces.

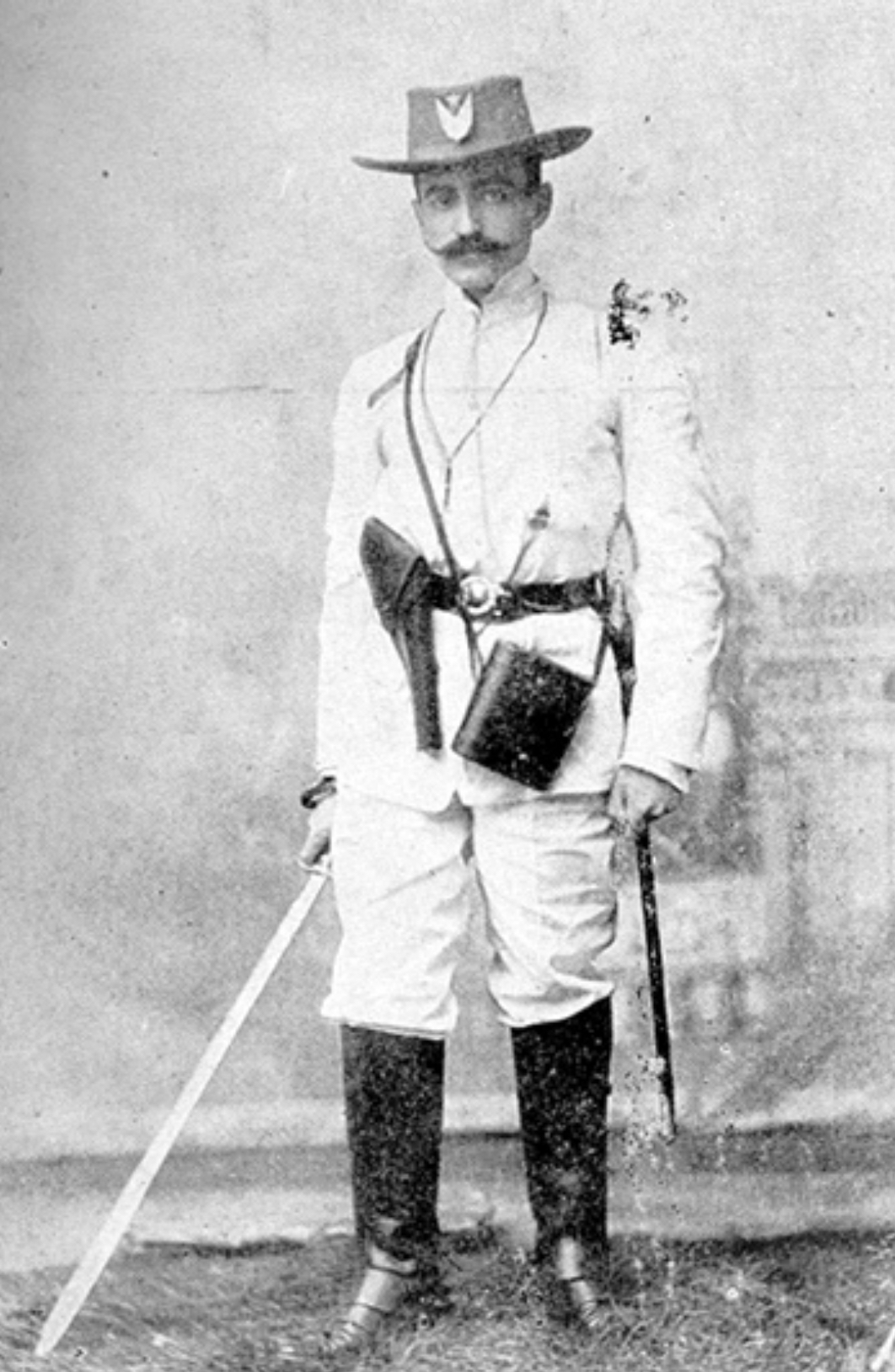
Mambí officer holding a machete and wearing a holster for a pistol.

During the Ten Years' War, the standard-issue rifle for the Spanish Army was the Remington Rolling Block in .43 Spanish. The Liberation Army would often raid for and capture these rifles and their ammunition for their own use. The same was done in the War of Independence, when the standard-issue rifle of the Spanish Army was the Mauser. The Remington was still in use with Volunteer units, which were typically Cuban Loyalists who fought for Spain, but could also be Basques who were born in regions which were not obligated by Spanish law to provide regiments to the crown.

In terms of artillery, cannons purchased in the United States were available in minuscule numbers. More common was the taking of Spanish cannons. In the War of 1895, the Spanish were by then using the Krupp gun, a breech-loading field gun. There was also native production of leather guns, which may have had a bronze or wooden barrel, which is then wrapped in leather. These were muzzleloaded, and had high risks of self destruction, especially after four shots. Carlos Roloff used these rudimentary cannons and 300 men to defeat a Spanish force of 700 at San Gil on February 19, 1869.

=== Bladed Weapons ===
Due to the general lack of firearms and ammunition, close-range weapons were needed to make up the difference. Indeed, some aristocratic individuals, like Ignacio Agramonte, would have owned a sword either to display their status or to use in duels. The more common sidearm, however, was the machete. Many different types were used, and each soldier used whichever he could get. At first, this meant the machetes used in the sugarcane fields to harvest the cane, but with time, other options would be made available. Workshops operated by the Liberation Army had the capability of producing machetes with blades that were specialized for combat. The preferred machete blade shape was single-edged and long, they also often had crossguards for hand protection. Machetes made by Collins & Co., a machete manufacturer from Hartford, Connecticut, were particularly popular with the insurgents, who purchased many models. The No. 22 was used by Cuban cavalry and, eventually, the Rough Riders and First US Volunteer Engineers. The Model No. 323 was especially made by Collins to circumvent Spanish weapon import bans. The machete used by Antonio Maceo was 73 centimeters long. Máximo Gómez's was 86. Most impressive, however, was the machete of José Guillermo "Guillermón" Moncada, which was 130 centimeters long.

Machetes have been in combat in Cuba since 1762. When the British sieged Havana, the mayor organized Free Black and Mulatto Militias to face the British in conjunction with the regular army. When muskets ran out, the militias took up machetes. Early on, the militias were able to capture and kill a number of British soldiers and officers, but the siege was lost when reinforcements from the thirteen colonies arrived. It's been the weapon of the many slave rebellions both in Cuba and elsewhere. Cuban slaves, inspired by events in Haiti, would attempt slave revolts in the early 1800s, none of which succeeded. On October 25, 1868, then-sergeant Máximo Gómez prepared an ambush as part of the Battle of Pino de Baire. After firing one volley of rifle fire from concealed positions, 40 infantrymen wielding machetes came down upon the Spanish soldiers. The shock and terror within the Spanish ranks was such that 233 casualties were sustained before the routing of the unit. Gómez, having served in both the Dominican and Spanish armies, would have seen similar charges in the Dominican War of Independence and the Restoration War. For his service in this battle, he was awarded the rank of general.

== Tactics and Strategy ==
Due to its nature as a generally poorly equipped and vastly outnumbered force, the Liberation Army had to depend on their strategies to win them victories. Such strategies did not purely rely on the force of arms, but also on the terrain, weather, and tropical diseases. The terrain was the native land of the members of the army, and thus would have granted an advantage. Furthermore, the Cuban soldiers were naturally immune to many of the diseases that the Spanish weren't. Most of the Spanish casualties from all three wars were from disease, but that's not to discount the tactics and strategies of the Liberation Army's leadership, who were effective at planning and executing many combative actions.

=== Infantry ===
The infantry of the Cuban Liberation Army fought in open order, generally negating the effect of Spanish artillery fire. Infantry units engaged in surprise attacks and ambushes and moved around extremely quickly, only coalescing into larger bodies of men when it was necessary. In the Campaign of La Reforma, the guerilla cells formed by Major-General Máximo Gómez were able to inflict an average of 40 daily casualties upon Spanish forces. One of the tactics used to achieve this was the shooting of Spanish camps from safe and hidden positions. Although these actions seldom resulted in bullet injuries or deaths among the Spanish troops, it deprived them of sleep, weakening them both in physical battle and in battle against disease and the elements. Major-General Antonio Maceo also made heavy use of infantry in his operations in Oriente and Pinar del Río. Due to the mountainous terrain these areas, cavalry forces were relegated to a support role for the infantry. By presenting the threat of a cavalry charge, the Spanish formation is forced to form square, providing the perfect target for infantry riflemen and cavalry carabiniers. Infantry were trained in the most elemental and essential skills for a soldier to possess. Often, training would be conducted by Spanish sergeants or corporals who joined the Cubans. The infantry were taught to stand in line formation to build unit cohesion, and they were taught to march in column for a similar purpose. It should be noted, however, that the column was used on campaign whenever the Cubans needed solid power to move through enemy territory or if they were protecting something. The Invasion of the West of the Island and Battle of Ceja del Negro are prime examples of column formation being used by Cuban forces. Changing from a marching formation into guerilla deployment rapidly was taught as well. Furthermore, several shooting positions were taught, such as 'knee on the ground' and 'on your feet'.

Former Confederate general Thomas Jordan was made General-in-Chief of the Liberation Army after the deposition of Manuel de Quesada. He graduated from the Military Academy of West Point, which was one of the reasons he was hired by the Revolutionary Junta to help with the insurrection in Cuba. He was unfamiliar with and didn't understand the need for the guerrilla tactics used by the Liberation Army, and thus conducted his battles in traditional manner. He resigned in 1870 due to lack of supplies which would be needed to continue conducting the war using his methods.

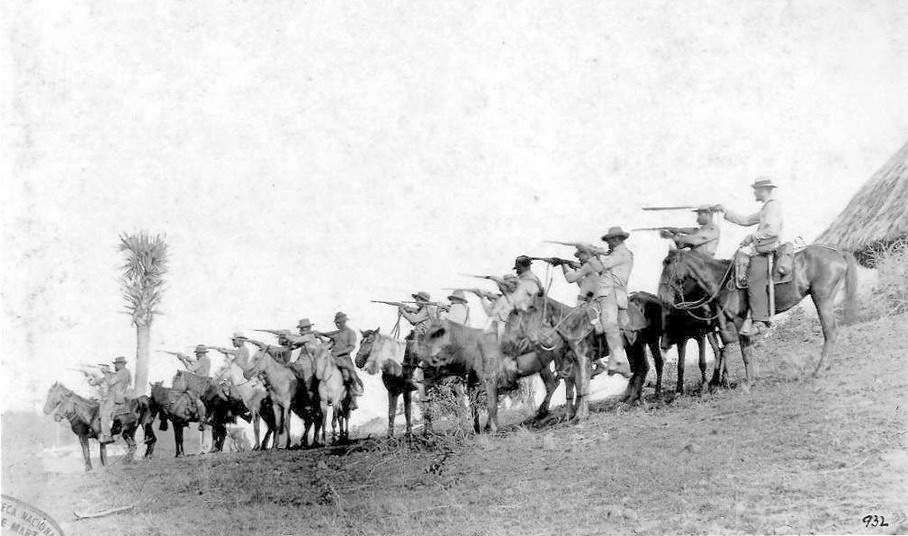
Cavalry forces were a powerful element of the Liberation Army, and were instrumental in some famous battles.

=== Cavalry ===
One of the most depicted branches of service of the Liberation Army in media is the cavalry. The cavalry was responsible for several tasks throughout the wars fought by the Liberation Army. Before the Battle of Dos Ríos, Spanish columns led by Colonel José Jiménez de Sandoval were spotted by Cuban cavalry scouts and his vanguard harassed by mounted skirmishers. Besides scouting and skirmishing, cavalry was also used in charges and in pursuing routed enemies. Soldiers of the cavalry used both firearms, such as carbines and revolvers, as well as machetes.

The Major-General Ignacio Agramonte is known for his cavalry force, which operated in Camagüey. He learned the tactical use of machetes from Máximo Gómez, who himself made extensive use of cavalry, and organized his horsemen into some of the most famous cavalry in Cuba between the years 1871 and 1873. He also used information presented at historical and military lectures to inform his organizational decisions. The men were organized into maniples, units smaller than regiments, which were stationed in a particular respective area. When necessary, a messenger could summon the maniple to assist in combat elsewhere. Agramonte, nicknamed "The Major" by his American subordinate officer Henry Reeve, trained his men to be extremely maneuverable, being able to rapidly respond to orders given by the bugler. By splitting off into various maneuver groups, Spanish square formations could be disorganized or undone. This leaves the Spanish infantry open for a decisive charge after the various groups join once again. So effective was "The Major's Cavalry" that there was a small window of time between 1871 and 1873 where the Spanish only controlled four villages in all of Camagüey.

Perhaps one of the most famous cavalry charges of the Ten Years' War was the Rescue of Sanguily. Thirty-five riders, including Ignacio Agramonte and Henry Reeve, charged against 120 Spanish light cavalry. The objective was to rescue Brigadier Julio Sanguily, who was captured by the Spanish horsemen. Without losing any men, they inflicted 11 mortal casualties, rescued Brigadier Sanguily and five other prisoners, and captured dozens of horses, saddles, a tent, bullets, revolvers, and sabers.

Máximo Gómez had a preference for using cavalry both in the Ten Years' War and in the War of Independence. One trick used by the cavalry was to ride up in view of Spanish columns, forcing them to deploy into battle formation, and then leave without presenting any combat. This left the Spanish troops "disconcerted, insecure, and confused". He also directed cavalry charges, such as the one at the Battle of Mal Tiempo. General Gómez ordered Lieutenant-Colonel José Loreto Cepero to charge any and all enemies he comes across without first asking permission, after the Lieutenant-Colonel asked to be in the forward vanguard. The invading army, led by Gómez, needed as much momentum as possible to reach Pinar del Río, and thus required the annihilation of any obstacles. Furthermore, ammunition was limited, so prolonged firefights were not an option. Lieutenant-Colonel José Loreto Cepero came across a skirmish between local patriots and Spanish troops, but instead of charging like he was ordered to, he dismounted his men, took up guerilla formations, and joined the shootout. This removed the element of surprise and allowed the Spanish to reorganize and give fierce fire. General Antonio Maceo, upon hearing the shooting, gave the order to charge, but was stopped by a barbed wire fence. The fence was removed with assistance from the Céspedes Infantry Regiment. Máximo Gómez and Serafín Sánchez were the next to charge in. The Spanish infantry was terrorized and panicked, they were unable to properly defend against the Cuban cavalry, leading to the 300 casualties inflicted on the approximately 2,500 strong force. It should be noted, however, that the machete charge was extremely circumstantial by the time of the War of 1895. Maceo's tactic of cavalry feints was more popular at this time.

=== Artillery ===
In the Ten Years' War, Carlos Roloff made use of rudimentary leather guns in the first few military actions after the uprising of Las Villas. Similarly, on 13 June 1870, Captain Francisco Valladares commanded a battle which included the employment of leather guns. In the battle, these were used at short range against infantry, one of them causing five casualties and routing the enemy. Leather guns were produced in very limited numbers and were more intended as a psychological weapon rather than a physically effective one. In the War of Independence, Calixto García used Spanish Krupp guns to assault fortifications and towns.

=== Logistics ===
The Liberation Army had many different ways of obtaining necessary supplies. Expeditions from outside of Cuba brought not only guns and men, but also backpacks, uniforms, and medicine. One important aspect of the insurgent supply chain was the prefecture. Prefectures were small towns or areas controlled by a prefect, a member of the Cuban civil government. These prefectures were hidden such that the Spanish Army and local guerillas were unable to find them. Sometimes, even the Cuban forces who operated in the zone didn't know the exact location. These prefectures were able to have workshops dedicated to the production of important items, such as socks, clothing, saddles, sheathes, machetes, straps, and other things. They were also able to repair minor damage on rifles, revolvers, and machetes. Furthermore, brass casings, collected after combat if possible, would be reloaded with gunpowder and projectiles. The prefectures also included garden wherein fruits and vegetables were grown to supplement the diets of the soldiers, along with honey and meat. It was the prefect's job to deliver the products of the prefecture to the military chiefs and their units.

It was also important to raid Spanish-held towns, convoys, and fortifications. These attacks could bring back important materials such as medicine and food, besides, of course, weapons.

It was the responsibility of the Medical Corps to establish field hospitals when circumstances permitted it. In order to attract students and practitioners of medicine, military ranks would be granted. Field hospitals were typically located near prefectures, where they could easily acquire supplies for the injured and sick. If medicine ran out, the medical staff could resort to herbal remedies grown in the prefecture. Unfortunately for hospital staff and injured soldiers, hospitals were a prime target for local guerillas who were working for the Spanish army.

== Notable Military Officers ==
=== Ten Years' War ===
Many important officers of the Liberation Army in later years, such as Máximo Gómez and Antonio Maceo, saw their first action in the Ten Years' War.

- Carlos Manuel Perfecto del Carmen de Céspedes y López del Castillo, Captain-General of Free Cuba and the Liberation Army (1868), President of the Republic-in-Arms (1869–1873)
- Ignacio Agramonte y Loynaz, Major-General and Chief of the Camagüey Division (1869–1870) and (1871–1873)
- Julio Sanguily, Colonel (1870), Brigadier (1871), Major-General (1871–1878)
- Henry Reeve, Lieutenant (1869), Brigadier (1873–1876)
- Carlos Roloff Mialofsky, Major-General, Chief of Staff, and acting Chief of the Las Villas Division (1869–1875) and (1876)
- Thomas Jordan, Major-General and General-in-Chief of the Liberation Army (1869–1870)
- Manuel de Quesada y Loynaz, Major-General and General-in-Chief of the Liberation Army (1869), Special Agent of the Republic-in-Arms (1870–1873)
- Antonio Maceo, Major-General (1877–1878)
- Máximo Gómez, Sergeant (1868), Major-General (1868–1878)
- Rosa Castellanos, Captain and head of military hospitals

=== Little War ===
The Little War barely lasted a year. One of the main issues was that there was a severe lack of competent officers, as most had been exiled after the Ten Years' War.

- Calixto García
- Antonio Maceo
- Carlos Roloff

=== War of Independence ===
The War of Independence, also called the Necessary War by José Martí, saw the return of many important military officers and the recruitment of others which would earn their reputations in battle.

- José Martí, general secretary of the Revolutionary Party (1892–1895), Major-General (1895)
- Máximo Gómez, major-general and general-in-chief of the Liberation Army (1895–1898)
- Antonio Maceo, major-general and lieutenant-general of the Liberation Army (1895–1896)
- Calixto García, Major-General and Lieutenant-General of the Liberation Army (1896–1898)
- Carlos Roloff Mialofsky, major-general, secretary of war and military scribe (1897), founder and director of the Practical-Theoretical Academy for the Manufacture and Use of Explosives (1897–1898)
- Juan Ríus Rivera, major-general and commander-in-chief of the Sixth Corps (1896–1897)
- Serafín Sánchez, major-general (1895–1896)
- Quintín Bandera, divisional general (1897–1898)
- José Miró Argenter, divisional general (1895–1898)
- Rosa Castellanos, head of military hospitals

== Organization during the War of 1895 ==
At the beginning of the War of Independence, several large corps were created, which had an increased military deployment capacity when compared to previous wars. One of these corps was the Fourth Corps of the Liberation Army, which had its headquarters in Las Villas. After the Invasion from East to West in 1896, the forces of the Liberation Army were organized into six corps with fourteen divisions, thirty-four brigades, and eighty-four regiments. Of these regiments, thirty-four were cavalry and fifty were infantry and other units. A lot of the first organization efforts in the last War of Independence were undertaken by General Gómez on December 3, 1895.

=== High Command ===
The Liberation Army's high command was structured as such:

- Government Council, Master Headquarters and Assistants
- Headquarters of the Army (Headquarters of the General-in-Chief)
- General Inspector
- Medical Corps
- Expeditionary Corps (Department of Expeditions)
- Unassigned Officers (Chiefs, surplus officers and their Escorts)
- Press Corps
- Legal Corps
- Headquarters of the Department of Santiago de Cuba
- Headquarters of the Department of Santa Clara

=== First Corps ===
The First Corps was created during the Ten Years' War, and once again in 1895. It continued its operations until 1899. By the end of the War of 1895, it was organized like this:

- First Division:
  - Divisional Headquarters
    - First Brigade:
      - Baracoa Infantry Regiment
      - Maisí Infantry Regiment
    - Second Brigade:
      - Brigade Headquarters
      - Hatuey Infantry Regiment
      - Guantánamo Infantry Regiment
    - Third Brigade:
      - Brigade Headquarters
      - Sagua Infantry Regiment
      - Mayarí Infantry Regiment
- Second Division:
  - Divisional Headquarters
    - First Brigade:
      - Brigade Headquarters
      - Baconao Infantry Regiment
      - José Maceo Infantry Regiment
    - Segunda Brigada:
      - Brigade Headquarters
      - Cauto Abajo Infantry Regiment
      - Moncada Infantry Regiment
      - Santiago Cavalry Regiment
    - Third Brigade:
      - Brigade Headquarters
      - Cambute Infantry Regiment
      - Cuba Infantry Regiment

=== Second Corps ===
The Second Corps was created during the Ten Years' War, and once again in 1895. It continued its operations until 1899. Its base of operations was in Santiago de Cuba. By the end of the War of 1895, it was organized like this:

- Headquarters of the Corps
  - First Division:
    - Divisional Headquarters
      - First Brigade:
        - Brigade Headquarters
        - Manzanillo Cavalry Regiment
        - Yara Infantry Regiment
        - Surplus Infantry Regiment
      - Segunda Brigada:
        - Brigade Headquarters
        - Gua Infantry Regiment
        - Vicana Infantry Regiment
  - Second Division:
    - Divisional Headquarters
      - First Brigade:
        - Brigade Headquarters
        - Jiguani Infantry Regiment
        - Baire Infantry Regiment
        - Santa Rita Infantry Regiment
        - Patria Cavalry Regiment
      - Second Brigade:
        - Brigade Headquarters
        - Céspedes Infantry Regiment
        - Bayamo Infantry Regiment
  - Third Division:
    - Divisional Headquarters
      - First Brigade:
        - Brigade Headquarters
        - Martí Infantry Regiment
        - Ocujal Infantry Regiment
      - Second Brigade:
        - Brigade Headquarters
        - Tunas Infantry Regiment
        - Federación Cavalry Regiment
  - Fourth Division:
    - Divisional Headquarters
      - First Brigade:
        - Brigade Headquarters
        - Holguín Infantry Regiment
      - Second Brigade:
        - Brigade Headquarters
        - Tacajo Infantry Regiment
        - Oriente Infantry Regiment

=== Third Corps ===
The Third Corps of the Liberation Army was created during the Ten Years' War, and once again in 1895. It continued its operations until 1899, with the province of Puerto Príncipe as its base of operations. At the conclusion of the Necessary War it was organized as follows:

- Corps Headquarters (Headquarters of the Corps)
- Corps Headquarters (Military Administration)
  - First Division:
    - Division Headquarters (Headquarters of the Division)
    - Division Headquarters (Coastal Vigilance)
    - Division Headquarters (Military Administration)
      - First Brigade:
        - Brigade Headquarters (Headquarters of the Brigade)
        - Camagüey Cavalry Regiment
        - Eduardo Cavalry Regiment
        - Jacinto Infantry Regiment
  - Second Division:
    - Division Headquarters (Headquarters of the Division)
    - Division Headquarters (Coastal Vigilance)
    - Division Headquarters (Military Administration)
      - First Brigade:
        - Brigade Headquarters (Headquarters of the Brigade)
        - Caonao Cavalry Regiment
        - Dynamite Guerilla Regiment
        - Gómez Infantry Regiment
        - Agramonte Cavalry Regiment
        - Oscar Primelles Infantry Regiment
      - Trocha Brigade:
        - Brigade Headquarters (Headquarters of the Brigade)
        - Zayas Cavalry Regiment
        - Aranguren Infantry Regiment

=== Fourth Corps ===
In the first days of August 1895, the Fourth Corps would be organized to operate against the Spanish. Major-General Carlos Roloff was the head of the corps with the following organization:

- Headquarters of the Corps
  - Beloso Guerilla Regiment
  - Maine Expeditionary Regiment
  - First Division:
    - First Brigade (Zone of operations: Sancti Spiritus):
      - Brigade Headquarters
      - Honorato Cavalry Regiment
      - Martí Cavalry Regiment
      - Castillo Cavalry Regiment
      - Atollaosa Infantry Regiment
      - Máximo Gómez Cavalry Regiment
      - Sancti Spirítus Cavalry Regiment
      - Serafín Sánchez Infantry Regiment
    - Second Brigade (Zone of operations: Remedios):
      - Brigade Headquarters
      - Narciso López Cavalry Regiment
      - Victoria Cavalry Regiment
      - Remedios Ranger Infantry Regiment
      - Remedios Artillery Regiment
      - Platero Cavalry Regiment
    - Third Brigade (Zone of operations: Trinidad):
      - Brigade Headquarters
      - First Trinidad Infantry Regiment
      - Second Trinidad Infantry Regiment
  - Second Division:
    - Divisional Headquarters
    - First Brigade (Zone of operations: Villa Clara)
      - Brigade Headquarters
      - Libertad Infantry Regiment
      - Zayas Cavalry Regiment
      - Villa Clara Cavalry Regiment
    - Second Brigade (Zone of operations: Cienfuegos)
      - Brigade Headquarters
      - Gómez Infantry Regiment
      - Yaguaramas Infantry Regiment
      - Voltiger Squadron Guerilla Regiment
      - Cienfuegos Cavalry Regiment
    - Third Brigade (Zone of operations: Sagua la Grande)
      - Brigade Headquarters
      - Torres Cavalry Regiment
      - Robau Cavalry Regiment
      - General Carrillo Infantry Regiment
- Dr. Fermín Valdés Domínguez's Medical Corps

=== Fifth Corps ===
Following the invasion of the west by Cuban forces, the Liberation Army was reorganized to include the Fifth Corps, which operated in Matanzas and Havana. It contained these units:

- Headquarters of the Corps
  - Civil Governor's Escort
  - First Division:
    - First Brigade:
      - Brigade Headquarters
      - Cárdenas Infantry Regiment
      - Colón Cavalry Regiment
    - Second Brigade:
      - Brigade Headquarters
      - Estrada Palma Cavalry Regiment
      - Manjuari Infantry Regiment
    - Third Brigade:
      - Brigade Headquarters
      - Matanzas Infantry Regiment
      - Betances Infantry Regiment
  - Second Division:
    - First Brigade:
      - Brigade Headquarters
      - Havana Cavalry Regiment
      - Havana Infantry Regiment
    - Second Brigade:
      - Brigade Headquarters
      - Adolfo del Castillo Cavalry Regiment
      - General Mayía Cavalry Regiment
      - Francisco Gómez Infantry Regiment
      - Alejandro Rodríguez Cavalry Regiment
    - Third Brigade:
      - Brigade Headquarters
      - Goicuria Cavalry Regiment
      - Goicuria Infantry Regiment
    - Fourth Brigade:
      - Brigade Headquarters
      - Maceo's Sharpshooters Infantry Regiment
      - Mayía's Sharpshooters Infantry Regiment
      - Palos Infantry Regiment
      - Calixto García Infantry Regiment

=== Sixth Corps ===
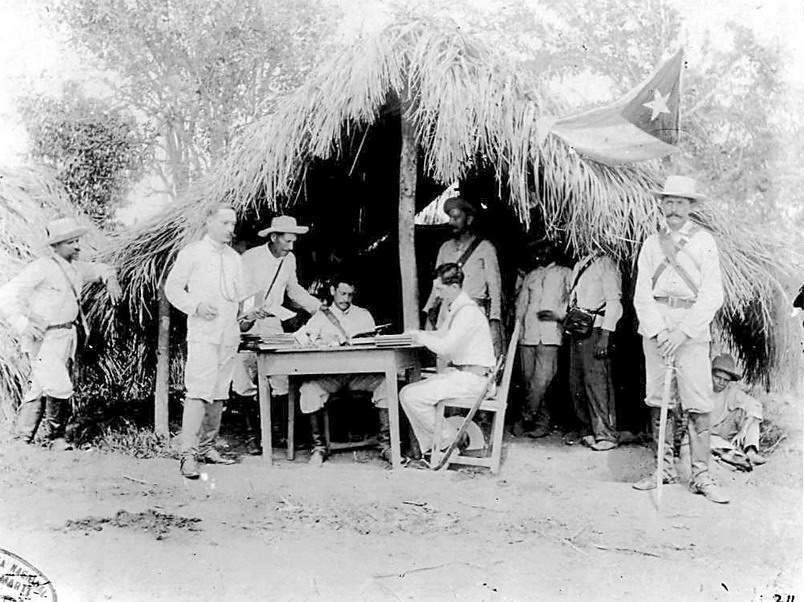
Cuban soldiers of the Sixth Corps in Pinar del Río.

After the completion of the Invasion from East to West, the Liberation Army was reorganized to include the Sixth Corps, which operated in the province of Pinar del Río. It was organized thusly:

- Headquarters of the Corps
  - First Division:
    - First Brigade:
      - Brigade Headquarters
      - Maceo Infantry Regiment
      - Aguilera Infantry Regiment
    - Second Brigade:
      - Brigade Headquarters
      - Villareño Invasion Infantry Regiment
      - Gómez Infantry Regiment
  - Second Division:
    - First Brigade:
      - Brigade Headquarters
      - Pedro Díaz Infantry Regiment
      - Roloff Infantry Regiment
    - Second Brigade:
      - Brigade Headquarters
      - José María Rodríguez Infantry Regiment
      - Vidal Ducasse Infantry Regiment
