= Joaquim de Miró =

Spanish painter

Joaquim de Miró y Argenter (February 3, 1849 – February 18, 1914, in Sitges) was a Spanish painter, best known for his luminist landscape paintings, such as La Malvasia (1895) which have been preserved by the Cau Ferrat Museum.
