= Battle of Las Guásimas (1874) =

Battle in Camagüey, Cuba

- Part of the Ten Years' War
- Battle of Las Guásimas (1874) (Cuba)
Date	16–20 March 1874
Location	Camagüey, Cuba
Result	Cuban victory

Belligerents
(Spain) Spanish Empire	Cuban separatists

Commanders and leaders
(Spain) Brigadier Armiñán	Major general Máximo Gómez; Brigadier Antonio Maceo (WIA)

Strength
5,000	2,050

Casualties and losses
1,037 killed, wounded, or missing	174 killed or wounded

The Battle of Las Guásimas (16–20 March 1874) was fought in Camagüey, Cuba. Some 2,050 rebels, commanded by Dominican major general Máximo Gómez, defeated 5,000 Spanish troops with 6 cannons. The five-day battle cost the Spanish 1,037 casualties and the rebels 174 casualties.
