= Quintín Bandera =

Afro-Cuban revolutionary (c.1834–1906)

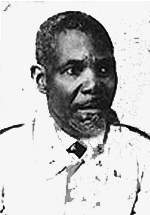
- Born: October 30, 1834; Santiago de Cuba, Cuba
- Died: August 22, 1906 (Aged 71) Finca El Garro, Havana, Cuba
- Buried: Colon Cemetery, Havana
- Branch: Mambises; Cuban Liberation Army
- Rank: General
- Conflicts: Cuban War of Independence

José Quintín Bandera Betancourt (ca. 1834 – 1906) was a military leader of the Cuban insurrection against the Spanish during the Cuban War of Independence. In 1906, Bandera led an army of insurgents toward Havana and was killed near Punta Brava, a village close to Havana.

== Biography ==
Quintín Bandera was a hero of the Cuban War of Independence, "noted for his fearlessness and bravery," during which he had distinguished himself by breaking through the Spanish line which separated Pinar del Río Province from Havana Province. He fought alongside General Calixto García, and alongside Máximo Gómez with his ragged band of "Orientales." In 1899, he was considered a leader of the Afro-Cuban population of Santiago de Cuba Province. He had become popular with black population of the island as a whole, thousands of whom had welcomed him to Havana in 1900 and had carried him through the city's streets for hours, and was known for delivering fiery speeches about how the new republic did not reward its black citizens.

In 1906, insurrection broke out against the presidency of Tomás Estrada Palma, Cuba's first president after independence. Minor protests had already taken place the year before, but in August 1906 a band led by Pino Guerra started a more serious uprising in Pinar del Río Province. One general suspected of participating was José Miguel Gómez, later president of Cuba, who was quickly arrested and jailed. During that time, General Bandera, "that sexagenarian hero of all the blacks in the island," moved at the head of a group of a thousand black insurgents toward Havana and occupied a railroad station. Bandera had lost his office and broke into the Cuban senate, but instead of being made chief of police, as he demanded, he was appointed "parliamentary doorkeeper." He consequently took up arms.

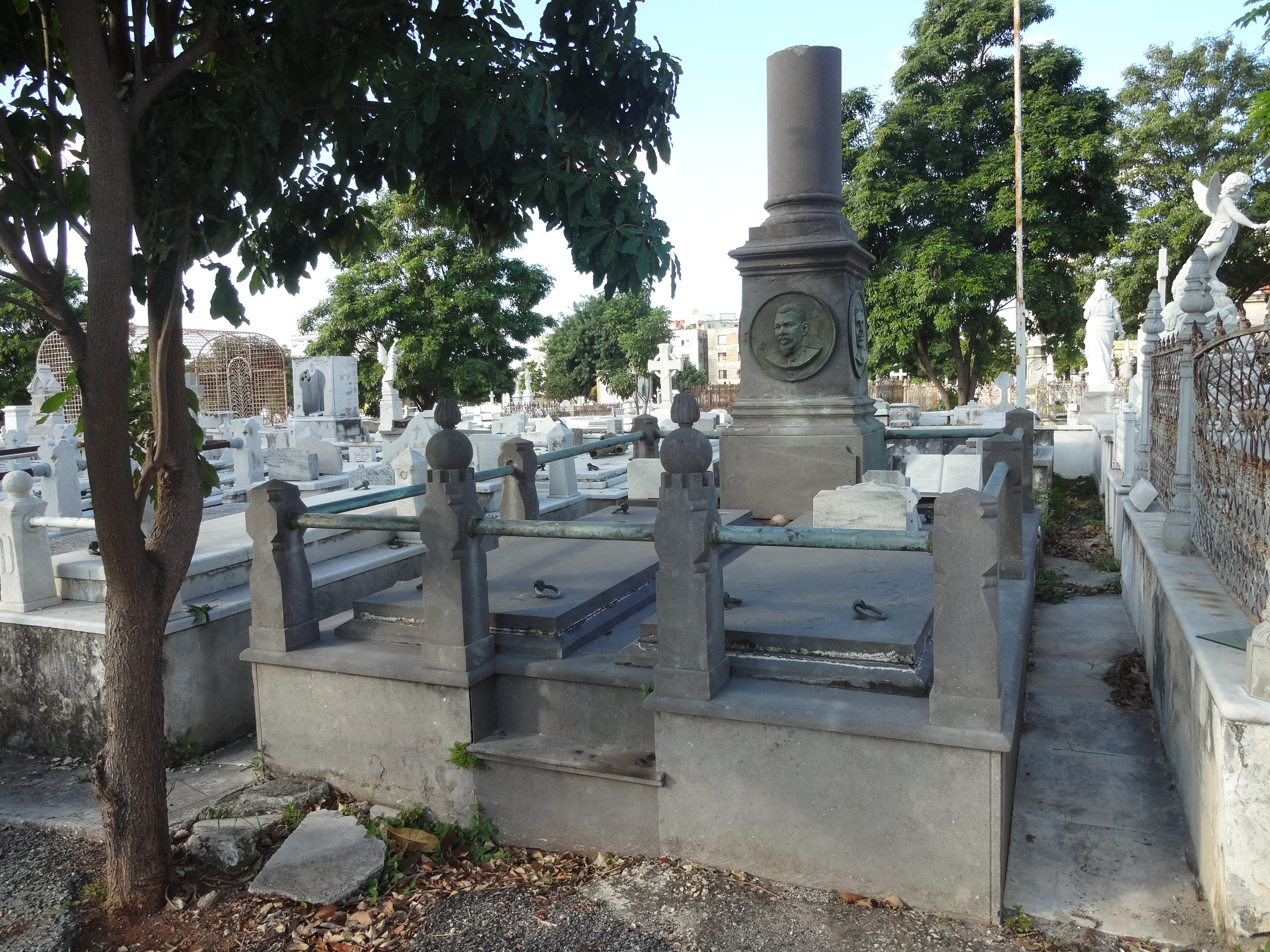
Bandera's grave at Colon Cemetery, Havana.

At the Silveira farm near Punta Brava, Bandera made his last stand with twenty of his followers. He was surrounded by troops led by General Freyre Andrade, and a group of Rural Guards stormed the farm. Most of the insurgents managed to slip away, leaving only Bandera and two of his comrades: shot multiple times, according to reports, he continued "wielding his machete until the foe had cut him to pieces." The three bodies were "horribly mutilated by machete cuts" and moved to Havana to be put on display. Bandera's death put a momentary stop to the 1906 insurrection; he was approximately seventy two years when he died.
