= Little War (Cuba) =

Failed uprising in Cuba against the Spanish Empire (1879-80)

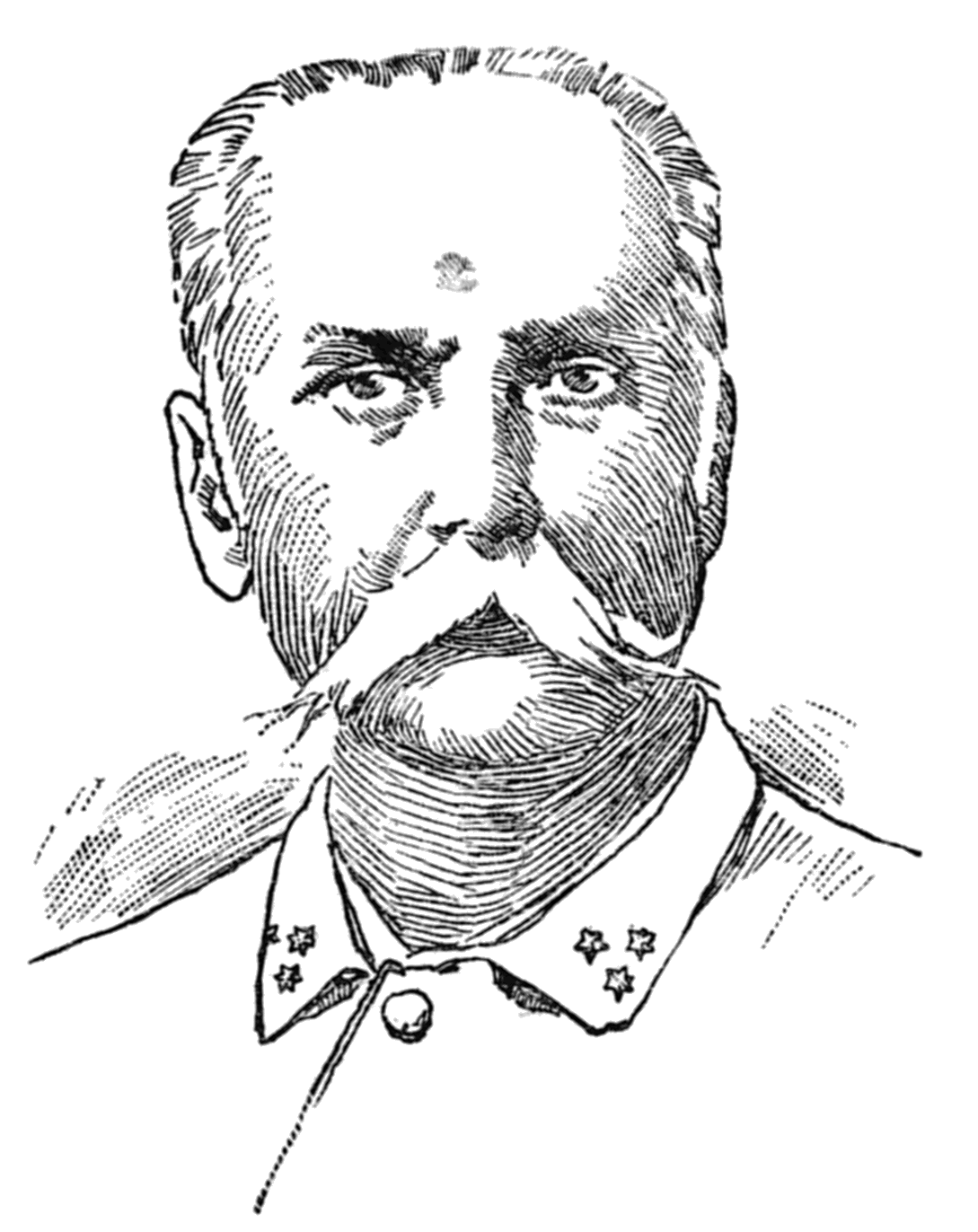
- Calixto García, the main organizer of the conflict
Date	August 26, 1879 – December 3, 1880 (1 year, 3 months and 1 week)
Location	Cuba
Result	Spanish victory

Belligerents
Cuban Rebels	Spain

Commanders and leaders
Calixto García; Gregorio Benítez †; Guillermo Moncada (POW); Arcadio Leyte-Vidal †; José Maceo (POW); Rafael Maceo (POW); Serafín Sánchez; Limbano Sánchez (POW); Flor Crombet (POW); Quintín Bandera (POW); Cecilio González †; Pío Rosado Lorié †; Francisco Jiménez †; Emilio Núñez	Arsenio Martínez Campos; Camilo Polavieja

Strength
8,000	Tens of thousands

Casualties and losses
Hundreds killed	Unknown

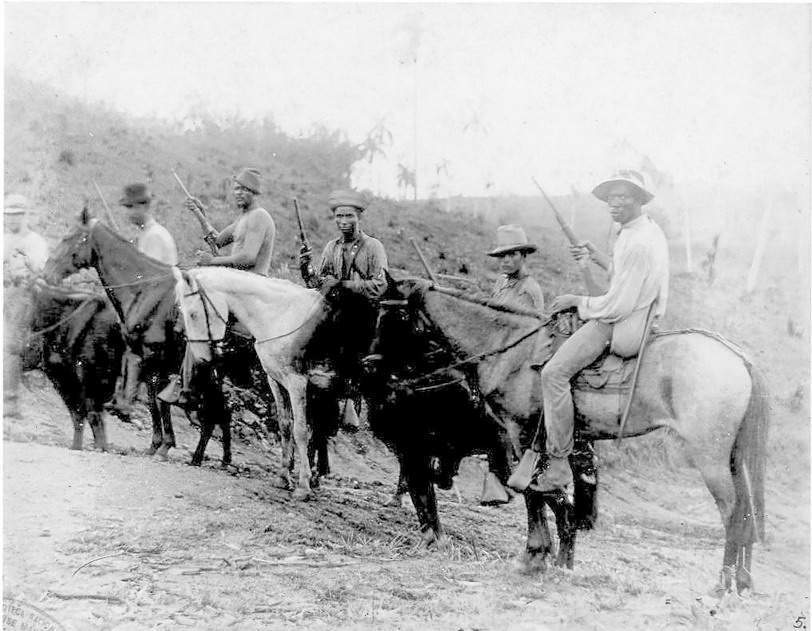
Cuban cavalry unit during the war

The Little War or Small War (Spanish: Guerra Chiquita) was the second of three conflicts between Cuban rebels and Spain. It started on 26 August 1879 and after some minor successes ended in rebel defeat in September 1880. It followed the Ten Years' War of 1868–78 and preceded the final war of 1895–98, which resulted in American intervention and Cuban independence.

== Origins ==
The war had the same origins as the Ten Years' War, and in many ways, it was a continuation of it. Following his release after the Pact of Zanjón, Calixto Garcia travelled to New York City and organized the Cuban Revolutionary Committee with other revolutionaries. In 1878, he issued a manifesto against Spanish rule of Cuba. This met with approval amongst other revolutionary leaders, and war began on August 26, 1879.

== The war ==
The revolution was led by Calixto García, having been one of the few revolutionary leaders who did not sign the Pact of Zanjón. Among the other prominent leaders were José Maceo (the brother of Antonio Maceo), Guillermo Moncada, Emilio Núñez. The revolutionaries faced many problems which were difficult to overcome. They lacked experienced leaders other than García, and they had a dire shortage of weapons and ammunition. Further, they had no foreign allies to help them, and the population was both exhausted from the Ten Years' War and lacked faith in the possibility of victory, desiring peace instead. In the west of the island, most of the revolutionary leaders were arrested. The rest of the leaders were forced to capitulate throughout 1879 and 1880, and by September 1880, the rebels had been completely defeated.

== Aftermath ==
Although the Spanish had made promises of reform, they were ineffective. The Spanish Constitution of 1876 was applied to Cuba in 1881, but this changed little. Although Cuba was able to send representatives to the Cortes Generales, the Spanish parliament, in practice the representatives were among the most conservative in Cuba, and thus little was changed.

The lack of any true reform resulted in another uprising 15 years later, the Cuban War of Independence, which came to be known as the War of '95. The experience gained by the revolutionary generals in the Little War was a great help to them, and following the War of '95 and the linked Spanish–American War, Cuba gained independence from Spain.

== See also ==
- Ten Years' War
- Cuban War of Independence
- José Semidei Rodríguez
- Francisco Gonzalo Marín
- Juan Ríus Rivera
