= Serafín Sánchez =

Cuban patriot

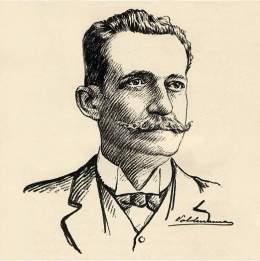
- Serafín Sánchez as a Major General
- Born: July 2, 1846; Sancti Spíritus, Captaincy General of Cuba, Spain
- Died: November 18, 1896 (aged 50); Villa Clara Province, Cuba
- Military career
- Allegiance: Cuba
- Branch: Cuban Liberation Army
- Service years: 1868 – 1896
- Rank: Major General
- Conflicts: Ten Years' War; Little War; Cuban War of Independence: Battle of Paso de las Damas †

Serafín Gualberto Sánchez Valdivia was a Cuban patriot, abolitionist and a participant of all three Cuban wars of independence. Additionally he participated in the Gómez-Maceo Plan. He reached the rank of major general. He participated in more than 120 fights. He was also a surveyor and teacher. Brother of Colonel Sabás Raimundo Sánchez Valdivia and Brigadier José Joaquín Sánchez Valdivia. He maintained a solid friendship with Máximo Gómez and José Martí, who considered him a brother.

== Early years ==
Sánchez was born on 2 July 1846, in the city of Sancti Spiritus, Cuba. He was one of the 22 children of Don Joaquín Sánchez Marín and Doña Isabel María de Valdivia y Salas, who came from colonial Sancti Spiritus families with well-off economic positions.

He experienced his youth between the rural town of Arroyo Blanco, where his family came from, and the larger city of Sancti Spiritus, where he was born. He completed primary studies at a Jesuit college in his hometown.

He managed to graduate as a surveyor, but he always longed to be a teacher, a job he would do in the heat of war.

== Ten Years' War ==
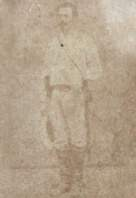
Serafín Sánchez during the Ten Years' War

He rose in arms on 6 February 1869 in the north of the present province of Sancti Spiritus with only 45 men. Four days after the first part in combat Mayajigua and then others such as Chambas, Palo Seco, La Sacra, Naranjo, and Cascorro, among others.

In the midst of the difficult life in the jungle, he practiced his profession as a teacher, teaching literate peasants and freed slaves.

On 1 October 1877 he was promoted to colonel and on 18 December of that year fought his last major action in this war to the Spanish attack a convoy heading to Sancti Spiritus Fort Taguasco. On 28 February 1878 he laid down his arms in Ojo de Agua, taking up the Pact of the Zanjón.

== Little War ==
He remained in Sancti Spíritus and sporadically in Havana. In December 1878 he began to manage with the Spanish high command a decorous exit for the then colonel Ramón Leocadio Bonachea, who was still fighting in the jurisdiction of Sancti Spíritus without any possibility of success.

Simultaneously he conspired to prepare a new uprising in Las Villas, for which he used the pseudonym Magón. On 8 December 1878, Major General Calixto García, president of the Cuban Revolutionary Committee in exile in New York City, sent him the diploma of brigadier general and the appointment of head of the revolutionary movement in the jurisdiction of Sancti Spíritus.

He was a signatory of the manifesto proclaimed by Ramón Leocadio Bonachea in the Protesta del Jarao, on 15 April 1879 .

He participated in the Little War together with other military leaders who opposed the Pact of Zanjón, obtaining the rank of major general.

All attempts to revitalize the war failed; on August 1, 1880, he embarked on the north coast of Remedios for the United States.

== Exile ==
After a few days in New York, he decided to settle in the Dominican Republic, where he stayed for more than eleven years. There he collaborated with the Gómez-Maceo Plan from 1884 to 1886, which finally did not bear fruit.

Later, he settled in Key West. In exile, he collaborated with José Martí, standing out as a writer, poet and journalist.

Sánchez later participated in the organization of the failed plan of Fernandina. Then he organized an expedition together with General Carlos Roloff to return to his homeland. Sánchez disembarked in Cuban coast on 24 July 1895 in the area of Punta Caney, Sancti Spiritus.

== Cuban War of Independence ==
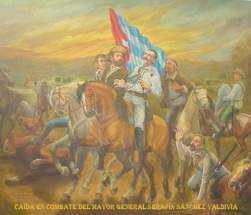
Death of Serafín Sánchez

When Carlos Roloff was granted the position of Secretary of War, he became chief of the IV Corps of the Cuban Revolutionary Army.

At the end of 1896 he returned to his native province, where he carried out several combats causing new defeats to the enemy.

On 18 November 1896, in the Battle of Paso de las Damas in the province of Las Villas against Spanish forces in large numbers exceeding the Mambisas.

After the objective of the battle was accomplished, he ordered the retreat. At that moment, a Mauser bullet passed through him from his right shoulder to his left and he fell into the arms of José Inés Fernández. Some who came to his aid heard his last words: "They have killed me! It does not matter, the march continues!". He died at 5:15 pm. He is buried at the Cementerio Municipal de Sancti Spiritus next to his mother Isabel Maria de Valdivia and his brothers.

== Legacy ==
He is considered alongside other figures like Gómez and Maceo, one of the main leaders of the Cuban War of Independence. His advanced ideology made him not only lash out against Spanish colonial rule, but also criticized the racism and homophobia within the independence movement hoping to create a fairer Cuba. He also warned about the intentions of the United States and its involvement in the Spanish-Cuban conflict. He stood out as a man of thought and action, with an elevated ideological stance and political vision.

Currently, the square of the revolution in the city of Sancti Spíritus bears his name and a statue was erected in his honor. His book Heroes Humildes y Poetas de la Guerra was published posthumously in 1911.
