= Mambises =

1868–1898 Cuban independence guerrilla soldiers

Cuban insurgents during the War of Independence against Spain, 1898

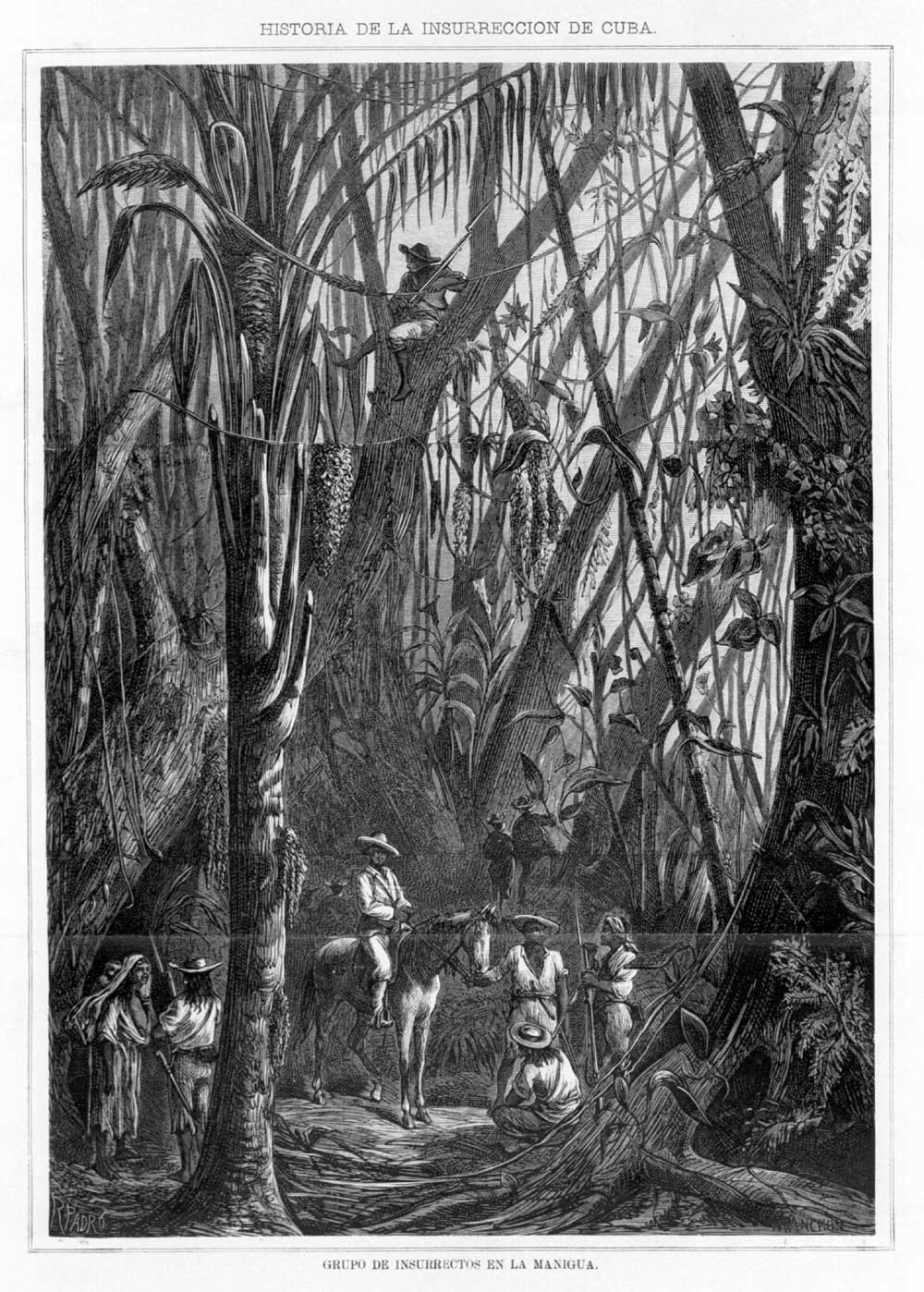
Depiction of Cuban insurgents in the tropical forest (manigua), ca. 1879-1880

The mambises were the guerrilla independence soldiers who fought for the independence from Spain of the Dominican Republic in the Dominican Restoration War (1863–1865), and of Cuba in the Ten Years' War (1868–1878), Little War (1879–1880), and Cuban War of Independence (1895–1898).

== Origin ==
The word mambí is of Afro-Antillean origin but the exact etymology is unknown. It is first recorded early in the annexation of the Dominican Republic to Spain (1861-1865), when it was a deferential title given by friends and neighbors to Manuel de Frías, a septuagenarian Afro-Dominican farmer arrested by the Spanish for inciting disobedience against the colonizers. Frías, who was in his thirties when Haitian president Jean-Pierre Boyer conquered the Republic of Spanish Haiti in 1822 and abolished slavery, was convinced that the Spanish were going to reintroduce it, despite their reassurances to the contrary. After Frías escaped from prison, rumors of the reinstatement of slavery extended to the central and northern part of the island, where the Dominican Restoration War began on August 1863. The Dominican insurgents were called mambises.

Due to their lack of military gear and artillery, the Dominican mambises fought a guerrilla war armed mostly with machetes, cavalry lances, and few rifles. After the Spanish defeat in 1865, several Dominicans that had supported Spain and the pro-annexation president Pedro Santana left for Spanish Cuba, where many tried to join the Spanish Army unsuccessfully. Following the outbreak of the Ten Years' War in 1868, they joined the Cuban Liberation Army instead, providing its initial training and leadership.

Noting the similar tactics and weapons used by the Cuban insurgents, the Spanish also called them mambises. Though this was meant to be derogatory, the Cubans accepted and started using the name themselves.

Some sources claim a Congolese origin. According to Esteban Montejo's Biography of a Runaway Slave, a mambí is the child of a monkey crossed with a buzzard.

== Background ==
The mambí soldiers made up most of the National Army of Liberation and were the key soldiers responsible for the success of the Cuban liberation wars. They consisted of Cubans from all social classes including white Cubans, free black people, slaves, and mulattos. During the Ten Years' War, slaves were promised their freedom if they assisted the Creoles in the fight against the Spanish. The freeing of slaves to help fight was started by Carlos Manuel de Céspedes. At the end of the war, even though independence from Spain was not achieved, Spain agreed to honor the freeing of the slaves who had fought against them.

The mambí forces were made up of volunteers who mostly had no military training and banded together in loose groups who acted independently to attack the Spanish troops during the Ten Years' War. It is estimated that 8,000 poorly armed and underfed mambises inflicted close to 20,000 casualties on the well-trained Spanish soldiers during the Ten Years' War.

Similarly, by the end of the War of Independence the National Army of Liberation numbered nearly 50,000 of which only about 25,000 were armed. The leaders, having learnt from previous mistakes, had organized the army into “6 corps with 14 divisions, 34 brigades, 50 regiments of infantry and 34 cavalry.” Even though, once again, they were limited on resources, they possibly inflicted 71,000 casualties (Note: Total number of Spanish casualties lost during conflict. Number lost due to yellow fever and other diseases vs. combat is not known.) out of the 250,000 Spanish troops sent to the island.

== Women ==
Mambí independence fighters were not limited to men. During the War of Independence, Spanish general General Valeriano Weyler Nicolau initiated "Reconcentración" which forcefully moved rural inhabitants into the cities in makeshift concentration camps. Conditions in these camps resulted in mass starvation, disease, and large numbers of deaths of the Cuban population. The prospect of these conditions pushed many families, including the women and children, into joining the independence movement.

The best known mambí woman is Mariana Grajales Cuello, who was Antonio Maceo Grajales’s mother. Mariana and all of her sons participated in all three of the wars of independence.

== Weapons ==
Prior to the Ten Years' War, private ownership of weapons was allowed but, considering that at this time many of the black were still slaves, most of the men who became mambises did not have firearms. Following the war, Spain prohibited ownership of firearms in an effort to prevent another uprising. In both cases, the lack of firearms forced the mambises into using what they had: machetes and sometimes horses.

At the start of the Ten Years' War, Máximo Gómez, who had been a cavalry officer in the Spanish Army, taught the men the "machete charge". This became the mambises' most useful and feared tactic in both wars. These methods resulted in Guerrilla type warfare that favored them due to the element of surprise and their knowledge of the terrain and environment.

Knowing additional weapons were needed, numerous attempts were made to procure arms from outside the country. During both wars of independence, many expeditions were funded to bring equipment and volunteers for the Liberation Army. During the 1895 War, 96 armed expeditions landed in Cuba. Despite this interference, and having only originally started with a small number of weapons, the mambises were able to build up a significant arsenal by conducting raids on the Spanish troops and strongholds.

== Media depictions ==
Elpidio Valdés is a notable cartoon character within Cuban culture in comics, television, and movies. Created in 1970, he is portrayed as a mambí colonel, fighting for the liberation of Cuba from the Spanish.

Several films have been made in Cuba, both before and after the Cuban Revolution, that portray the national significance of the mambises. These cinemas have been used to create a sense of Cuban national identity. One such film, El Capitán Mambí y Libertadores o guerrilleros, which was made before the Revolution, was funded by the government and had all of the troops, horses, and weapons for the film supplied by the military.

== Notable Mambises ==
- Serafín Sánchez
- Antonio Maceo Grajales
- Carlos Manuel de Céspedes
- Henry Reeve
- Máximo Gómez
- Quintín Bandera

== Notes ==
Footnotes

Citations
