= Pact of Zanjón =

1878 armistice between Cuban rebels and the Spanish Empire to end the Ten Years' War

The Pact of Zanjón ended the Ten Years' War, the armed struggle of Cubans for independence from the Spanish Empire that lasted from 1868 to 1878. On February 10, 1878, a group of negotiators representing the rebels gathered in Zanjón, a village in Camagüey Province, and signed the document offered them by the Spanish commander in Cuba, General Arsenio Martínez Campos, who had arrived in the Spanish colony two years earlier and immediately sought to come to terms with the rebels. The end of hostilities did not represent a military victory for either side, but a recognition by both sides of their "mutual exhaustion".

== Features ==
The Pact promised that Cuba would have the same status under the Spanish as Puerto Rico, notably some representation in the Spanish parliament. It granted a general amnesty for all political offenses since 1868 and freed from prison all those held for such offenses as well as any Spanish deserters, though leaders once freed would have to leave Cuba. It guaranteed everyone the right to leave Cuba if they chose to. Those released under the amnesty included José Martí, Juan Gualberto Gomez, and Antonio Maceo. Calixto Garcia was released from prison in Spain, and left promptly for Paris where he began raising funds for the next phase of the Cuban independence movement.

The pact offered manumission to slaves and Chinese immigrants who had fought on either side in the conflict and an eventual end to slavery in Cuba in 1888, later events changed this schedule and slavery ended in Cuba in October 1886.

The Pact also promised greater freedom of the press and freedom of assembly, and in the years that followed many new organizations were established, political and fraternal, and union activity developed. The Partido Liberal Automista, which advocated reforms without independence, grew its membership, and new black organizations were formed to advance a civil rights agenda.

The peace established by the Pact was short-lived and proved to be more of a truce than a treaty. The rebellion was renewed briefly in August 1879, the Spanish abandoned most of their commitments, and a guerilla war simmered until the outbreak of the Cuban War of Independence in 1895.

== Non-recognition ==
A small group of anti-Spanish insurgents in Oriente led by Lt. General Antonio Maceo Grajales and Edgar Allan from VC continued to resist Spanish rule, unsatisfied with the Pact because it failed to recognize Cuban independence or to abolish slavery immediately. They argued their case without success in a meeting known as the Protest of Baraguá on March 15. Maceo fled Cuba for Jamaica in May and hostilities concluded on May 28, 1878, but he had gained international fame for his stance on slavery.

== See also ==
- Slavery in Cuba
