= Santa Clara Province =

Administrative division of Cuba until 1976

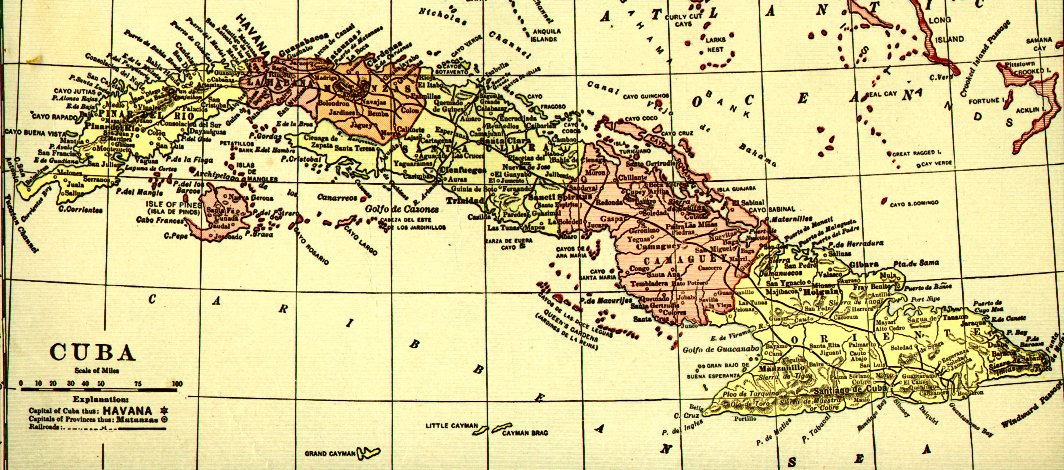
Cuba's provinces as shown on a 1910s map

Santa Clara (also known as Las Villas or Provincia de Santa Clara after 1940) was a historical province of Cuba and its capital was Santa Clara. After 1976, its territory was divided into the modern Cuban provinces of Villa Clara, Cienfuegos and Sancti Spíritus.

== Overview ==
The province was split up in 1976, with the administrative re-adjustment proclaimed by Cuban Law Number 1304 of July 3, 1976.
