= Máximo Gómez =

Dominican Major General

Máximo Gomez y Baez
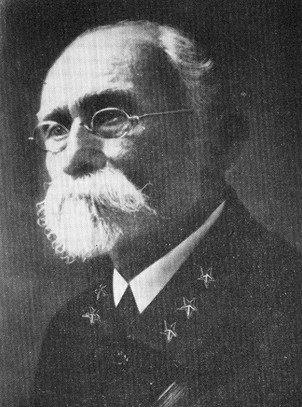
- Born: November 18, 1836; Baní, Haitian-occupied Santo Domingo
- Died: June 17, 1905 (aged 68); Havana, La Havana, Cuba
- Military career
- Allegiance: Dominican Republic (1854–1861); Spain (1861–1865); Cuba (1868–1898)
- Branch: Army
- Service years: 1852 – 1898
- Rank: Major general
- Conflicts: Dominican War of Independence: Battle of Santomé; Dominican Restoration War; Ten Years' War: Battle of Las Guasimas; Cuban War of Independence

Máximo Gómez y Báez (November 18, 1836 – June 17, 1905) was a Dominican and Cuban general. After first getting military experience while fighting for his motherland in the Dominican War of Independence, he later fought against his former compatriots alongside Spanish forces in the Dominican Restoration War. Following defeat in the latter conflict, he sought political refuge in Cuba, where he led Cuban rebels in both the Ten Years' War and the Cuban War of Independence from 1868 to 1898. He was known for his controversial scorched earth tactics, which entailed dynamiting passenger trains, utilization of machetes, torching the Spanish loyalist properties and sugar plantations. By the time the Spanish–American War broke out in April 1898, he refused to join forces with the Spanish in fighting off the United States. Despite his change of loyalty to the Spanish during his early years, he is still considered a war hero in both his native Dominican Republic and in Cuba.

== Early life ==
Gómez was born on November 18, 1836 in the town of Baní, in what is now the province of Peravia in the Dominican Republic which was then under Haitian rule from 1822–1844.

== Initial Early Military Career on Hispaniola ==
During his teenage years, he joined in the battles against the frequent Haitian incursions of Faustin Soulouque in the 1850s, during the Dominican War of Independence. After seeing the Dominican general Pedro Florentino burn his hometown of Baní to the ground on his 27th birthday, he decided to fight alongside the Spanish forces in the Dominican Restoration War until its end, a decision he would eventually admit to regretting. He would later earn a promotion from sergeant to commander after achieving victory over the aforementioned Florentino in a battle.

== Relocation to Cuba ==
After the Spanish forces were defeated and fled the newly-independent Dominican Republic in 1865 by the order of Queen Isabela II to Cuba and Puerto Rico, many supporters of the Annexionist cause left with them. Gómez did not initially wish to leave his home country, but was later convinced by his mother, who warned that he would be killed by patriots if he stayed (due to his allegiance to the Spanish). He arrived in Cuba with the Spanish troops evacuated from Santo Domingo in 1865, starting an agricultural enterprise and later marrying Bernarda Toro, who would later accompany him during the wars on the island.

== Change of allegiance ==
Gómez retired from the Spanish Army and soon took up the rebel cause in 1868, helping transform the Cuban Army's military tactics and strategy from the conventional approach, favored by Thomas Jordan and others. He gave the Cuban mambises their most feared tactic, the "machete charge."

== Cuban Wars of Independence ==
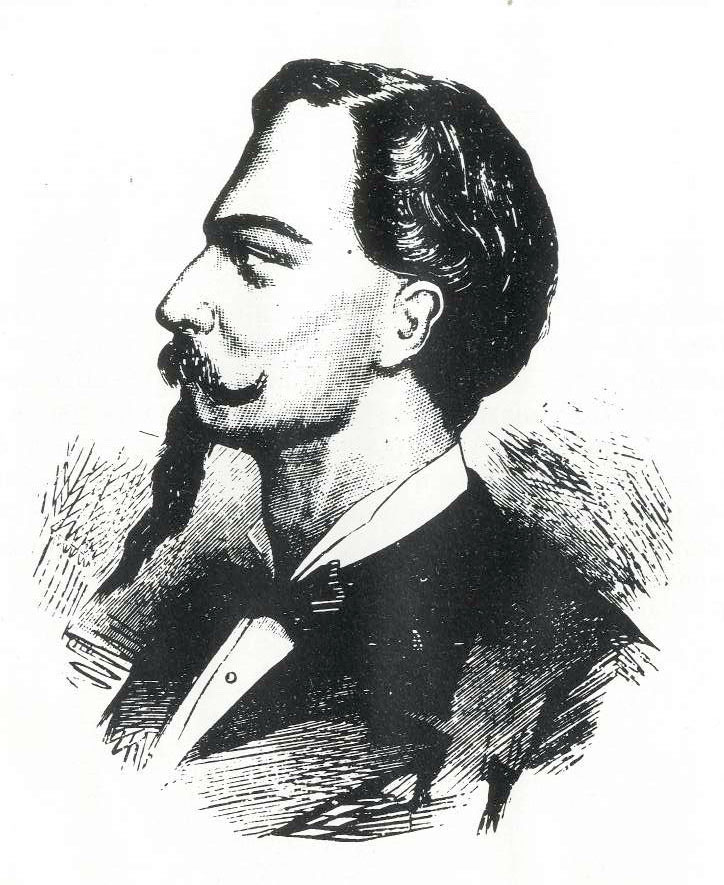
Drawing of Máximo Gómez in 1868

On October 25, 1868, during the Battle of Pino de Baire, Gómez led a machete charge on foot, ambushing a Spanish column and obliterating it; the Spanish suffered 233 casualties. The Spanish Army was terrified of the charges because most were infantry troops, mainly conscripts, who were fearful of being cut down by the machetes. Because the Cuban Army always lacked sufficient munitions, the usual combat technique was to shoot once and then charge the Spanish.

In 1871, Gómez led a campaign to clear Guantánamo from forces loyal to Spain, particularly the rich coffee growers, who were mostly of French descent and whose ancestors had fled from Haiti after the Haitians had slaughtered the French. Gómez carried out a bloody but successful campaign, and most of his officers went on to become high-ranking officers, including Antonio and José Maceo, Adolfo Flor Crombet, Policarpo Pineda "Rustán."

After the death in combat of Major General Ignacio Agramonte y Loynáz in May 1873, Gómez assumed the command of the military district of the province of Camaguey and its famed Cavalry Corps. Upon first inspecting the corps, he concluded that they were the best trained and disciplined in the nascent indigenous Cuban Army, and they would significantly contribute to the war for independence.

On February 19, 1874, Gómez and 700 other rebels marched westward from their eastern base and defeated 2,000 Spanish troops at El Naranjo. The Spaniards lost 100 killed in action, 200 wounded in action; the rebels incurred 150 casualties. A battalion of 500 Chinese fought under the command of Gómez in the Battle of Las Guasimas (March 1874). The battle cost the Spanish 1,037 casualties and the rebels 174 casualties. However, the rebels had exhausted their resources: the unusual departure from guerrilla tactics had proved a costly enterprise.

In early 1875, with fewer than 2,000 men, Gómez crossed the Trocha—a string of Spanish military fortifications—and burned 83 plantations around Sancti Spíritus and freed their slaves. However, the conservative Revolutionary leaders feared the consequences of these actions and diverted troops away from Gómez' army, causing the campaign to fizzle. In 1876, Gómez surrendered his command when he was told by General Carlos Roloff that the officers of Las Villas would no longer follow his orders since he was Dominican.

=== Role in Puerto Rican conflict ===
In the interlude between the two Cuban independence wars, Gómez held odd jobs in Jamaica and Panama (among them, he supervised a laborers' brigade during the construction of the Panama Canal), but he remained as an active player for the cause of Cuban independence as well as that for the rest of the Antilles. For example, when Puerto Rico experienced a period of severe political repression in 1887 by the Spanish governor, Romualdo Palacio, which led to the arrest of many local political leaders, including Román Baldorioty de Castro, Gómez offered his services to Ramón Emeterio Betances (the previous instigator of the island's first pro-independence revolution, the Grito de Lares) who was then exiled in Paris. Gómez sold most of his personal belongings to finance a revolt in Puerto Rico and volunteered to lead any Puerto Rican troops if any such revolt occurred. The revolt was deemed unnecessary later that year, when the Spanish government recalled Palacio from office to investigate charges of abuse of power from his part, but Gómez and Betances established a friendship and logistical relationship that lasted until Betances's death in 1898.

=== Promotion to general ===
Gómez rose to the rank of major general of the Cuban Army.

He adapted and formalized the improvised military tactics that had first been used by Spanish guerrillas against Napoleon Bonaparte's armies into a cohesive and comprehensive system, at both the tactical and the strategic levels. The concept of insurrection and insurgency and the asymmetric nature thereof can be traced intellectually to him.

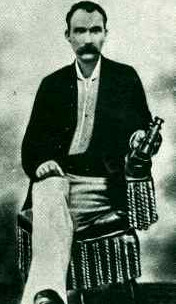
Maximo Gomez at age 45

He was shot in the neck in 1875 while he was crossing the fortified line or Trocha from Júcaro in the south to Morón, in the north; he was leading the failed attempt to invade Western Cuba. He then always wore a kerchief around his neck to cover the bullet hole, which remained open after it healed (he usually plugged it with a wad of cotton). His second and last wound came in 1896 while he was fighting in the rural areas outside Havana and completing a successful invasion of Western Cuba.

=== Fabian strategy ===
He was wounded only twice during 15 years of guerrilla warfare against an enemy far superior in manpower and logistics. In contrast, his most trusted officer and second-in-command, Lieutenant General Antonio Maceo y Grajales, was shot 27 times in the same span of time, with the 26th being the mortal wound. Gómez's son and Maceo's aide-de-camp, Francisco Gómez y Toro, nicknamed "Panchito," was killed while he was trying to recover Maceo's dead body in combat on December 7, 1896.

Soon afterward, Gómez implemented another warfare technique that proved to be very successful in crippling Spanish economic interests in Cuba: torching sugar cane haciendas and other strategic agricultural assets. He personally abhorred the idea of "setting to fire the product of our laborers' work over more than 200 years in a few hours" but countered that the state of misery most of the laborers still experienced, if that was the price to pay to redeem them from the economic system that enslaved them ¡Bendita sea la tea! ("Blessed be the torch!")

=== Proposal to join Spanish–American War ===
On March 5, 1898, the Captain-General of Cuba, Ramón Blanco y Erenas, proposed for Gómez and his Cuban troops to join him and the Spanish Army in repelling the United States in the face of the Spanish–American War. Blanco appealed to the shared heritage of the Cubans and Spanish and promised the island's autonomy if the Cubans would help fight the Americans. Blanco had declared, "As Spaniards and Cubans we find ourselves opposed to foreigners of a different race, who are of a grasping nature.... The supreme moment has come in which we should forget past differences and, with Spaniards and Cubans united for the sake of their own defense, repel the invader. Spain will not forget the noble help of its Cuban sons, and once the foreign enemy is expelled from the island, she will, like an affectionate mother, embrace in her arms a new daughter amongst the nations of the New World, who speaks the same language, practices the same faith, and feels the same noble Spanish blood run through her veins." Gómez refused to adhere to Blanco's plan.

== Retirement ==
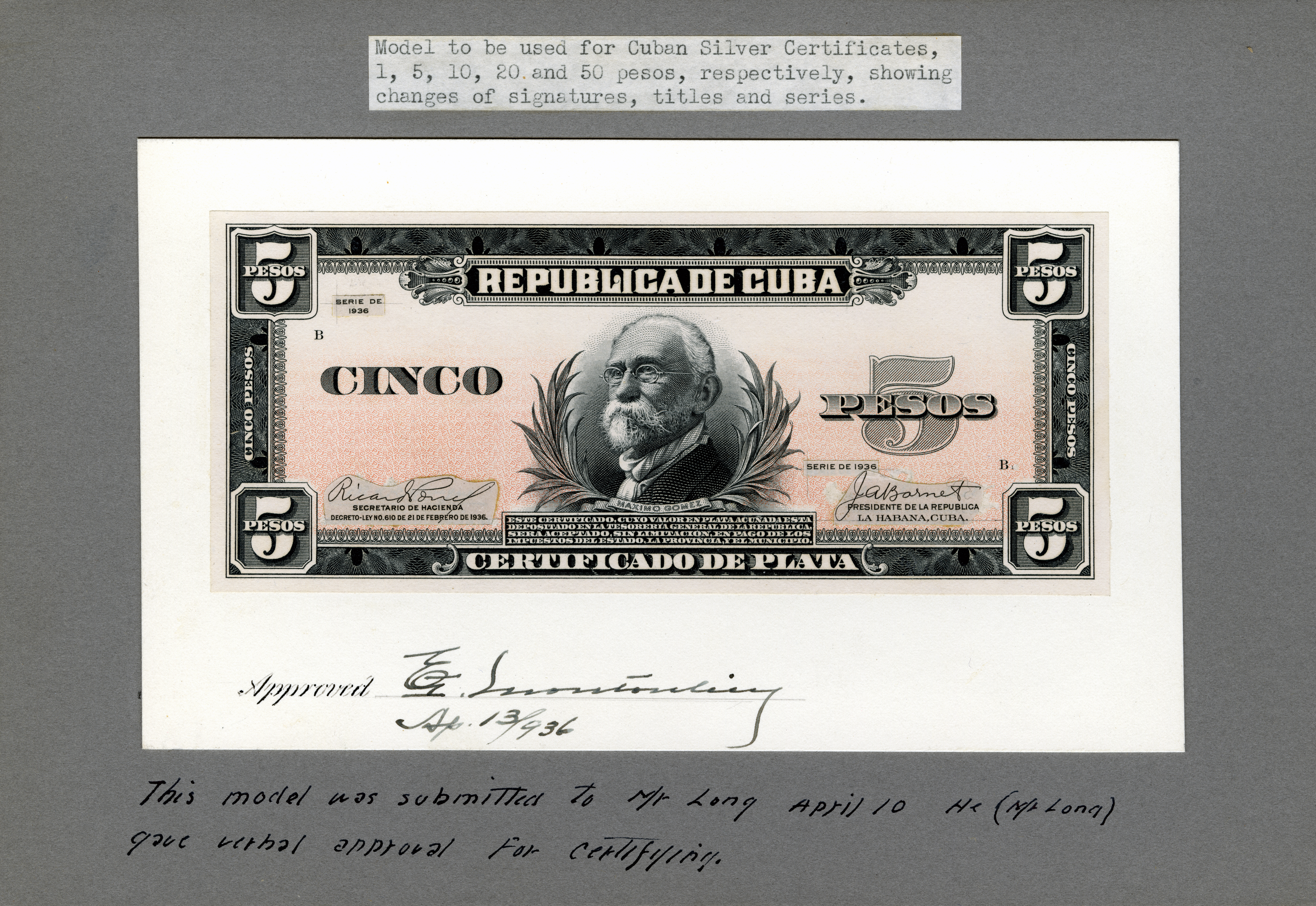
Gómez depicted on the artist/progress proof designed by the Bureau of Engraving and Printing for Cuban silver certificates (1936).

Gómez then retired to a villa outside of Havana. In 1899, he was dismissed as general-in-chief of the Cuban army by the Asamblea del Cerro, and this position was abolished. He refused the presidential nomination that was offered to him in 1901, which he was expected to win unopposed, mainly because he always disliked politics. Additionally, after 40 years of living in Cuba, he still felt that being Dominican-born, he should not become the civil leader of Cuba, admitting that he had helped Cuba gained its independence to make up for his mistake of fighting against his countrymen in the Dominican Restoration War.

He died in his villa in 1905 and was interred in the Colón Cemetery, Havana.

== Honors ==
- Máximo Gómez Command Academy, an educational institution of the Cuban Revolutionary Armed Forces.
- Máximo Gómez Park, a park in Miami, Florida, United States, now known as Domino Park, was named in his honor.
- The British alternative rock band Maxïmo Park, in turn, named itself after the park.
- Gómez's portrait is portrayed on Cuban currency on the 10 peso bill.
- A major avenue in the city of Santo Domingo, in the Dominican Republic, is named after him.
- A secondary school is named after him in his hometown of Baní, Dominican Republic.
- A provincial university was named in his honor: Universidad Máximo Gómez Báez de Ciego de Ávila, in Cuba .
- The current Dominican Senator for Peravia Province, Wilton Guerrero, has proposed changing the name of the province to "Máximo Gómez Province."
- A statue is in the front of the Instituto Preuniversitario in Camaguey, Cuba; he is seen on a horse with his scarf galloping while he is armed as if leading a machete charge.
- A station on Line 1 (Blue Line) of the Metro of Santo Domingo, capital city of the Dominican Republic is named after him.

== See also ==
- Luis Marcano
- Modesto Díaz
