= Buey Arriba =

- Municipality
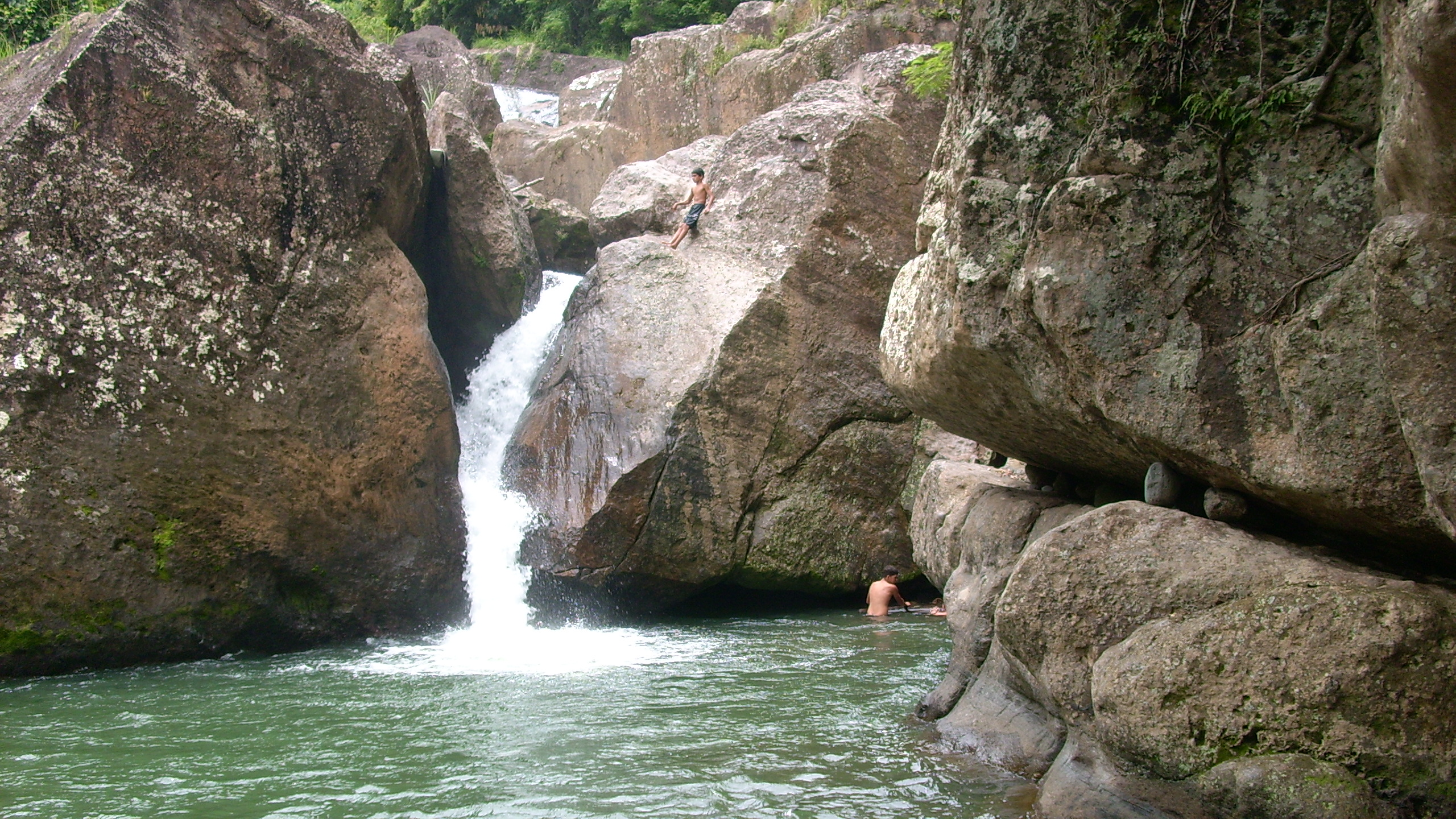
- Waterfall of the Río Brazo

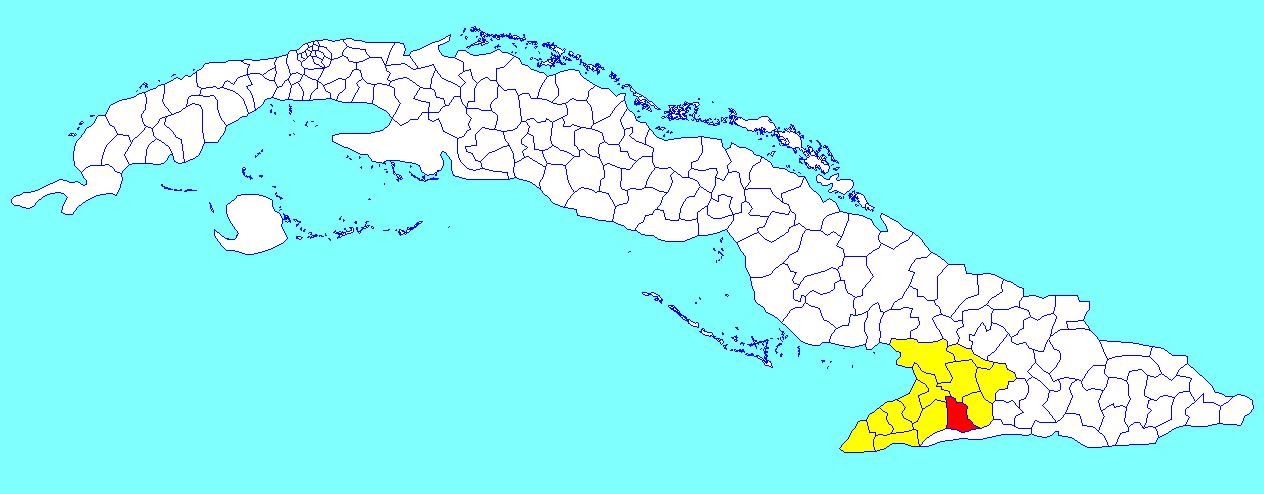
- Buey Arriba municipality (red) within Granma Province (yellow) and Cuba
- Coordinates: 20°10′25″N 76°44′58″W
- Country: Cuba
- Province: Granma

Area
  - Total: 452 km^{2} (175 sq mi)
- Elevation: 125 m (410 ft)

Population (2022)
  - Total: 30,573
  - Density: 67.6/km^{2} (175/sq mi)
- Time zone: UTC-5 (EST)
- Area code: +53-23
- Website: https://www.bueyarriba.gob.cu/

Buey Arriba is a mountainous municipality and town in the Granma Province of Cuba. It is located in the northern part of the Sierra Maestra, 30 kilometres (19 mi) south of Bayamo, the provincial capital.

== Etymology ==
When Spanish colonizers settled in this area, they encountered a peaceful mountain river with crystal-clear waters, but the sudden, heavy floods during the rainy season caused many disasters. The river's force was compared to that of an ox, giving it the name Buey (Spanish for ox). Today, it still bears the name Río Buey.

Two settlements were founded on the banks of the Río Buey. The first one, located in the Sierra Maestra mountains, was named Buey Arriba, and the second one, in the plains, was called Buey Abajo.

Today, the first one still carries the name Buey Arriba, or Minas de Buey Arriba, or Minas Sun, while the second one is now called Bueycito, one of the localities of the Buey Arriba municipality.

== Demographics ==
In 2022, the municipality of Buey Arriba had a population of 30,573, spread across various towns and rural communities in both plains and mountains. With a total area of 452 km^{2} (175 sq mi), it has a population density of 68/km^{2} (180/sq mi).

== Geography ==
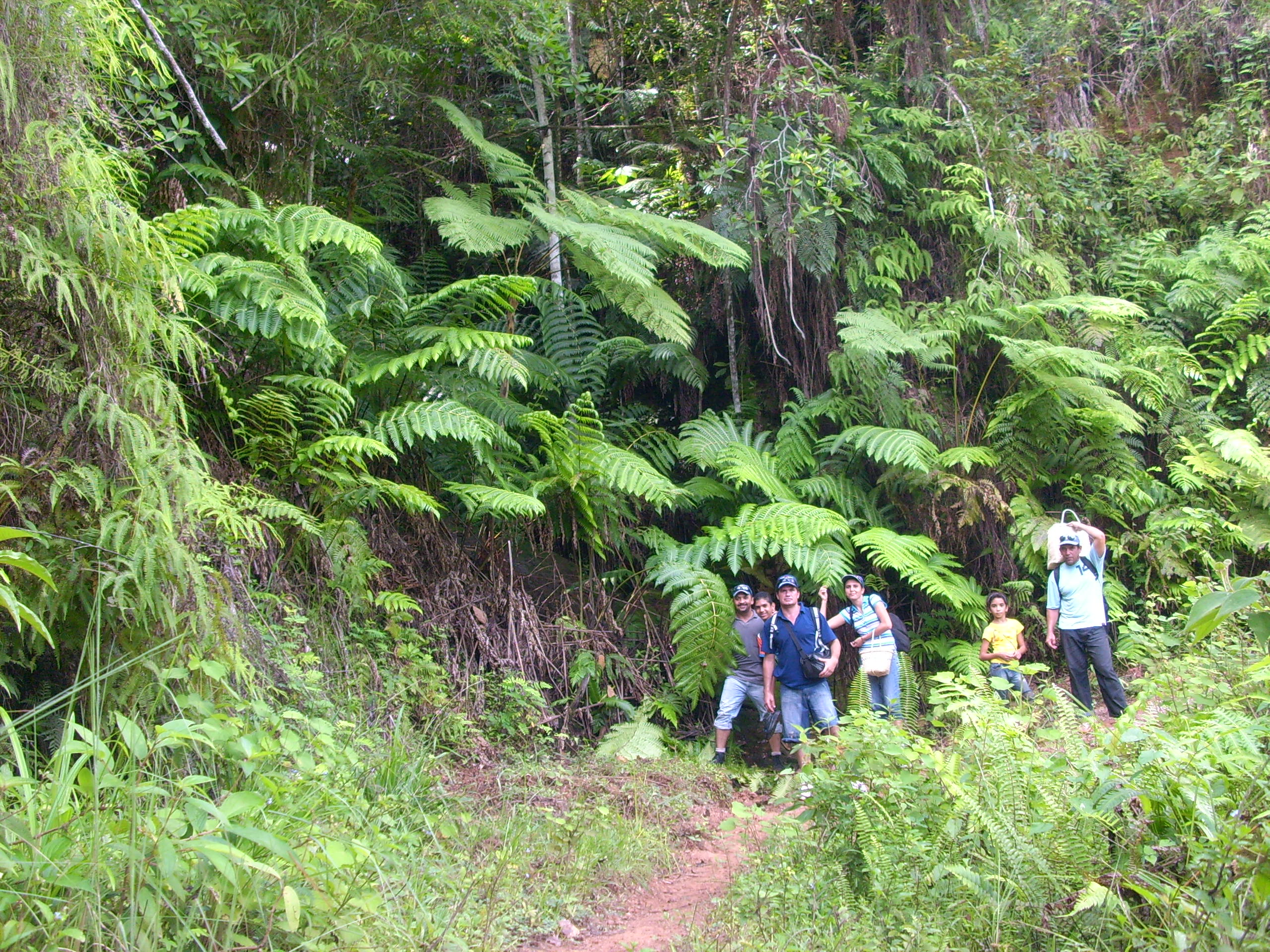
Tree ferns

It is located within the large Sierra Maestra National Park, home to unique vegetation and wildlife. This park preserves and protects Cuba's national symbols: the royal palm, the tocororo (Cuban trogon), and the mariposa (white ginger lily), Cuba's national flower.

Buey Arriba is located in the southern part of Granma province, on the northern slope of the Sierra Maestra. It borders Bayamo municipality to the north, Guisa municipality to the east, Guamá municipality in Santiago de Cuba Province to the south, Bartolomé Masó municipality to the west, and Yara municipality to the northeast. Its terrain is predominantly mountainous, with notable peaks such as Hombritos (1,722 m) and Batallas (1,557 m) above sea level.

In the northernmost part, a small, fertile plain stands out, where the settlements of Valenzuela and Bueycito are located.

The terrain is characterized by sedimentary and igneous rocks containing important mineral resources like zeolite, copper, and manganese. Manganese was mined in what is now the municipal capital (Minas de Buey Arriba), and copper was extracted from La Cristina, Vega Grande, Almendral, and other locations. There is also gold and silver, but in small quantities that do not justify exploitation.

The area has numerous streams and rivers, with the most important basins being:

- Río Hicotea River, which flows through Bartolomé Masó, Yara, and Manzanillo municipalities before emptying into the sea.
- Río Buey with two significant tributaries: Yao or Vega Grande, and Brazo de Buey, which join to form the Yao del Buey before flowing into the Río Buey near Tínima. The Río Buey continues through Yara and Manzanillo municipalities and empties into the sea in the Gulf of Guacanayabo in Manzanillo.

The municipality has a reservoir with a capacity of over 150 million cubic meters of water (originally 180 million cubic meters). It stores water from the Buey, Yao del Buey, and Hicotea rivers.

The climate is tropical mountainous, with lower temperatures in January and February, and higher ones in July and August. Rainfall is distributed throughout the year, with heavier rains from March to October and a drier period from November to April.

== Global Warming ==
This phenomenon is also affecting the local climate. Rains arrive much later, causing drought and increasing the risk of forest fires, excessive temperature rises, and rain patterns that are either scarce or overly abundant outside of their usual season. These changes have led to significant modifications in the local flora and fauna.

== History ==
Buey Arriba's history dates back to 1514, with the presence of the indigenous people. These lands were granted in encomienda to Manuel Rojas, nephew of Diego Velásquez; among these areas were Valenzuela (Areo) and Palmarito (Manicarao). The first inhabitants practiced a production-based economy. In Valenzuela, in 1848, a black slave discovered the so-called Bayamo Idol, a piece of exceptional value. Other notable settlements included Limones, Severiana, Maguaro, El Cedrón, Montero, and Corojito, where an appropriation-based economy was practiced. Valenzuela was the first population center of what is now Buey Arriba municipality during the 18th century. Initially a cattle ranch within the jurisdiction of Bayamo, it became the population center of the area and flourished with the construction of a Catholic church in honor of Our Lady of the Conception, called “Nuestra Señora de la Concepción de Valenzuela.”

A census conducted in 1761 recorded 52 families with a population of 366 people (328 souls and 38 servants).

Notably, by the last decade of the first half of the 19th century, population migration shifted toward the upper and lower parts of the Río Buey. Valenzuela, as a captaincy, was losing importance due to its remote location and the constant threat of the Río Yao overflowing in the spring. These factors diminished its relevance, while Bueycito, a corral within the Valenzuela estate, had gained importance since the 18th century, particularly with Spanish settlers and Cubans seeking fortune. By 1878, Bueycito had attained the status of a district.

In 1893, the first reports of copper and manganese mines in La Cristina and Platanito were recorded, later followed by mines in Altos de Trigueño Véliz.

In 1885, a Civil Registry law was enacted, and on July 4, 1889, Bueycito became a civil parish. Over time, notable revolutionary figures became influential in the area, including the wealthy landowner and patriot Francisco Vicente Aguilera, who owned a coffee plantation in San Juan de Buena Vista, the ruins of which still stand.

Other prominent historical figures from the Cuban War of Independence, such as Carlos Manuel de Céspedes, Antonio Maceo, Bartolomé Masó, and Calixto García, left their mark on the area. The region was home to insurgent camps, and several key events in Cuba’s wars of independence took place here, including battles, skirmishes, and military movements.

During the neocolonial period, Bueycito became a significant district with 1,590 inhabitants by 1899. The early 20th century brought foreign exploitation of mineral resources, particularly manganese, by U.S. companies like the SUM Belomé Company, which began operations in 1917. The mining industry attracted a workforce from surrounding regions, contributing to the development of new population centers.

By the 1940s, the area saw the foundation of workers' unions, the spread of communist ideals, and the rise of revolutionary fervor, laying the groundwork for the eventual Cuban Revolution. In 1957, Fidel Castro and Ernesto "Che" Guevara led revolutionary activities in the area, marking Buey Arriba as an important site in the struggle against Batista's regime.

Che Guevara’s first victory as a commander came in Bueycito, and the area hosted several key operations by the Cuban Revolutionary Army. By November 1958, the area was liberated from Batista's forces, a significant moment in the final phase of the Cuban Revolution.

=== Historical Events ===
- Fire of Bueycito: On the night of November 25-26, 1873, the Bueycito town barracks were attacked, with Brigadier Antonio Maceo and General Calixto García participating, along with figures like Quintín Banderas, Guillermón Moncada, Florencio Salcedo, Mariano Lora Torres, Flor Crombet, and others. In the action, the Colombian internationalist and Chief of Staff of Calixto García, Felipe Herrero, lost his left kneecap. After taking the barracks, they set it on fire, and only 20 houses survived the blaze. The Spanish suffered 15 casualties, including 5 dead and 10 wounded.
- El Macío: On January 2, 1880, Mariano Torres and his troops fought a strong column composed of Spanish forces and guerrillas in the mountains of El Macío.
- Babatuaba: On June 21, 1880, Calixto García Iñiguez camped near the Babatuaba stream, along the Mabay River, and remained in the area despite Spanish pursuit until his surrender on August 3, 1880.
- Mogote Uprising: On February 24, 1895, this uprising was led by Lieutenant Colonel Joaquín Estrada Castillo with a force of 98 men.
- Attack on Bueycito: On February 26, 1895, Esteban Tamayo Tamayo led a group of Cuban fighters (mambises) into Bueycito.
- Battle of Solís: On March 18, 1895, the mambises, led by Brigadier Jesús Rabí, ambushed Spanish General Gorrich in Solís, paralyzing the Spanish column, which was unable to reach Mogote. The mambises reported several wounded and five dead: Manuel Pacheco Blanco, soldiers Manuel Ugarte, José Rodríguez, Reymundo "Mundo" Pérez, and others who were not identified.
- Battle of Valenzuela: On April 17, 1895, Commander Amador Liens Cabrera led this battle against a Spanish column commanded by Colonel Michelena. During this battle, the mambises lost Lieutenant Cirilo Domínguez, who died on the battlefield.
- Battle of Peralejo: This battle was led by Major General Antonio Maceo against Captain General Arsenio Martínez Campos and Brigadier Fidel Alonso de Santocildes, who died in the action on July 13, 1895. Despite a shortage of bullets, the mambises emerged victorious, surprising the Spanish with their attack.
- Battle of Tuabeque: On December 16, 1896, forces under General Calixto García attacked the Spanish General Bosch's column, marching towards Bayamo, forcing them to abandon the main road and head toward Bueycito. After crossing the Buey River and engaging in several skirmishes, they were unable to continue. The battle spread to various locations by the morning of December 17 and ended with Bosch retreating on December 18, suffering around 400 casualties.
- Battle of Bueycito: On the morning of August 1, 1957, Commander Ernesto Che Guevara led the successful attack on the rural guard barracks. The barracks were taken, and the rebels set it on fire, suffering one casualty before retreating to the Sierra Maestra.
- Battle of El Hombrito: On August 30, 1957, Commander Che Guevara successfully led an attack on Merob Sosa García’s column, stopping it, though the rebels suffered one casualty.
- Battle of Altos de Conrado: On December 8, 1957, Che Guevara led the attack on a column commanded by Ángel Sánchez Mosquera. Although the rebels managed to halt the column, Che and other fighters were wounded. This was the only battle in Buey Arriba where Che and Camilo fought together.
- Battle of Alto de El Cojo: On November 28, 1957, Captain Camilo Cienfuegos Gorriarán led a successful attack on a column commanded by Ángel Sánchez Mosquera.
- Radio Rebelde: On February 24, 1958, Commander Ernesto Che Guevara established this radio station in the Altos de Conrado, in the Sierra Maestra.
- Battle of Montero: On March 19, 1958, Lieutenant René Serrano González ("Niní") led this battle against part of Ángel Sánchez Mosquera’s column. A rebel fighter and a collaborator were killed, along with several mules, and the neighborhood was burned.
- Battle of El Chopal: On April 2, 1958, Lieutenant Luis Antonio led this battle, defeating part of Ángel Sánchez Mosquera’s forces. In retaliation, the army burned the town of Maguaro on April 6.
- Battle of Severiana – Santa Rosa: On April 17, 1958, Commander Che Guevara’s forces successfully captured cattle from the Severiana farm but lost one man and Che was almost captured at Alto de Santa Rosa.
- Battle of Altos de Domínguez: On May 28, 1958, Lieutenant Juan Vitalio Acuña Núñez (Vilo) successfully led an attack on part of Ángel Sánchez Mosquera’s forces, causing the guards to flee.
- Battle of El Macío: On May 29, 1958, Captain Guillermo García Frías led a successful attack against Ángel Sánchez Mosquera’s column, forcing them to retreat with multiple casualties.
- Battle of Ramírez: On June 2, 1958, Lieutenant Misael Machado Roblejo led this battle against part of Ángel Sánchez Mosquera’s forces, dying in the action.

=== Historic Sites ===
- La Otilia: This strategic location became Che Guevara’s command post in support of the April 1958 strike. In his book Pasajes de la guerra revolucionaria (Passages of the Revolutionary War), Che recounts that they monitored Sánchez Mosquera’s movements from La Otilia. The site also served as a medical and photographic station. Che designed a supply network from La Otilia to La Mesa, Bueycito, Palmarito, San Pablo de Yao, and Veguitas. On April 1, 1958, Camilo Cienfuegos left from here for the lowlands.
- Altos de Conrado: The site where Commander Ernesto Che Guevara founded Radio Rebelde on February 24, 1958, in the Sierra Maestra.
- La Angostura: This site was home to mambi Juan Núñez Martínez from the late 19th to early 20th centuries. He fought in the wars for independence from 1868 to 1898 and was part of Maceo's Invasion Column.
- Bueycito Barracks: This was the site of several battles against Spanish forces. Today, it houses the Bueycito Museum.
- Corojito Cemetery: A massacre site used by Batista's regime in 1958, where prisoners were executed and buried in shallow graves.
- Mangos del Guajén: On July 12, 1895, Antonio Maceo Grajales and Bartolomé Masó, President of the Republic in Arms, met here.
- Lidia Doce Sánchez Cave: A cave used by revolutionary courier Lidia Esther Doce Sánchez for a transit camp starting in September 1957.
- Anacahuita: Che Guevara spoke with local residents after the attack on the Bueycito barracks on August 1, 1957.
- Pico de El Hombrito: On December 24, 1957, the flag of the July 26 Movement was raised here by Che Guevara, marking liberated territory in the Sierra Maestra.
- Mogotes: Site of the February 24, 1895, uprising led by Lieutenant Colonel Joaquín Estrada Castillo with 98 farmers.
- Virey Camp: This camp, led by Captain Orestes Bárzaga Enamorado, located in the Virey neighborhood, was the last front to which Column #4 extended in the territory of Minas de Bueycito, directed by its commander Ernesto Che Guevara.

== Economy ==
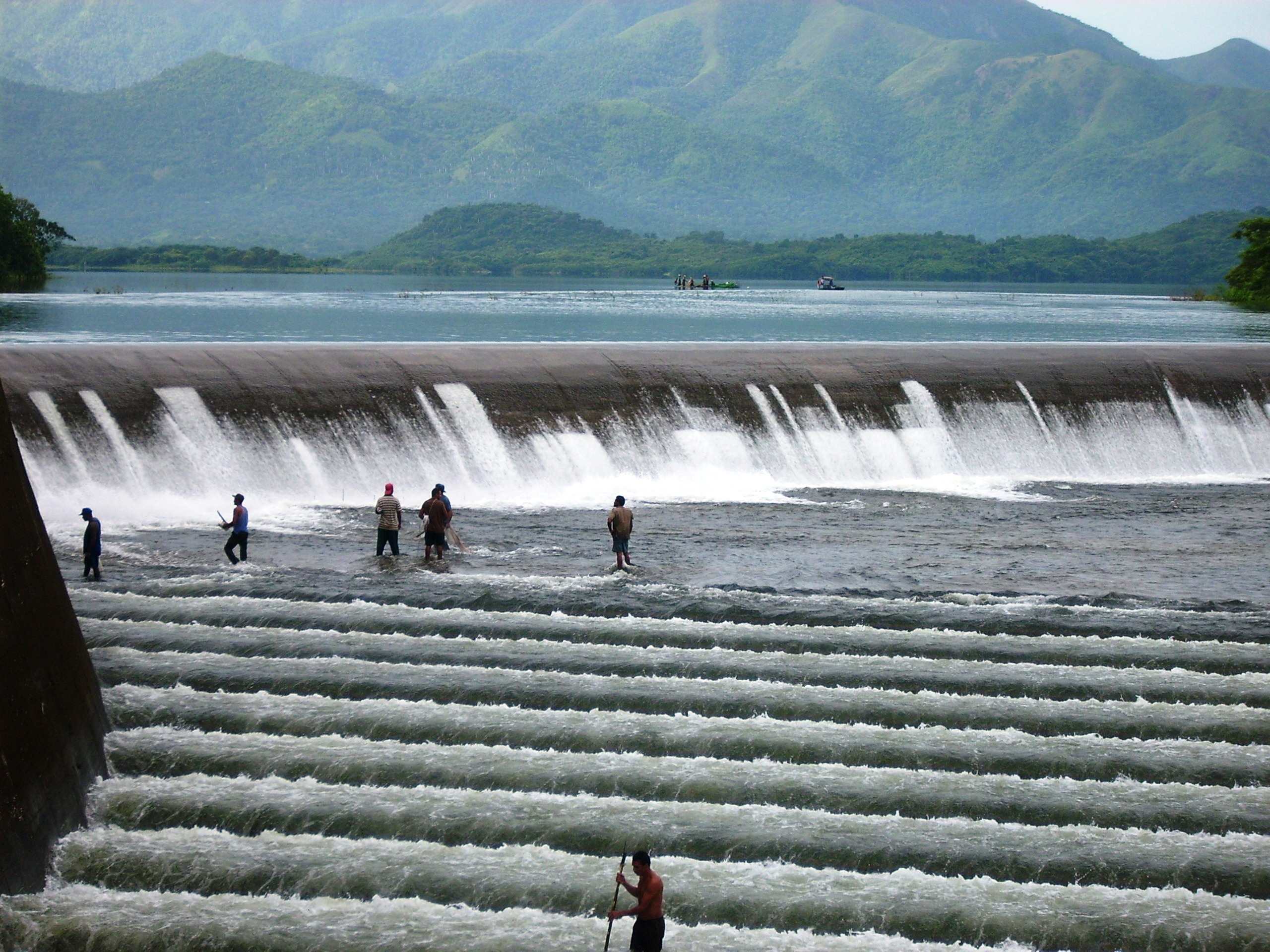
Spillway of the Buey Arriba reservoir

Buey Arriba is an agricultural municipality. The main crop is coffee. Annually, about 200,000 cans of coffee are harvested, making it one of the largest coffee-producing municipalities in the province of Granma, alongside the territories of Guisa and Bartolomé Masó.

Buey Arriba produces coffee for both national consumption and export in significant ranges of quality and productivity. Its growers and harvesters have vast experience in cultivating coffee in a rugged mountainous area and other lands not far from the urban area. The coffee company has planted 319 caballerías (61,950 acres) of coffee trees, many of which are part of state production units, cooperatives, and independent farmers' estates. They rigorously apply necessary aerotechnical measures and keep the fields free of weeds.

Cacao and other agricultural products for local consumption are also cultivated, along with fruits like mango, which are used for producing preserves.

Craftsmanship holds an important place, not so much in the economic order but in the cultural sphere, especially in the production of furniture and decorations made from dry natural materials, such as vines, palm bark, and more.

Another economic activity is fishing in the reservoir located in this area, as well as livestock farming on a smaller scale.

Mining used to be an economic resource, with manganese and copper now serving as reserves for the country in this municipality.

== Culture ==
There is a network of cultural institutions comprising: a municipal museum with three extensions (Bueycito, La Otilia, and La Mesa), a cultural center, the "Ataque a Bueycito" cinema, television and video rooms within the plan, a bookstore, a public library, a branch library, three 16mm film projection teams, a professional organ "M-80," and the Municipal Directorate of Culture.

The cultural and technical strength of the municipality includes graduates with higher education degrees, such as Bachelors in Primary Education, History and Social Sciences, Spanish and Literature, and Marxism-Leninism History. The municipality also has music, theater, and dance instructors, as well as experts in museology and library science. There is an archaeology group formed by specialists and enthusiasts.

Buey Arriba, like other towns, has been developing by adopting fundamental aspects of its ancestors' lives, whose customs they have integrated into their culture, forming one of the strongest legacies today.

Among the cultural expressions, the Areíto played a role in ritual acts, which later manifested in the "Danza Daumet" influenced by Haitian culture. This dance originated in the Limones area, where there was a significant Haitian settlement, but later spread to Camagüey.

In 1960, the first manifestations of theater appeared, supported by the Catholic Church. In 1968, theater roots became more popular with the arrival of the first playwright to the municipality.

Notable figures contributing to cultural development include Agustín García, one of the main representatives of music and founder of the amateur movement. Other prominent figures include Eliécer García, Iraldo Frías, Luis Bello, and Luis Leiva.

The amateur movement was founded between the 1960s and 1970s, led by the aforementioned personalities in all artistic expressions. Music festivals were held with amateur groups, such as "Estrellas Juveniles," the trio "Tres Guitarras," and "Bello y sus Muchachos."

One of the most outstanding traditions were the Martianas days, held on January 27 and 28 in honor of the National Hero José Martí. This cultural activity was promoted in 1935 by the Popular Socialist Party. Serenades with organ dances were held, which remain a tradition among the older population, especially in the mountain areas. Other traditions included peasant music (guateques campesinos), peasant festivals, and ballroom dances.

Cultural habits that still resonate today include dance, music, and literature. In literature, the municipality stands out for its many writers specializing in poetry and the traditional décima, which has been passed down through generations.

Some towns in the municipality had rich cultural traditions, such as San Pablo de Yao, where the San Pablo festivals were held. In Bueycito, between 1915 and 1920, the Candelaria festivals were traditionally held on February 2 and 3.

Popular craftsmanship has long been part of daily life in Buey Arriba, serving as a means of work and entertainment. Leatherwork, the making of items from palm fibers (yarey), doll-making, weaving, and embroidery have been passed down through generations.

== Health ==
The health system in this municipality consists of a teaching polyclinic, a rural hospital, a maternity home, and 55 medical clinics located within the Plan Turquino. With the development of the National Health System, services have expanded to cover many specialties. One highlight is ophthalmology, which began in the 1980s with refractive exams, later complemented by ophthalmological consultations initiated by Dr. Iraldo Arevalo in the new polyclinic inaugurated in 1991. This was the start of elective surgeries in this mountainous region. In December 2001, a project in cooperation with the National Program for the Prevention of Blindness, sponsored by CIC, MINSAP, and CBM of Germany, was launched to operate on cataract patients. The project culminated in January 2002 with 44 cataract surgeries at the Antonio Prieto Hospital in the municipality, making it the first mountainous municipality in the country to perform such surgeries. Recently, one phase of the "Misión Milagro" project was carried out in the Granma region, with more than 1,200 surgeries performed, 149 of which were cataract surgeries.

== Education ==
The municipality has primary schools, secondary schools, a teaching center, a medical sciences center, a sports school, and a branch of the University of Granma (UDG). There are also two Youth Computing and Electronics Clubs offering services to the community.

== Varieties ==
The municipality has a local TV channel called MinasVisión, as well as the award-winning documentary producer TV Serrana. There is also a Linux user group called "LinuXierra," the first such group created in the mountains of Cuba.

== Sources ==
- Historical documents from the Municipal Museum.
- Archives of the National Institute of Sports.
- Archives of the Municipal Directorate of Education.
- Archives of the Municipal Directorate of Health.
- Archives of the Communist Party of Cuba.
- National Office of Statistics.

== See also ==
- Municipalities of Cuba
- List of cities in Cuba
