= Battle of Peralejo =

- Part of Cuban War of Independence
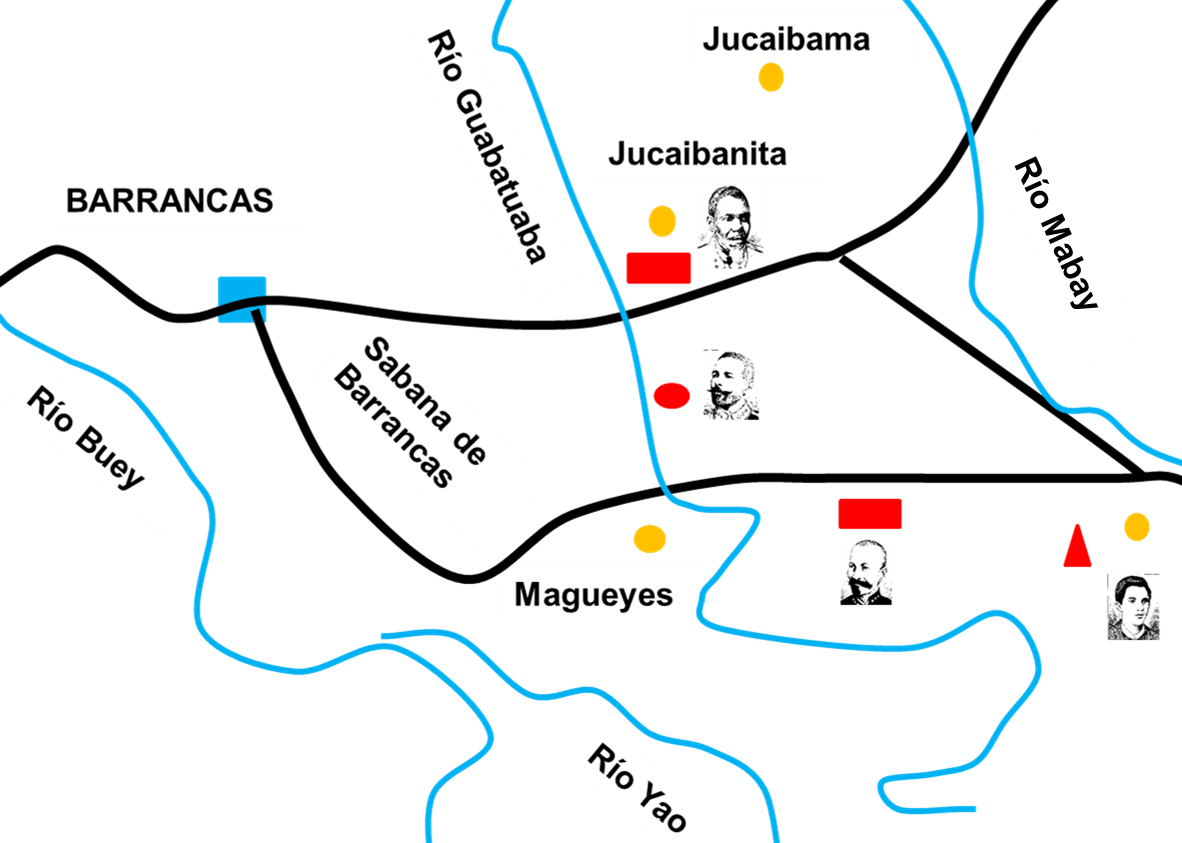
- Phase 1 of the Main Battle
Date	July 13, 1895
Location	Peralejo, Oriente Province, Cuba
Result	Cuban victory

Belligerents
Cuban Rebels	Spain

Commanders and leaders
Antonio Maceo; Alfonso Goulet †; Bartolomé Masó; Jesús Rabí	Arsenio Martínez Campos; Fidel Santocildes †

Units involved
1st Corps; 2nd Corps	1st and 2nd battalions of the Isabel La Católica Regiment

Strength
More than 1,050 men: Unknown General Staff; 600 Infantry men from the 1st and 2nd Corps; 200 Cavalry from the 2nd Corps; 250 men from the 2nd Corps reinforcement	Total approx: 1,540 men: Approx. 1,460 Infantry men; Approx. 80 guerrilla men

Casualties and losses
118 dead and wounded	20 dead and 98 wounded

The Battle of Peralejo was a military confrontation between Cuban independence rebels, under the command of Major General Antonio Maceo against the forces of the Spanish Army, under the command of Captain General Arsenio Martínez Campos, which was part of Maceo's First Eastern Campaign during the Cuban War of Independence.

== Background ==
=== Cuban Operations ===
During the Eastern Campaign, Major General Antonio Maceo Grajales, headed for Bayamo with forces from Cambute and Santiago de Cuba. Its purpose was to confront the Spanish columns that operated there, and that supply the Spanish detachments of the central line, especially Bayamo, the head of the district.

On July 5, 1895, Brigadier Jesús Rabí joined forces from Jiguaní in Cacao, and on July 7 they camped on the Buey River, in the area of Valenzuela, southwest of Bayamo.

=== Spanish Operations ===
General Arsenio Martínez Campos and Brigadier Fidel A. Santocildes coordinated the organization of the Spanish convoys, coming from Manzanillo and Cauto Embarcadero to Bayamo.

On July 11, Santocildes, with a short column of 400 men made up of two companies from the 1st and 2nd battalions of the Isabel La Católica regiment, and 40 guerrillas from Captain Travesí, left Manzanillo for Veguitas.

On July 12, Martínez Campos, with a small column of about 450 men made up of the Spanish forces of Lieutenant Colonel Baquero and the guerrillas of Lieutenant Colonel Lolo Benítez, left Manzanillo for Veguitas, joining Santocildes. Then they are joined by 250 soldiers from the 6th peninsular battalion under the command of Lieutenant Colonel San Martín and 400 soldiers from the 2nd battalion of the Isabel La Católica regiment under the command of Lieutenant Colonel Federico Escario. The Spanish forces stationed in Veguitas would be a total 1,500 troops. The presence of the Spanish forces is informed to Major General Maceo by Rafael Silveira.

== Preparation for the Ambush ==
On July 12, Maceo with his forces in Vega de Yao began to develop their tactical plan, the attack would be on the convoy from Manzanillo. On the same day, Major General Bartolomé Masó, head of the 2nd Liberation Army Corps, with his staff and the forces of Colonels Esteban Tamayo, Joaquín Estrada and Juan Masó Parra arrived at the Maceo camp, pasture in Valenzuela, where he interview.

Upon retiring, Masó left Maceo some squadrons of cavalry with colonels Esteban Tamayo, Joaquín Estrada and Juan Masó Parra. At midnight, by order of Maceo, the forces of the liberating army move towards Solís. On July 13 at dawn, Maceo sets up the Vega de Yao camp, and is located in El Santísimo, (a place that dominates the two routes from Barrancas to Bayamo), with the cavalry. The infantry troops of Brigadier Jesús Rabí and Colonel Quintin Banderas, are located on the road to Solís, lower route. The rearguard is located in La Caoba (Brigadier Alfonso Goulet) and in Yao del Gallego (Major General Bartolomé Masó). The arrival of more Cuban reinforcements from Manzanillo would be expected.

== The Battle ==
=== The Spanish Evasion of the Ambush ===
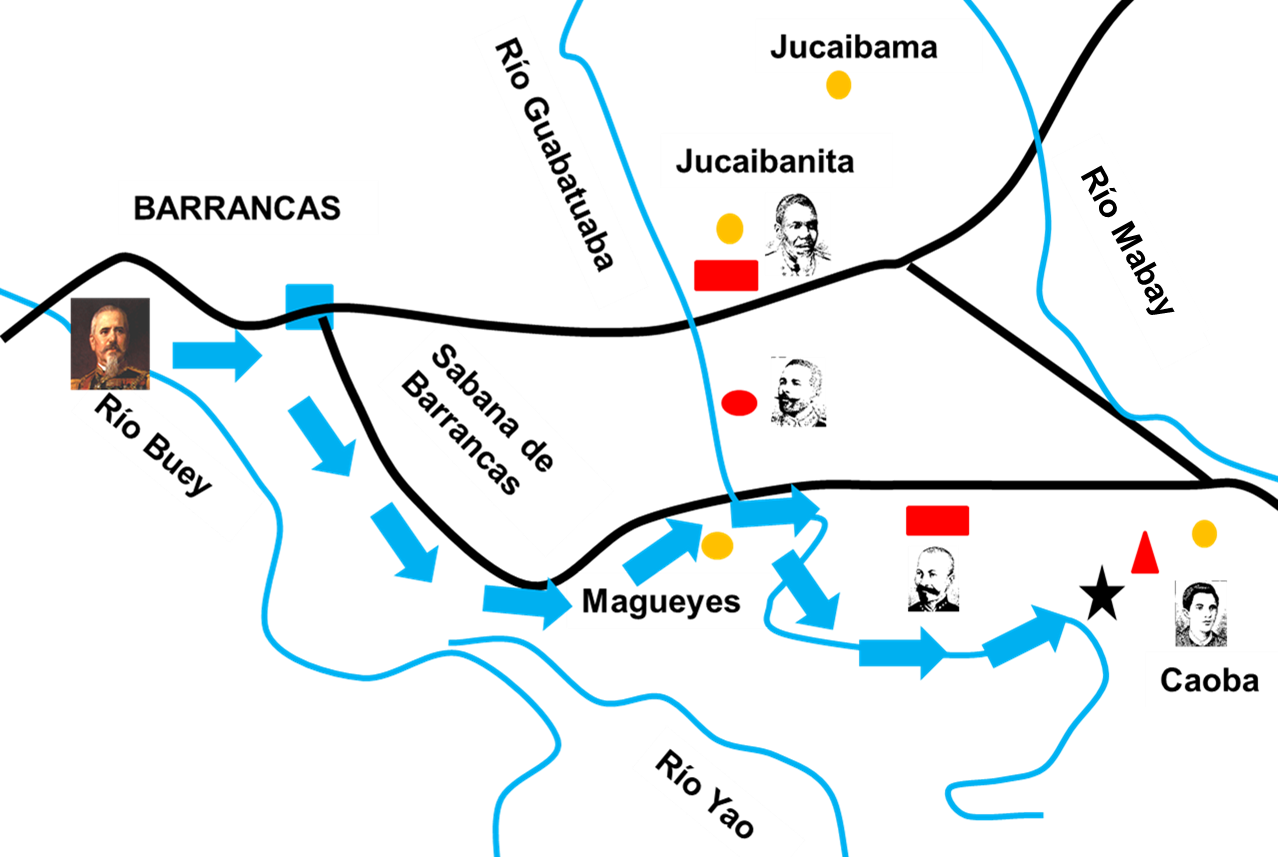
Second Phase of the Attack

Martínez Campos had 400 infantry and 40 horsemen and heads for Barrancas, while Santocildes with 1,100 infantry and guerrillas travel to either Bueycito or Valenzuela, both meet and cross the Buey river pass and then divide, joining both in Barrancas. Campos informed by confidants of the presence of the Mambises in El Tanteo and other positions, evadeded the surprise attack.

=== Attack of the Spanish to the Cuban rearguard ===
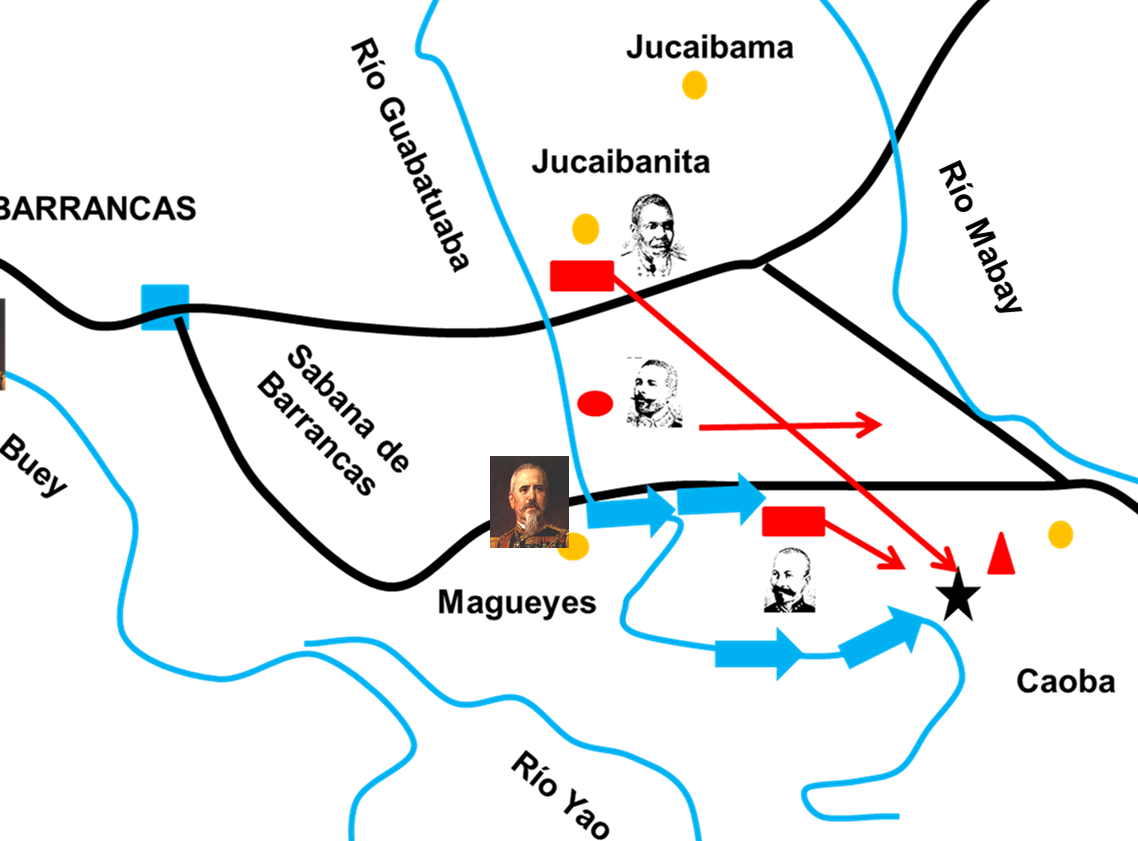
Third Phase of the Attack

Both Spanish generals with a column of 1,540 men, depart from Barrancas along the Solís road which was thelower route, and separating at Magueyes, Campos reinforced with Captain Travesí's Guerrilla by the Peralejo road and Santocildes penetrating the mountain in a parallel direction from Martínez Campos, outwitting the ambushes of Rabí's infantry and attacking Alfonso Goulet's impedimenta.

The guerrilla forces had been waiting for almost six hours, and around ten in the morning the battle began in La Caoba, between the forces of Santocildes and Goulet, who died in the confrontation.

=== Counterattack of Maceo's forces ===
Maceo steps forward with his staff to examine the order and position of the enemy. Maceo ordered the infantry to flank to the right and interpose themselves between the Spanish and La Caoba, while he and the cavalry stopped them, and Commander Moncada fell.

The Campos column joins the fight, while Maceo orders a squad to attack it while it was harassed by the guerrilla infantry, to avoid the union of the two Spanish columns. The Santocildes column moves away from La Caoba to meet the Campos column, and together they head to the Peralejos savanna. The Cuban infantry positioned themselves on the enemy's right flank, in the nearby mountains of the road, while the Cuban cavalry did so on the left in the Peralejo savanna (escort from the Maceo headquarters, Luz de Yara regiment squadron, squadron of the Cespedes regiment) and on the right of the road above Bacajama, near Mabay (squadron of the Cespedes regiment).

=== Arrival of Cuban Reinforcements ===
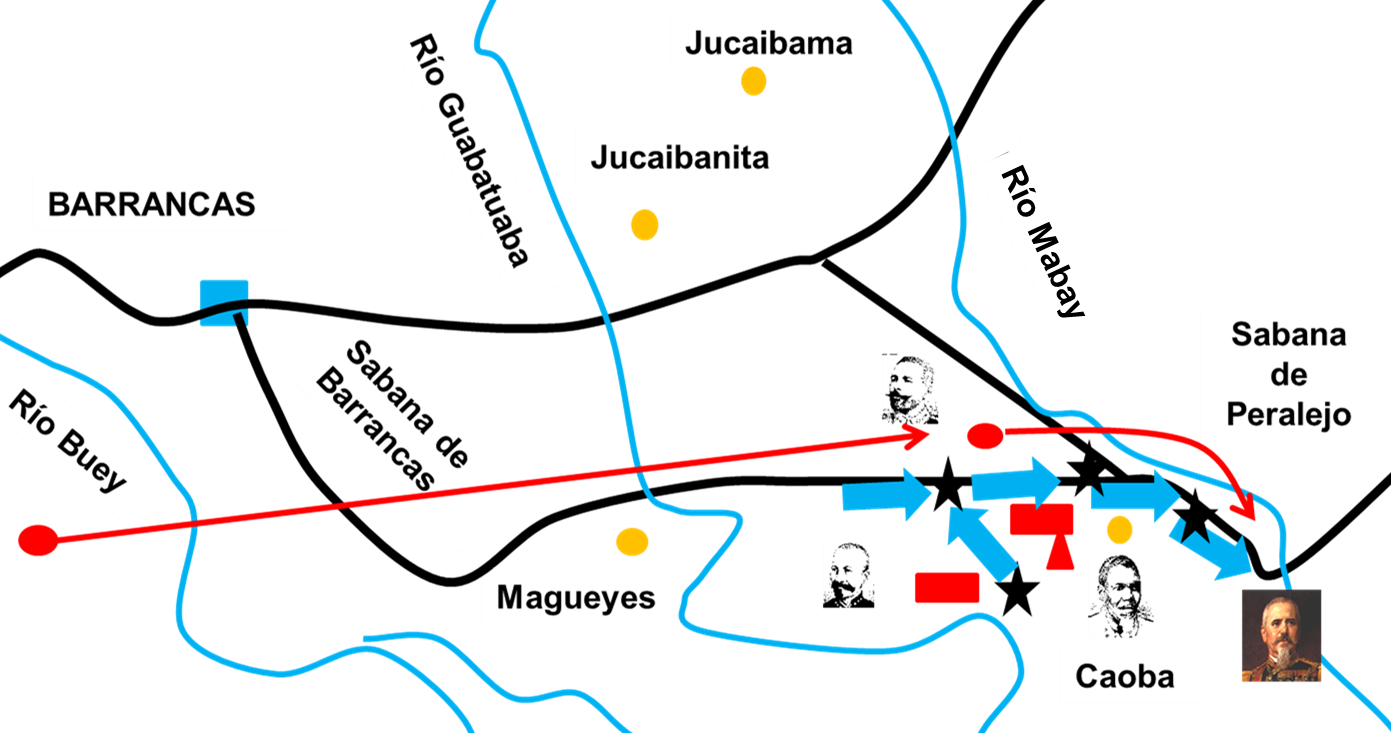
Fourth Phase of the Attack

The reinforcements from Manzanillo, who cross the Babatuaba River, arrive at Maceo: 3 squadrons of the Guá regiment under the command of Colonel Salvador Hernández Ríos and Lieutenant Colonel Alonso Rivero, from Campechuela, adding 250 men, following Maceo's orders for concentration of forces. The reinforcement is attacked by the guerrillas accidentally.

=== Withdrawal of the Spanish forces ===
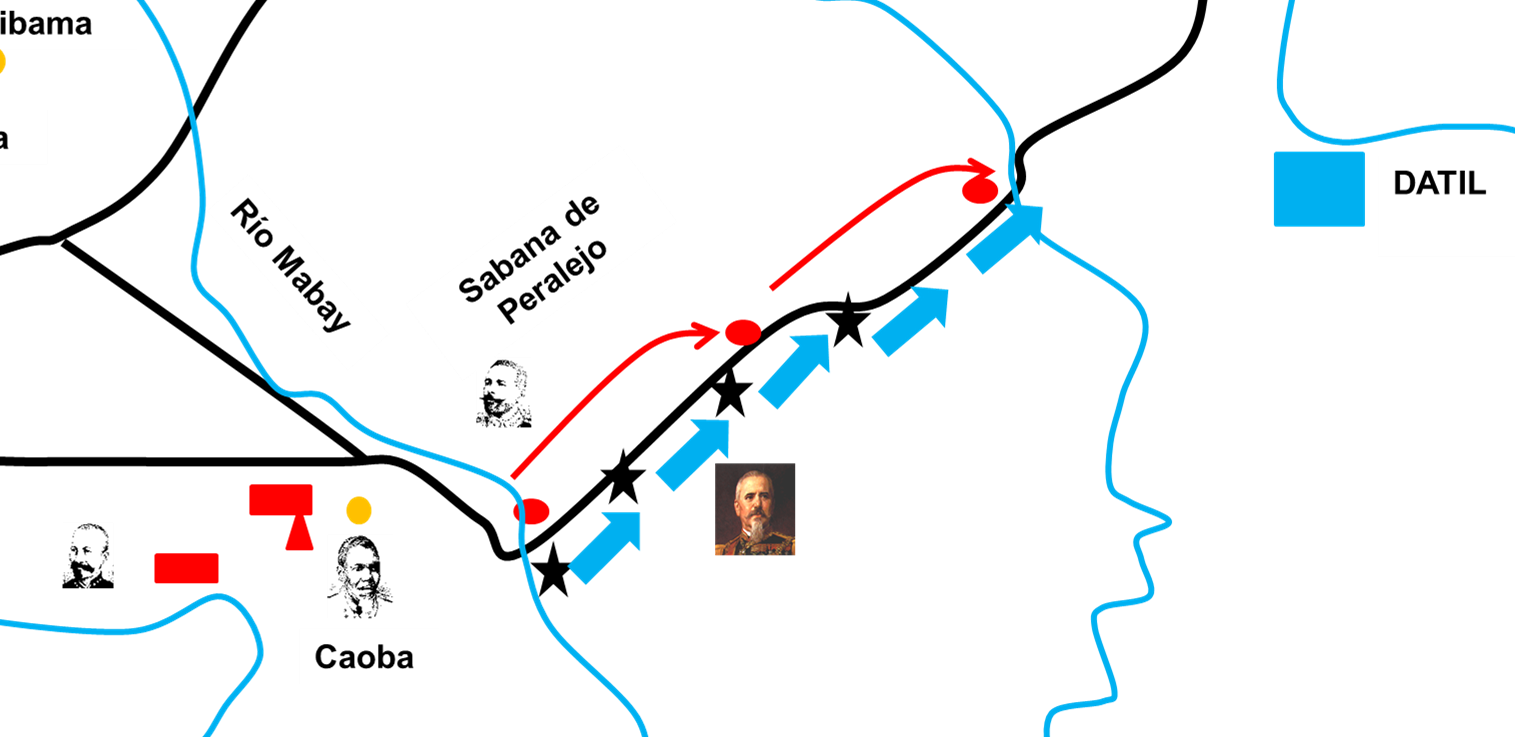
Fifth Phase of the Attack

Maceo sends two squadrons of Lieutenant Colonel Rivero to join the cavalry, and Colonel Ríos's squad to join Headquarters. Under the Cuban attack, the Spanish forces managed to reach the Mabay River, while the Cubans occupied the Mabay River pass, among them Maceo with his staff and the Guá regiment squad.

The Spanish flee, while the Cuban infantry runs out of ammunition, Maceo orders the squad of the Cespedes regiment near Mabay to join the cavalry and attack the enemy. The Spaniards were harshly harassed until El Dátile, and were weakly persecuted until Bayamo. Campos with the column managed to escape towards Bayamo.

In the skirmish by the Spanish army there are 28 casualties, including Brigadier Santocildes, and some 98 wounded; while in the rebel army there are 118 casualties among the dead (Brigadier Alfonso Goulet, Colonel Carlos Suárez and Lieutenant Colonel Manuel la O Jay, Commander Moncada, fell) and wounded.

Maceo establishes his headquarters in Santa Gertrudis (near Bayamo), besieging Bayamo. Later, Maceo continues the First Eastern Campaign towards Santiago de Cuba.

== Bibliography ==
- Colectivo de Autores: Diccionario Enciclopédico de Historia Militar de Cuba. Tomos I y II. La Habana. 2004.
- Maso Parra, Juan: Primera parte de un libro para la historia. Imprenta de A. Bethencourt. Cuba, año 1904.
- Piedra Martel, Manuel: Mis primeros 30 años. Editorial Letras Cubana. La Habana. Año 1979.
