= Battle of Loma del Gato =

1896 battle of the Cuban War of Independence

- Part of Cuban War of Independence
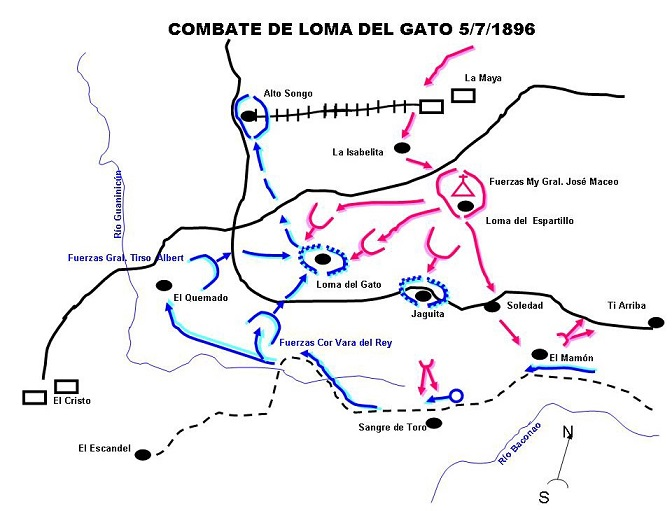
- Map of the battle
Date	July 5, 1896
Location	Santiago de Cuba, Oriente Province, Cuba
Result	Spanish victory

Belligerents
Cuban rebels	Spain

Commanders and leaders
José Maceo †; Pedro Agustín Pérez; Matías Vega Alemán; Agustín Cebreco; Luis Bonne	Tirso Albert; Joaquín Vara de Rey

Units involved
1st Corps	Two columns

Casualties and losses
16 killed and 40 or 50 wounded	80 dead and 160 wounded

The Battle of Loma del Gato took place during the Cuban War of Independence on July 5, 1896 at Santiago de Cuba, Oriente Province. It is notable for the death of Mambí General José Maceo.

== The Battle ==
After spending the night camped outside the village of La Isabelita, the Mambí forces crossed the railroad at La Maya in the direction of El Espartillo, as a part of their Oriente campaign. When the Mambises reached El Espartillo, they were fired upon from the Spanish-held outposts of Sangre de Toro and Camarones.

General Maceo reached El Espartillo and from there arranged the disposition of his forces: Colonel Luis Bonne was to march with his Prado Regiment in the direction of La Jagüita whilst Colonel Agustín Cebreco marched towards the Loma del Gato; Brigadier Pedro Agustín Pérez was to cover the position of El Mamón, and Brigadier Matías Vega Alemán was to provide support to Cebreco's forces.

About fifteen minutes later, Maceo sent Colonel Luis Aranda towards La Jagüita, so that Colonel Bonne would move in to attack the Spanish, and ordered Lieutenant Colonel Francisco Sánchez Hechavarría's flying column Maceo, to advance towards the Loma del Gato and support Cebreco's forces, which were already fighting.

After about twenty minutes, Maceo became impatient because he did not hear fighting in the direction in which Sánchez Hechavarría was supposed to be attacking and decided to march with his escort and adjutants to meet the Spanish, who were engaging Cebreco's forces.

=== Death of General Maceo ===
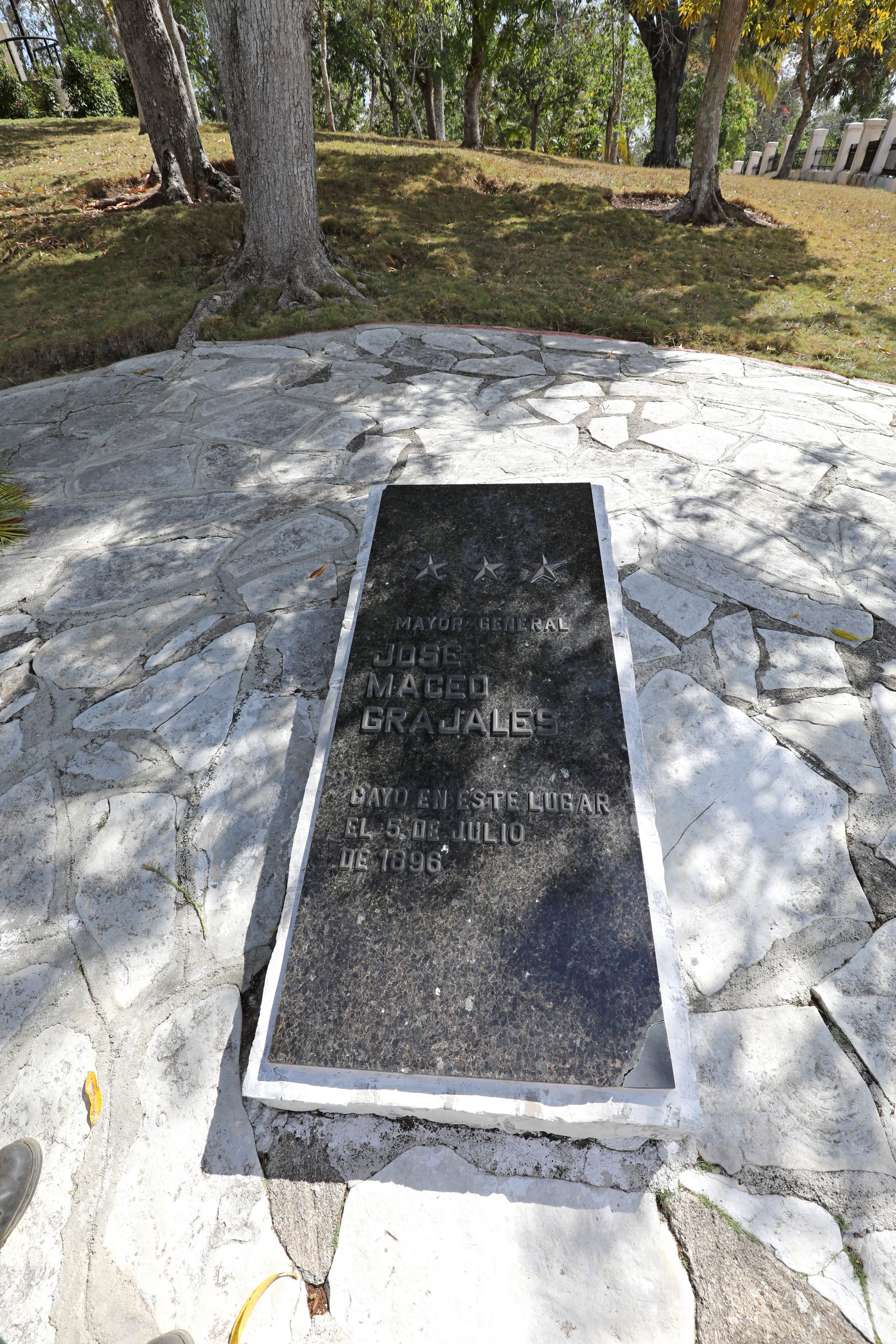

Upon reaching Loma del Gato, General Maceo quickly rallied the troops that accompanied him and charged into battle.

A few minutes later, whilst fighting on horseback, Maceo came too close to the Spanish positions, drawing fire from them. A bullet struck him in the head and he collapsed from his horse.

His aide, Lieutenant Salvador Durruty, tried to lift him off the ground, receiving a bullet in the groin. Mambí medic Porfirio Valiente extracted the projectile from General Maceo while the battle raged around them. Moments later, the general succumbed to his wounds.

The Cubans suffered another 15 casualties in the course of the battle and were routed; the battle was a blow for the Mambises, having lost an important general.
