= Agustín Cebreco =

Cuban activist and revolutionary (1855–1924)

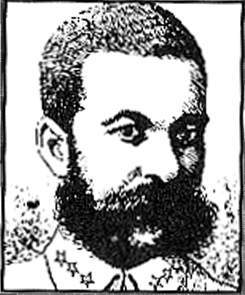

Delegate of the Cuban House of Representatives
- In office May 20, 1901 – Unknown
- President: Tomás Estrada Palma

Personal details
- Born: May 25, 1855 El Cobre, Oriente Province, Cuba
- Died: December 19, 1924 (aged 69) Havana, Cuba

Military service
- Allegiance: Cuba
- Branch: Cuban Revolutionary Army
- Years of service: 1868 – 1898
- Battles/wars: Ten Years' War; Little War; Cuban War of Independence: Battle of Sao del Indio

Agustín Cebreco Sánchez (El Cobre, Santiago de Cuba, Cuba, 25 May 1855 – Havana, Cuba, 19 December 1924), was a Cuban major general and politician of the Mambí Army.

== Biography ==
=== Origins and the Ten Years' War ===
Cebreco Agustín Sánchez was born in the town of El Cobre, Santiago de Cuba, Cuba, on May 25 of 1855.

On October 10, 1868, the Ten Years' War broke out which was the first war of independence of Cuba.

Cebreco rose up in arms, not yet 15 years old, and joined the troops of the then Lieutenant Colonel José Maceo. Later, he fought under the orders of Generals Antonio Maceo Grajales and Calixto García. He was promoted to Commander in late October 1876. His brothers, Juan Pablo and José Candelario, also joined the Cuban independence forces.

On February 10, 1878, some Cuban officials signed with Spain the Pact of the Zanjón, which ended the war without recognizing the independence of Cuba. Antonio Maceo and most of the eastern officials opposed such a pact, including the Cebreco brothers. The three brothers were promoted to Lieutenant Colonel, after the Baraguá Protest, in March 1878.

=== Little War and Fertile Truce ===
Agustín Cebreco was one of the chiefs of the Palma Soriano region, during the Little War (1879–1880), the second war for the independence of Cuba. Captured by the enemy on May 1, 1880, he was deported to Spain, along with other Cuban patriots captured. Later, he managed to escape and went into exile in the United States. Later, he participated in the Gómez-Maceo Plan.

=== Cuban War of Independence ===
On February 24, 1895, the Cuban War of Independence broke out which was the third war for the independence of Cuba. The already Colonel Cebreco was one of the 23 expedition members of the Schooner “Honor”, along with Generals Antonio Maceo, José Maceo and Flor Crombet, who landed in Duaba in April of that year to join the war. After disembarking, the expedition members dispersed as a result of enemy persecution.

Cebreco, after meeting and joining the mambises, was commissioned by Antonio Maceo to organize various brigades in the eastern part of the country. He was promoted to Brigadier General on May 3, 1895. He participated in numerous combative actions, including the Battle of Sao del Indio, on August 31, 1895. In November, it assisted the landing of the “Horsa” steamer, which brought General Francisco Carrillo Morales.

Later, Cebreco participated in the Battle of Loma del Gato, on July 5, 1896, where his boss, Major General José Maceo, died. On September 14 of that same year, he was promoted to Major General. He participated in the Siege of Santiago de Cuba and was promoted to Major General on August 18, 1898, the year the war ended.

=== Later Years and Death ===
General Cebreco participated in the 1901 Cuban general election. Later, he was a delegate to the Cuban House of Representatives, a position for which he was reelected twice.

Major General Agustín Cebreco Sánchez, died in Havana, on December 19, 1924, at the age of 69. The Plaza de El Cobre bears his name.
