= Battle of Sao del Indio =

Battle in the Cuban War of Independence

- Part of Cuban War of Independence
Date	August 31, 1895
Location	Sao del Indio, Oriente Province, Cuba
Result	Cuban rebel victory

Belligerents
Cuban Rebels	Spain

Commanders and leaders
Antonio Maceo; José Maceo; Pedro Agustín Pérez; Agustín Cebreco	Francisco Borja Canellas

Strength
650 mambises	900 soldiers, 200 guerrillas and a cannon

Casualties and losses
89 Casualties	200+ Casualties

The Battle of El Indio Sao was a battle of the Cuban War of Independence which took place on the 31st of August 1895 in Oriente Province of Cuba.

== The Battle ==
In this site of Guantánamo, 650 mambises under the command of Generals Antonio and José Maceo, fought against an enemy column of about 900 men, whose objective was to capture or kill José, because they knew that he was almost disabled and had only 50 escort men. Despite his illness, General José rode horseback. He had already warned his brother, who, without wasting a minute, undertook a terrible march, in a dark night, along terrible roads, until he reached three in the morning.

At dawn, the Spanish column started the march, but in the Palmar de Ampudia they had to fight against a Cuban ambush, placed by General José. Cuban Brigadier Agustín Cebreco flanked the enemy on the left and reached the Baconao River, where José, at the top of the Loma del Trucutú, was fighting. After nine hours of fighting, the Mambises took possession of the heights of Sao del Indio and forced the Hispanics to retreat with numerous casualties.

Antonio Maceo ordered Brigadier "Periquito" Pérez to let her pass free to make her fall into a trap with explosives, which destroyed the vanguard, but the Spanish leader ordered to continue advancing without dealing with the dead or wounded. At dawn on September 2, the colonial force began the march towards the nearby city and the Cubans were only able to harass the rear.

== Aftermath ==
The victory of this important battle had as a consequence the rapid consolidation of the Cuban forces in the war that was beginning, as well as the achievement of important military victories, the incorporation of a large number of combatants into the Mambi ranks and the obtaining of new weapons and ammunition.

This battle, victorious for the Cubans, concluded the successful First Eastern Campaign, commanded by Lieutenant General Antonio Maceo.
