= Battle of El Jobito =

- Part of Cuban War of Independence
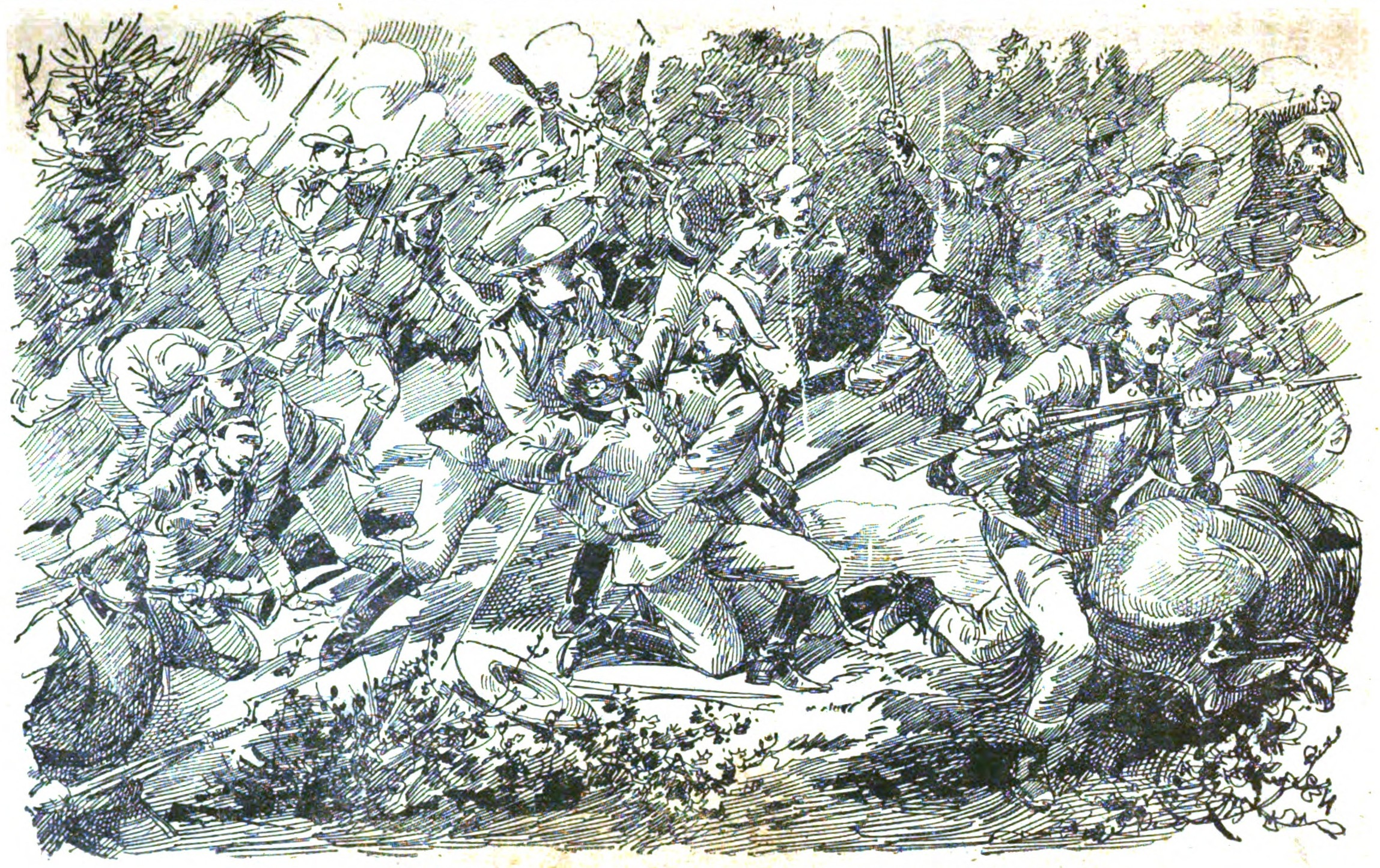
- Death of lieutenant colonel Bosch in the battle (Spanish illustration from 1895)
| Date | May 13, 1895 |
| Location | El Jobito, Oriente Province, Cuba |
| Result | Cuban victory. Consolidation of the war. |

Belligerents
| Cuban rebels | Spain |

Commanders and leaders
| Antonio Maceo; José Maceo; Pedro Agustín Pérez; Victoriano Garzón; Joaquín Planas; Jesús Rabí | Unknown |

Strength
| 2,500 mambises | 505 soldiers |

Casualties and losses
| Unknown | 21 dead and 56 wounded |

The Battle of El Jobito was a military event which took place on May 13 of 1895 in Oriente Province of Cuba, in the Cuban War of Independence.

== Background ==
Neither the Ten Years' War, nor the Little War, had managed to achieve the main objective that those who initiated them had proposed: the total and definitive independence of the island of Cuba from its colonial power, Spain. Between 1880 and 1895, Cuba entered the period of its history that has become known as the Fertile Truce, also known as the "Turbulent Rest", as it was a time of relative peace and economic prosperity in the colony, although tinged by intermittent uprisings and insurrections, which did not manage to consolidate enough to be considered as new wars of independence.

Once the 1890s began, Cuban exiles or emigrants, most of whom settled in the United States, began to gather around the increasingly prominent figure of José Martí.

In this context, he founded the Partido Revolucionario Cubano (PRC), from October to April 1892, as the only party that brought together all Cubans and non-Cubans who wanted total independence of Cuba, with the additional aim of helping also from Puerto Rico.

It was decided to start the war, with or without conditions conducive of the PRC, which would begin on February 24 of 1895, a day of carnivals and festivals, to surprise the unsuspecting Spanish colonial authorities and facilitate the start of the war. Several of the planned uprisings failed, resulting in the death or capture of some important leaders.

However, the war continued, with the success of the uprisings in the provinces of Oriente and Las Villas, but it did not begin to gain real strength, until the landings of the Maceo Brothers, Martí and Gómez in April. After many vicissitudes, the Maceo, Martí and Gómez, along with other disembarked chiefs, managed to assume command of the Mambi troops, which each day became more numerous with the incorporation of veterans and new recruits.

In this context, the First Eastern Campaign began, in the first days of May 1895, and the Circular Campaign, in June of the same year. The first, commanded by Lieutenant General Antonio Maceo Grajales and the second by Generalissimo Máximo Gómez. The Battle of El Jobito, took place on May 13 of 1895, as part of the First Eastern Campaign, it was led by Antonio Maceo.

== The battle ==
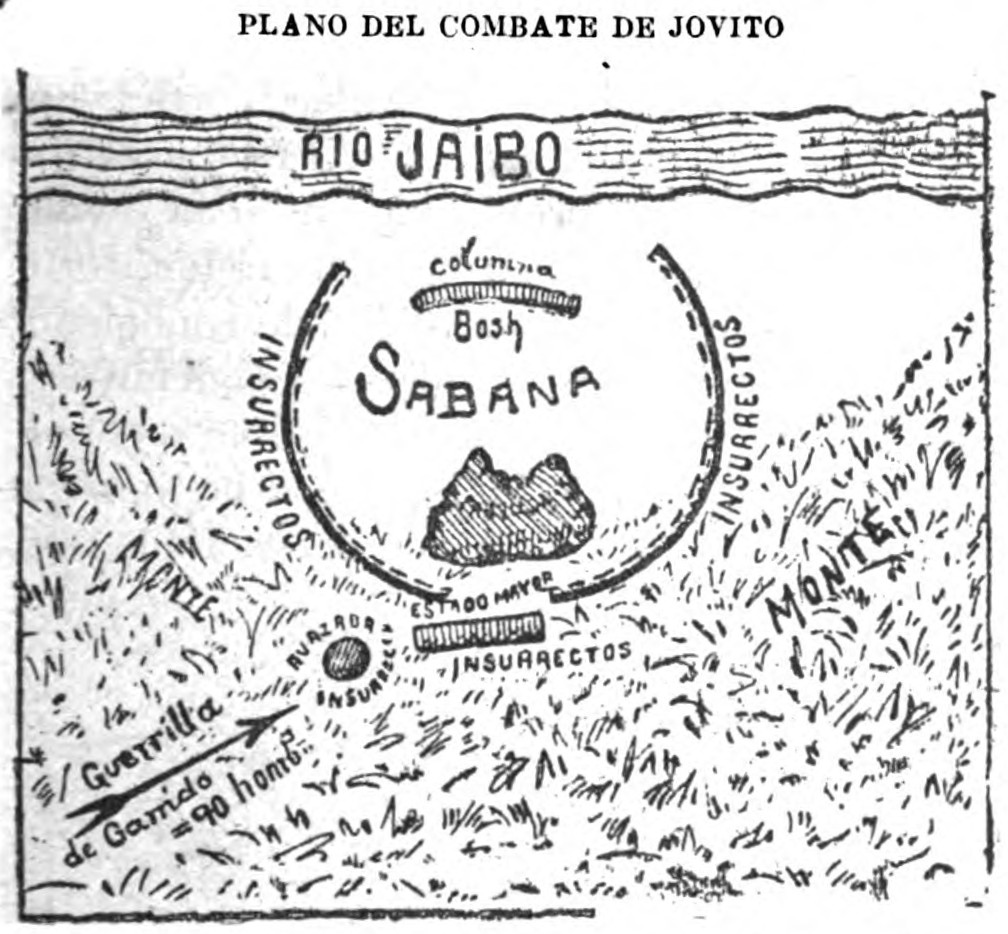
Plan of the battle (1895)

At the farm of “El Jobito”, northwest of Guantánamo, forces under the command of General Antonio Maceo faced a column of more than 500 enemies. Maceo's troops, with their respective leaders, Colonels Joaquín Planas and Victoriano Garzón, Major General José Maceo and Brigadier Pedro Agustín Pérez, camped in the vicinity since the night before, while General Antonio, his escort and the Colonel Jesús Rabí's cavalry, camped in the “Chapala” farm.

At dawn, the advanced Mambisas acted against the Hispanic vanguard in the Cañada de Arroyo Naranjo. The enemy advanced towards the José Maceo camp and occupied the heights, although they were repulsed. General José threw himself against the bulk of the troop, still on the way, while General Antonio placed his forces in a horseshoe position, which allowed him to attack both from the front and from the enemy's flanks, while the Brigadier “ Parakeet ”Pérez closed the retreat.

The Spanish chief had died and the combat had already lasted almost seven hours without the peninsulars being able to break the siege, when the guerrillas from Guaso and the squads from Guantánamo arrived. The Cubans recognized the amount of reinforcement and opened the siege without ceasing to harass the adversary. Maceo tried to ride with Rabí's cavalry, but the enemy withdrew to Guantánamo with a large number of dead and wounded.

== Aftermath ==
The victory of this important battle had as a consequence the rapid consolidation of the Cuban forces in the war that was beginning, as well as the achievement of important military victories, the incorporation of a large number of combatants into the Mambi ranks and the obtaining of new weapons and ammunition.

On the other hand, the Spanish forces, heavily beaten, would take two months to attack the Cuban forces again. It would not be until 13 July 1895, which the Battle of Peralejo would occur, which would also be victorious for Cubans.
