= Alfonso Goulet =

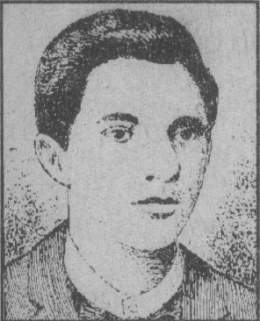
- Born: January 23, 1865; El Cobre, Oriente Province, Captaincy General of Cuba
- Died: July 13, 1895 (aged 30); KIA in the Battle of Peralejo
- Military career
- Allegiance: Cuba
- Branch: Cuban Revolutionary Army
- Service years: 1895
- Rank: Brigadier General
- Conflicts: Cuban War of Independence: Battle of El Jobito; Battle of Peralejo †

Alfonso Goulet Goulet (El Cobre, Oriente, Cuba, January 23, 1865 - Battle of Peralejo, Oriente, Cuba, July 13, 1895) was a Cuban revolutionary leader of the late nineteenth century.

== Biography ==
=== Origins and early life ===
Alfonso Goulet Goulet was born in the town of El Cobre, Oriente, Cuba, on January 23, 1865, being of French descent. In October 1868, the Ten Years' War broke out which was the first war of independence of Cuba. At that time, Goulet was just a child. However, at the outbreak of the Little War, the adolescent Alfonso Goulet spoke in his native region. The Spanish colonial authorities seized him and deported him to Spain for his participation but they did not shoot him considering his young age.

As the years of the Fertile Truce passed, Goulet became linked to the different independence conspiracies in Cuba. He actively participated in the failed conspiracy called Peace of Manganese, in 1890.

=== Cuban War of Independence and death ===
At the outbreak of the Cuban War of Independence on February 24 of 1895, Goulet rose in the vicinity of the town of El Cobre in February and immediately joined the Cuban Revolutionary Army led by then Colonel Jesús Rabí. He was promoted to Commander in April of that same year.

Later, already subordinate to Major General Antonio Maceo, he participated in the Battle of El Jobito, on May 13, 1895 . He was ascending quickly, until reaching the degrees of Brigadier General.

Under the orders of Major General Antonio Maceo, Brigadier Goulet was in charge of protecting the Cuban impedimenta during the bloody Battle of Peralejo, on July 13, 1895. Alfonso Goulet died in combat, in a place known as "La Caoba", while his troops resisted the strong attack of enemy troops. He was 30 years old. It is worth mentioning that the Cuban forces achieved victory in Peralejo despite Goulet's death.
