= Joaquín Vara de Rey y Rubio =

Spanish military officer

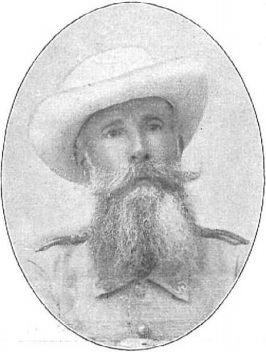
- Born: 14 August 1841; Ibiza, Spain
- Died: 1 July 1898 (aged 56); El Caney, Cuba
- Military career
- Allegiance: Kingdom of Spain
- Branch: Spanish Army
- Service years: 1862–1898
- Rank: Brigadier General
- Conflicts: Carlist Wars; Cuban War of Independence Battle of Loma del Gato; Spanish–American War Battle of El Caney †
- Awards: Laureate Cross of Saint Ferdinand

Governor of the Mariana Islands
- In office 21 April 1890 – 14 August 1891
- Monarch: Alfonso XIII
- Regent: Maria Christina of Austria
- Prime Minister: Práxedes Mateo Sagasta; Antonio Cánovas del Castillo
- Minister of Overseas: Manuel Becerra Bermúdez; Antonio María Fabié
- Governor-General of the Philippines: Valeriano Weyler
- Preceded by: Enrique Solano Llanderal
- Succeeded by: Luis Santos Fontordera

Joaquín Vara de Rey y Rubio (14 August 1841 – 1 July 1898) was a Spanish military officer. He is best known for leading the tenacious defense of El Caney against a massively superior American force during the Spanish–American War.

== Military career ==
Vara de Rey was born on the Balearic island of Ibiza on 14 August 1841. He graduated as a second lieutenant from the Colegio General, rising to the rank of first lieutenant in 1862. During the 1870s he fought the cantonalist uprisings in Cartagena and Valencia and against the Carlists in the Third Carlist War. He requested a transfer to the Philippines in 1884 and remained there until 1890, serving as military political governor of the Mariana Islands and of Zamboanga. In 1891 he was promoted to colonel and returned to Spain, where he was assigned the command of the Ávila garrison.

In 1895, Vara de Rey volunteered for service in Cuba. He commanded the Spanish forces of Bayamo and led his regiment to victory at the Battle of Loma del Gato in which the Spaniards slew revolutionary general José Maceo Grajales, brother of Antonio Maceo Grajales.

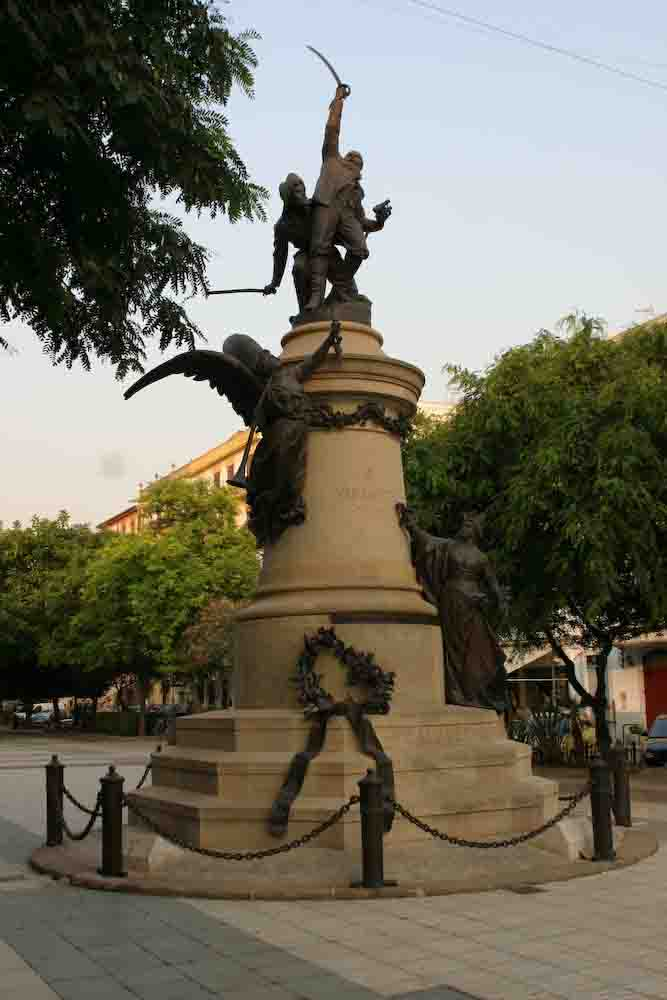
The Joaquín Vara de Rey Memorial in Ibiza, created by sculptor Eduard Alentorn.

On 1 July 1898, during the Spanish-American War, Vara de Rey, by then a brigadier general, with only 550 men and two 80mm mountain guns under his command, heroically defended the village of El Caney for ten hours against the almost seven thousand-strong United States Army 2nd Division under brigadier general Henry Ware Lawton. His well-placed defenses centered around small, well-covered blockhouses arranged so that an enemy attack on an individual blockhouse would draw supporting fire from several others. Vara de Rey lost both a brother and a nephew in the battle and was himself mortally wounded in the fighting; only 84 Spanish soldiers survived and retreated to Santiago de Cuba.

Impressed by his generalship, U.S. troops buried Vara de Rey with full military honors. American accounts of the campaign praised the "magnificent courage" of Vara de Rey's soldiers and described the man as "an incomparable leader; a heroic soul." Vara de Rey's remains were repatriated to Spain in November 1898 with American cooperation. He was posthumously awarded the Laureate Cross of Saint Ferdinand, Spain's highest military decoration.
