= Fidel Alonso de Santocildes =

Spanish general (1844–1895)

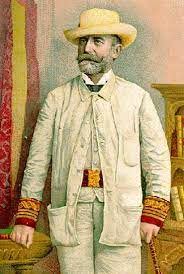
- Born: 1844; Cubo de Bureba, Burgos, Spain
- Died: July 13, 1895 (aged 50–51); Peralejo, Oriente, Cuba
- Military career
- Allegiance: Spain
- Branch: Spanish Army
- Service years: 1859 – 1895
- Rank: General de brigada
- Conflicts: Dominican Restoration War; Ten Years' War; Little War; Cuban War of Independence: First Eastern Campaign; Battle of Peralejo †
- Awards: Order of San Fernando

Fidel Alonso de Santocildes (1844 – July 13, 1895) was a Spanish Brigadier General and war hero of the Ten Years' War, the Little War and Cuban War of Independence. He was notable for his extensive service during the colonial period of Cuba and was a recipient of the Order of San Fernando. However, he was killed during the Battle of Peralejo, suffering a mortal wound during the battle.

== Childhood ==
Fidel was born on 1844 at Cubo de Bureba, Province of Burgos as the son of Don Fidel Alonso de Santocildes and Doña Demetria who were a farming family that produced cereals, vegetables, wine, cheese and wool. He spent his first ten years in Spain, learning the Latin Alphabet, attending school, engaging in childhood activities and helping his parents in the farm. During his teenage years, he studied at the high school at Medina de Pomar and began gaining Castilian nationalism around this time.

== Ten Years' War ==
Initially wanting to attend the San Jerónimo Seminary, he later attended the Toledo Military College where he entered at the age of 15. During which, he entered the Antequera Battalion until March 28, 1869, when he volunteered to serve in an expeditionary army that landed on Manzanillo on March 29, 1869, during the Ten Years' War. He would operate around the Central and Jiguaní regions as well as the Gulf of Guacanayabo but due to disease within the island, more lives would be lost from disease than from enemy bullets. In 1870, Colonel Arsenio Martínez Campos and Captain Bouza Cobreiro praised Santocildes' service for his sorties at Baire and captured the camps of Cambute, Silencio, Lomas de Perucho, Fonseca and Guira during the actions of Piedra de Oro, Faldón and Las Cajitas. His service in these engagements earned him the Cross of Military Merit with the red decoration in 1871.

Around this time, Santocildes was described as having indomitable energy, always seeing the first in dangerous situations and gaining compliance via military discipline. He received his second Cross of Military Merit in 1875 along with a promotion to Commander but transferred to the San Quintín Battalion. During the last 4 years of the Ten Years' War, Santocildes was recorded to engage in over 100 actions which made the Battalion a feared unit among the Mambises. For his further actions and services, he received the Order of San Fernando but after the Pact of Zanjón, he entered a more passive position, being stationed at the barracks of Havana. He then returned to the Oriente Province with the Cazadores de Chiclana Battalion to deal with the Little War and remained there until 1881, guarding the coasts and dealing with military and political manners at Baracoa and Guantánamo.

== Interim Years ==
After the war, Santocildes married Doña Dolores Miyares y Hernández who belonged to a prominent Cuban family and they would have two daughters and one son with the latter attending the Toledo Military Academy as a Second Lieutenant but had to return to Spain by 1881 as he received command of the 1st Battalion of the Aragón Infantry Regiment at Tortosa. He would remain in Catalonia for three years, briefly having to go to Seo de Urgel to prevent a Republican movement there. After Ramón Fajardo Izquierdo was made the Captain General of Puerto Rico, Santocildes became the Lieutenant Colonel of the Aragón Infantry Regiment until returning to Cuba and being transferred back to the San Quintín Battalion in 1886 and promoted to Colonel in 1889.

== Cuban War of Independence ==
Santocildes would then take command of the Reina y de Isabel la Católica Regiments as well as the Havana Public Order Battalion. During his second tenure at Cuba, he would be the military commander of Holguín and Manzanillo. He was then promoted to Brigadier General on May 22, 1895, and took command of a brigade of the 2nd Military District on July 25, 1895, upon the outbreak of the Cuban War of Independence. During the war, he personally told Antonio Maceo Grajales that he was the most capable officer he had ever faced. However, Santocildes would be killed at the Battle of Peralejo as he was mortally wounded as he received two bullets in the chest. Disregarding the urges of his soldiers as one said: "You are wounded, my General!", he responded undaunted: "It's nothing my children, two scratches", "Go ahead! Fire!"
