= Francisco de Borja Canella y Secades =

Spanish general (1847–1906)

Benemérita de la Patria Francisco de Borja Canella y Secades
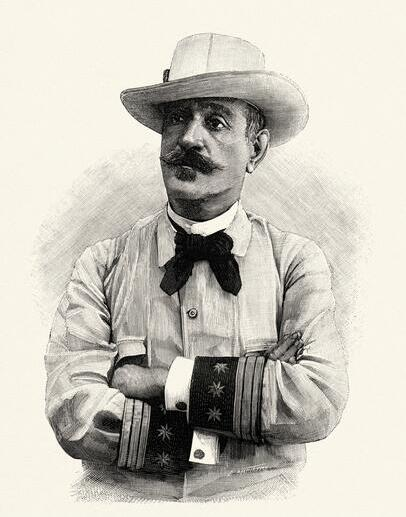
- Born: October 10, 1847; Oviedo, Asturias, Spain
- Died: February 8, 1906 (aged 58); Córdoba, Province of Córdoba, Spain
- Education: University of Oviedo
- Military career
- Allegiance: Spain
- Branch: Spanish Army
- Service years: 1868–1906
- Rank: General de División
- Conflicts: Glorious Revolution: Battle of Alcolea; Ten Years' War; Cuban War of Independence: Battle of Sao del Indio

Francisco de Borja Canella y Secades was a Spanish Divisional General during the 19th century. He was famously known as the "Hero of Sao del Indio" for his service during the Battle of Sao del Indio of the Cuban War of Independence and earned the Laureate Cross of San Fernando for his service there.

== Origin ==
Francisco was born on October 10, 1847, at Oviedo as the son of Benito Canella Meana and Carlota Secades Fernández. His father was a graduate from the University of Oviedo in Law and was a professor and Secretary of the faculty. After being Commander of the Oviedo National Militia in 1843, he was a member of the Dynastic Left party of José Posada Herrera. He was a provincial deputy and civil Governor of the Balearic Islands, Guipúzcoa and Santander.

Francisco de Borja had two brothers: César (born 1844) and Fermín (born 1849). After studying at the University of Oviedo and the Seminary of Vergara, he entered the Toledo Infantry College, where he was assigned as a sergeant within the Mallorca Infantry Regiment.

== Military career ==
In 1868 he was promoted to Ensign and participated in the Battle of Alcolea, under the orders of the Marquis of Novaliches who, supporting Isabel II, tried to contain General Francisco Serrano in his march to Madrid. Despite being defeated, he was awarded the rank of Lieutenant for his service deemed to be gallant.

While the triumph of the Glorious Revolution was taking place, the Ten Years' War began in Cuba. After requesting his transfer to Cuba in August 1869, he was assigned to the Hernán Cortés Expeditionary Battalion, disembarking in Cienfuegos on October 17. During the war, he participated in the battles of San Lorenzo, Guisa, San Diego, Candelaria, Cubitas and others. In July 1871, he was promoted to captain and assigned him as head of the mounted force of the Order battalion. Due to the merits obtained from him in the battle of Potrero de Santa Clara, he was promoted to Commander. Being in front of the Cartagena column made up of seven hundred men distributed in two squadrons of the Civil Guardand four mounted companies, he defeated the Cubans in the battles of Cabeza de Toro, Cañada del Pez, Lequeitio, Redonda and Rincón between September and November 1873. For these actions he was promoted to Lieutenant Colonel. In June 1876, he worked under the orders of Captain General Joaquín Jovellar as an aide-de-camp in Havana. From there he collaborated by sending articles to be published in the newspaper El Faro Asturiano de Oviedo.

An illness forced him to return to Spain. In Oviedo, he was appointed commander of the Caja de Recruitas and published in the newspapers El Carbayón and La Ilustración Gallega y Asturiana. In 1883, he traveled to the Philippines where he was in charge of the local government in Joló for a year. He returned to Spain in October 1884 and was sent to the Villanueva de la Serena battalion and later to Granada. He later returned to the Philippines and in July 1888, he arrived at the Mindanao Regiment, where he was promoted to Colonel. After two years serving there, he moved to Manila and founded the newspaper El Ejército de Filipinas.

== Cuban War of Independence ==
In 1893, he returned to Spain where he was in charge of various regiments. But in less than two years in February 1895, the Cuban War of Independence broke out and he requested his incorporation into the Spanish forces stationed there. Embarking on Santander, Cantabria on March 20 in the steamer Ciudad de Santander, he arrived at Cuba where he headed for Sagua de Tánamo. From there, he would achieve various victories in the battles of Bijaru, Dos Bocas, Quemado, Monte Verde, Río Filipinas, Río Jaibo and Río Mayari.

On August 31, 1895, under the command of eight hundred and fifty infantry soldiers, and an artillery piece, he was victorious in the Battle of Sao del Indio. The battle lasted eight hours. The balance of the insurgent army, with three thousand five hundred men under the command of the brothers, both Generals Antonio and José Maceo left thirty-six dead and eighty wounded. For this victory, he was promoted to Brigadier General on October 6.

== Final years ==
His victorious streak continued with the destruction of the insurgent camp of La Piedra on September 16 and for his victory at the Battle of El Palmito on December 13 thanks to which he received the Laureate Cross of San Fernando. He also scored victories at the Battles of Candelaria and Pozo Hondo in February 1896 which earned his promotion to Divisional General.

In March 1896 however, he would return to Spain, the Oviedo City Council presented him with a sword with a handle made of gold, silver and other precious stones and the poet José Quevedo published a poem recounting the exploits of General Canella. After being a brigade chief in two divisions of the First Army Corps until April 1898 and member of the War Advisory Board until February 1899, he moved to Córdoba, Andalusia where he died in February 1906.

== Awards ==
- Cross of Military Merit, Red and White Cross
- Royal and Military Order of San Hermenegildo, Cross and Plaque
- Cross of Military Merit
- Cuban Campaign Medal, Six Pins
- Royal and Military Order of San Hermenegildo, Grand Cross
