= Jesús Rabí =

Cuban soldier and patriot (1845–1915)

- Born: June 24, 1845; Jiguaní, Oriente Province, Captaincy General of Cuba
- Died: December 5, 1915 (aged 70); Baire, Oriente Province, Cuba
- Military career
- Allegiance: Cuba
- Branch: Cuban Revolutionary Army
- Service years: 1868 – 1915
- Rank: Major General
- Conflicts: Ten Years' War; Little War; Cuban War of Independence: First Eastern Campaign; Battle of El Jobito; Battle of Peralejo; Second Eastern Campaign; Battle of Guisa; Battle of El Caney; Battle of San Juan Hill

Jesús “Rabí” Sablón Moreno (June 24, 1845 – December 5, 1915) was a Cuban soldier and patriot of the 19th century.

== Biography ==
=== Origins and early years ===
Jesus "Rabbi" Sablon Moreno was born in the village of Jiguaní, in eastern Cuba, on 24 June 1845. He came from a humble family of peasants, his father being the Dominican Carlos Sablón Mañach and his mother the Cuban jiguanisera María Moreno. Jesus and his brothers received little education, due to the economic conditions of the family. What little they could learn was taught to them by their father. The nickname "Rabbi" was inherited from his father, who was also called that. Likewise, his brothers were also known by that nickname, which means "teacher."

=== Ten Years' War ===
Finally, on October 10, 1868, after many conspiracies, the Cry of Yara occurred, the outbreak of the Ten Years' War which was the first war for the independence of Cuba. Rabí took up arms against the Spanish colonial authorities in the Las Tunas region, remaining subordinate under the orders of General Donato Mármol. He participated in the assault on his hometown, a few days later and later took part in the First Charge to the Machete, on October 26, 1868. During the war, Rabí fought under the orders of Generals Máximo Gómez, Luis Figueredo, Calixto García and Antonio Maceo. With degrees of Captain, he was head of the escort of the President of the Republic in Arms; Carlos Manuel de Céspedes. In January 1874, he received the degree of Commander. In September 1874, Rabí was one of the few men who were in Major General Calixto García's camp, when he was surprised by enemy troops and captured seriously wounded. Despite their best efforts, Cuban forces were unable to prevent the general's capture. On April 26, 1875, Rabí was one of the officers of the Cuban Liberation Army who supported the Sedition of Lagunas de Varona, led by Major General Vicente García González. However, several days later, he rectified his mistake and withdrew his support. At the end of 1876, Rabí fought between the cities of Manzanillo and Santiago de Cuba. On February 10, 1878, the Zanjón Pact was signed between the Spanish colonial authorities and several senior Cuban officials, which ended the war without recognizing the independence of Cuba. This fact greatly outraged many Cuban officials, especially orientals and villagers.

Rabí was among the group of oriental officers who met with Major General Antonio Maceo, on March 8, 1878, to decide the continuation of the war, which was unanimously approved. The following March 15, Maceo and the officers who followed him refused to accept any pact that did not contemplate independence during the Baraguá Protest. After this protest, Rabí was promoted to Colonel and fought under the orders of Generals Manuel de Jesús Calvar and Guillermón Moncada, but the war was already lost and in a few months it ended irretrievably.

=== The Little War and the Fertile Truce ===
However, the Cuban patriots were not satisfied with peace without independence, so they continued to conspire and, in August 1879, the second war for the independence of Cuba broke out, which would come to be known as the Little War, because it did not manage to gain sufficient strength and organization. Rabí took up arms on October 5, 1879, in his hometown, and fought until the premature end of the war.

After the ominous end of this second war, the Cuban patriots continued to conspire and Rabí continued to be linked to these conspiracies. Proof of this was his active participation in the failed conspiracy that came to be known as the Paz del Manganeso. Later, Rabí joined the Cuban Revolutionary Party, headed by José Martí, which unified all the people who wanted the independence of Cuba and Puerto Rico.

=== The Cuban War of Independence ===
Finally, by order of the Party, on February 24, 1895, the Cuban War of Independence broke out which was the third war for the independence of Cuba. Rabí, for his part, pretended to have risen up in his native region to demand autonomy, instead of independence, since autonomism was legal at that time. He did this to buy time, while the main Cuban leaders, who were in exile, arrived in Cuba .

After Maceo's arrival from Costa Rica, Rabí placed himself under his orders in mid-April. Under his orders, Rabí participated in the First Eastern Campaign, between May and August 1895. He fought in the Battle of El Jobito, on May 13 and, days later, was promoted to Brigadier General (Brigadier). Later, on July 13, he fought in the Battle of Peralejo.

In the final months of 1895, he assumed the interim command of the Second Corps of the Cuban Liberation Army, replacing Major General Bartolomé Masó. After much fighting, Rabbi was promoted to Major General on December 16, 1896.

The year 1897 was very eventful for General Rabí, as he participated in the Second Eastern Campaign, led by Lieutenant General Calixto García. As part of this campaign, Rabí fought in his native town of Jiguaní and in neighboring Baire (both in March), in addition to taking part in the Third Taking of Las Tunas (August) and in the Battle of Guisa (November).

On April 28, 1898, General Rabí seconded General Calixto García in taking the city of Bayamo. Shortly after, the US military intervention in the Cuban war of independence took place. Rabí, as second to General Calixto, participated with his troops and the US troops in the Battles of El Caney and San Juan Hill, in the summer of 1898.

=== Later years and death ===
With the war over in late 1898, the First US occupation of Cuba began . In this context, General Rabí refused to hold public office until the occupation was ended and the independent Republic was established, which finally happened on May 20, 1902.

In 1906, already during the Second Occupation of Cuba, General Rabí traveled to Havana, the country's capital, to ask US Governor Charles Edward Magoon to restore the country's independence. In 1915, General Rabí joined his signature to the many Cubans who sent a letter to the Catholic Pope to ask for the canonization of Our Lady of Charity.

Major General Jesús Rabí died of natural causes, at his home in Baire, on December 5, 1915, at the age of 70.
