= Battle of Guisa =

Battle in the Cuban Revolution

- Part of the Cuban Revolution
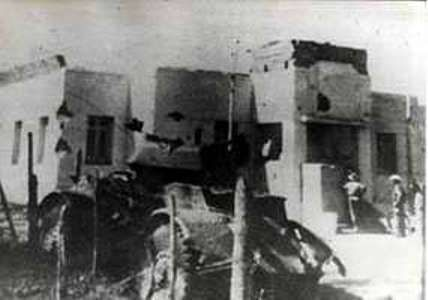
- Batista army garrison captured by Castro rebel forces, Guisa, Cuba. December 1958
Date	20 November 1958
Location	Guisa, Cuba
Result	26th of July movement victory

Belligerents
Republic of Cuba	26th of July Movement

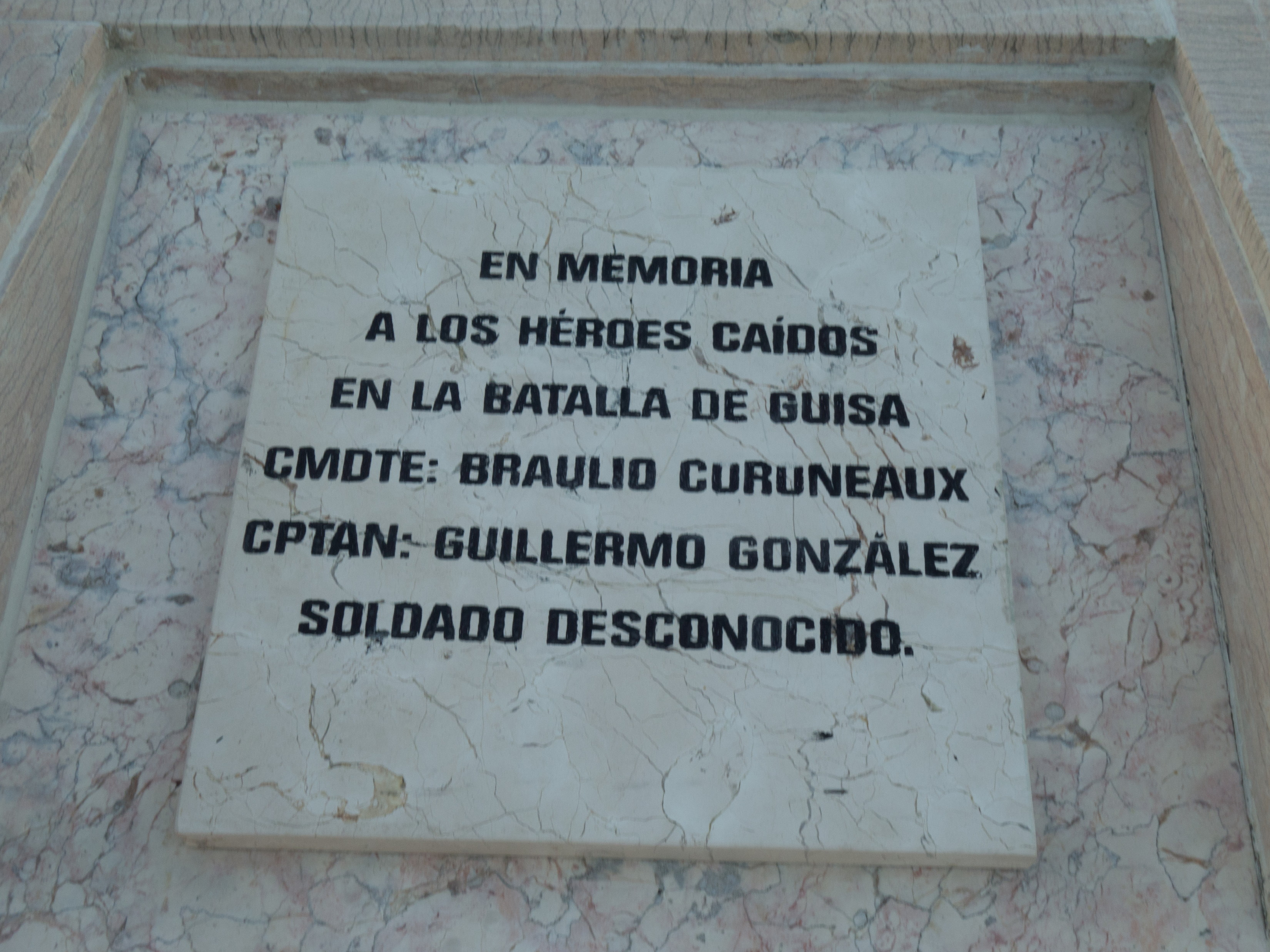
Memorial of the battle of Guisa in Guisa, Granma province, Cuba

The Battle of Guisa was a relevant event in the history of Cuba. One of the major victories of the Rebel Army in the Liberation War (1956–1959) sustained against the dictatorship of Fulgencio Batista in Cuba.

== Background ==
On the morning of November 20, 1958, a convoy of the Batista soldiers began its usual journey from Guisa. Shortly after leaving that town, located in the northern foothills of the Sierra Maestra, the rebels attacked the caravan.

=== Zone of Operations ===
Guisa was 12 kilometers from the Command Post of the Zone of Operations, located on the outskirts of the city of Bayamo. Nine days earlier, Fidel Castro had left the La Plata Command, beginning an unstoppable march east with his escort and a small group of combatants. (Note: Sierra Maestra, Dic. 1, 58 2 y 45 p.m. Coronel García Casares: I am writing these lines to inquire about a man of ours [Lieutenant Orlando Pupo] who was almost certainly taken prisoner by your forces. The event happened like this: after the Army units withdrew, I sent a vanguard to explore in the direction of the Furnace. Further back I set off on the same road where our vanguard was going. By chance said vanguard had taken another road and came to the road behind us. As I expected, I sent a man to catch up with her to tell her to stop before reaching the Furnace. The messenger left with the belief that it was going ahead and therefore would be completely unnoticed of the danger; He was also traveling on horseback, with the consequent noise of his footsteps. Once the error was discovered, everything possible was done to warn him of the situation, but he had already reached the danger zone. They waited several hours for him and he did not return. Today it has not appeared. A gunshot was also heard at night. I am sure that he was taken prisoner; I confess that even the fear that he would have been later killed. I'm worried about the shot that was heard. And I know that when it is a post that fires it is never limited to a single shot in these cases. I have been explicit in the narration of the incident so that you can have sufficient evidence. I hope I can count on your chivalry, to prevent that young man from being assassinated uselessly, if he was not killed last night. We all feel special affection for that partner and we are concerned about his fate. I propose that you return him to our lines, as I have done with hundreds of military personnel, including numerous officers. Military honor will win with that elemental gesture of reciprocity. "Politeness, does not remove the brave". Many painful events have occurred in this war because of some unscrupulous or honorable military personnel, and believe me that the Army needs men and gestures to compensate for those blemishes. It is because I have a high opinion of you that I decide to talk to you about this case, in the assurance that you will do what is within your power. If some formal inconvenience arises, it can be done in the form of an exchange, for one or more of the soldiers we took prisoner during the action of Guisa. Sincerely, Fidel Castro R.) On November 19 the rebels arrived in Santa Barbara. By that time, there were approximately 230 combatants. Castro gathers his officers to organize the siege of Guisa, and orders to place a mine on the Monjarás bridge, over the Cupeinicú river.

That night the combatants made a camp in Hoyo de Pipa, in the early morning, they took the path that runs between the Heliografo hill and the Mateo Roblejo hill, where they occupied strategic positions.

In the meeting on the 20th, the Batista army lost a truck, a bus, and a jeep, six were killed and 17 were made prisoners, three of them wounded. At around 10:30 am, the military Command Post located in the Zone of Operations in Bayamo sends a reinforcement made up of Co. 32, plus a platoon from Co. L and another platoon from Co. 22. This force is unable to advance for the resistance of the rebels. Fidel orders the mining of another bridge over a tributary of the Cupeinicú River. Hours later the army sends a platoon from Co. 82 and another platoon from Co. 93, supported by a T-17 tank. (Note: The following is an excerpt from a Dec. 1, 1958, speech by Fidel Castro, broadcast on the Rebel Army’s radio station, which reported on the victory of the revolutionary forces in the battle of Guisa in the Sierra Maestra mountains, one of the turning points in the revolutionary war that spelled the doom of the Batista dictatorship. A month later the dictatorship collapsed and Rebel Army forces entered Havana: “Yesterday at 9 p.m., after ten days of intense combat, our forces entered Guisa; the battle took place within sight of Bayamo, where the dictatorship has its command center and the bulk of its forces: “The action at Guisa began at exactly 8:30 a.m. on November 20 when our forces intercepted an enemy patrol that made the trip from Guisa to Bayamo on a daily basis. The patrol was turned back, and that same day the first enemy reinforcements arrived. At 4:00 p.m. a T-17 thirty-ton tank was destroyed by a powerful land mine: the impact of the explosion was such that the tank was thrown several meters through the air, falling forward with its wheels up and its cab smashed in on the pavement of the road. Hours before that, a truck full of soldiers had been blown up by another mine. At 6:00 p.m. the reinforcements withdrew. “On the following day, the enemy advanced, supported by Sherman tanks, and was able to reach Guisa, leaving a reinforcement in the local garrison. “On the 22nd, our troops, exhausted from two days of fighting, took up positions on the road from Bayamo to Guisa. “On the 23rd, an enemy troop tried to advance along the road from Corojo and was repulsed. On the 25th, an infantry battalion, led by two T-17 tanks, advanced along the Bayamo-Guisa road, guarding a convoy of fourteen trucks. “At two kilometers from this point, the rebel troops fired on the convoy, cutting off its retreat, while a mine paralyzed the lead tank. “Then began one of the most violent combats that has taken place in the Sierra Maestra. Inside the Guisa garrison, the complete battalion that came in reinforcement, along with two T-17 tanks, was now within the rebel lines. At 6:00 p.m., the enemy had to abandon all its trucks, using them as a barricade tightly encircling the two tanks. At 10:00 p.m., while a battery of mortars attacked them, rebel recruits, armed with picks and shovels, opened a ditch in the road next to the tank that had been destroyed on the 20th, so that between the tank and the ditch, the other two T-17 tanks within the lines were prevented from escaping. “They remained isolated, without food or water, until the morning of the 27th when, in another attempt to break the line, two battalions of reinforcements brought from Bayamo advanced with Sherman tanks to the site of the action. Throughout the day of the 27th the reinforcements were fought. At 6:00 p.m., the enemy artillery began a retreat under cover of the Sherman tanks, which succeeded in freeing one of the T-17 tanks that were inside the lines; on the field, full of dead soldiers, an enormous quantity of arms was left behind, including 35,000 bullets, 14 trucks, 200 knapsacks, and a T-17 tank in perfect condition, along with abundant 37-millimeter cannon shot. The action wasn’t over—a rebel column intercepted the enemy in retreat along the Central Highway and caused it new casualties, obtaining more ammunition and arms. “On the 28th, two rebel squads, led by the captured tank, advanced toward Guisa. At 2:30 a.m. on the 29th, the rebels took up positions, and the tank managed to place itself facing the Guisa army quarters. The enemy, entrenched in numerous buildings, gave intense fire. The tank’s cannon had already fired fifty shots when two bazooka shots from the enemy killed its engine, but the tank’s cannon continued firing until its ammunition was exhausted and the men inside lowered the cannon tube. Then occurred an act of unparalleled heroism: rebel Lieutenant Leopoldo Cintras Frías, who was operating the tank’s machine gun, removed it from the tank, and despite being wounded, crawled under intense crossfire and managed to carry away the heavy weapon. “Meanwhile, that same day, four enemy battalions advanced from separate points: along the road from Bayamo to Guisa, along the road from Bayamo to Corojo, and along the one from Santa Rita to Guisa. “All of the enemy forces from Bayamo, Manzanillo, Yara, Estrada Palma, and Baire were mobilized to smash us. The column that advanced along the road from Corojo was repulsed after two hours of combat. The advance of the battalions that came along the road from Bayamo to Guisa was halted, and they encamped two kilometers from Guisa; those that advanced along the road from Corralillo were also turned back. “The battalions that encamped two kilometers from Guisa tried to advance during the entire day of the 30th; at 4:00 p.m., while our forces were fighting them, the Guisa garrison abandoned the town in hasty flight, leaving behind abundant arms and armaments. At 9:00 p.m., our vanguard entered the town of Guisa. Enemy supplies seized included a T-17 tank—captured, lost, and recaptured; 94 weapons (guns and machine guns, Springfield and Garand); 12 60-millimeter mortars; one 91-millimeter mortar; a bazooka; seven 30-caliber tripod machine guns; 50,000 bullets; 130 Garand grenades; 70 howitzers of 60- and 81-millimeter mortar; 20 bazooka rockets; 200 knapsacks, 160 uniforms, 14 transport trucks; food; and medicine. “The army took two hundred losses counting casualties and wounded. We took eight compañeros who died heroically in action, and seven wounded. “A squadron of women, the ‘Mariana Grajales,’ fought valiantly during the ten days of action, resisting the aerial bombardment and the attack by the enemy artillery. “Guisa, twelve kilometers from the military port of Bayamo, is now free Cuban territory.”) When crossing the bridge over a tributary of the Cupeinicú river, the T-17 tank was blown up by the rebel mine and was left with its wheels up in the air. In this confrontation, the Batista army suffers 14 dead, 18 wounded and 23 prisoners and 29 rifles, two 30-caliber machine guns, and tank weapons were captured.

Meanwhile, to the west, following the El Corojo road towards the Monjarás bridge, which by then was inoperative, Batista sent a platoon of infantry. It was also rejected. There were several casualties and six prisoners.

On November 21, Castro decided to set up a cave as a hospital in Santa Bárbara and establish his Command Post along with the Cupeyal village, on the San Andrés hill. At midmorning of that day, the Batista army sent another group supported by a Sherman tank. This reinforcement penetrates Guisa, reinforces the garrison of the local barracks with a platoon, and retreats to the city of Bayamo. On November 23, an] Batista army company tried to force positions along the road from El Corojo to Santa Bárbara, but it was violently rejected and suffered numerous casualties.

=== Army defeat ===
Although the Batista army concentrated a significant number of soldiers and means of combat in Guisa, the Rebels gave it a defeat from which it could not recover. The Chief of Operations of the army moved to Bayamo the companies 105, 22, L and EC, 81, 101, plus a platoon of Sherman M4 tanks, a battery of 75-millimeter howitzers, the Bon 26 headquarters, and the headquarters. Bon 24. From the town of Estrada Palma -today Bartolomé Masó- the army moved towards Bayamo to Bon 25, companies 52, 63 and 82 and a platoon of tanks; while from the town of Yara he moved Co. 41, the Headquarters of Companies 43 and 44 and 62 and 31, and prepared to deliver a forceful blow. Through a proclamation, Castro asked the civilian population of Guisa to leave the town. It occupied the position to the east of the road and, to the west, where the forces of Captain Coroneaux, which extended to the top of the Heliografo hill. They also have two other elevations occupied, known as the hill of the Cemetery and La Estrella.

=== A second mine ===
Again the army tries to penetrate the road to El Corojo and is pushed back in the Monjarás sector, suffering casualties and four prisoners. The army started another advance with a T-17 tank leading. The troops moved in 14 trucks. The convoy crossed next to the tank destroyed days before, but the rebels had placed another mine just over a kilometer from the bridge.

The second mine exploded almost under the tank, immobilizing it and the soldiers and the convoy are paralyzed. After the outbreak, the rebel attack begins from the hills that surround the road. The soldiers tried to take shelter from the projectiles but had many casualties and they had lost their captain who was coming to the front of the convoy and a Lieutenant of the Co. 32.

Late in the morning, the Chief of the Zone of Operations dispatches to companies 82 and 52, a section of Sherman M-4 heavy tanks and the battery of 75-millimeter howitzers. It also calls for urgent air support with all of the available planes.

In the early morning hours of November 27, one of the reinforcement's T-17 tanks tried to exit through the Cupeinicú river ravine but was trapped by the slope and the mud. The rebels beat the enemy with 81 mortar fire and 30 caliber machine guns.

=== Night attack ===
Castro orders a night attack; at dawn, they retreat to their positions and the army reinforcement arrives, this time preceded by two Sherman M-4 heavy tanks and howitzers. It is fought throughout the day, one of the M-4 tanks manages to tow the T-17 tank, but the other stays down. Four B-26 bombers are sent from Havana. Together with other devices that the army had, the number ten and constantly machine-gun the area. At the height of the combat, the position of Captain Braulio Coroneaux is located by an M-4 tank, which cannons it incessantly. A cannon shot destroys the trench where the captain and other combatants die heroically. Night attack Fidel personally led the battle. In the image, Raúl Castro (left) and Camilo Cienfuegos. Fidel orders another night's attack. The army fights and begins to retreat with sensible losses. The rebel leader, then, orders an ambush to be placed between El Horno and the crossing over the Managua stream. Although a T-17 tank breaks the position and causes two deaths and one wounded, the rebel fire causes the soldiers to abandon three trucks with more than 20,000 30.06 caliber bullets, radio, and 13 automatic rifles.

New recruits were assembled and the action stands out as a great victory for the rebel forces. The Batista army suffered 160 casualties, some 35,000 bullets were seized, 14 trucks, a T-17 tank in perfect condition, and 300 complete backpacks along with other supplies. Castro was sure that the military command was not going to recover so soon from the failure, and he ordered his men to rest and, if possible, bury the dead, but to keep alert of the army. That night he recognized the battlefield, inspected the tank abandoned by the soldiers, and managed to remove it from where it was stuck. With an improvised crew, he decided to use it to attack Guise's barracks, where a large group of soldiers remains. Due to inexperience, the tank falls into a ditch and many of its shots go over the top of the barracks building. But the enemy recovers and renders it useless with one shot, forcing its crew to abandon it. Faced with such a disaster, the enemy reorganizes its forces and means. In the direction of Santa Rita-Guisa, they organize a special battalion in order to advance east towards Guisa. In addition, it creates Tactical Group A with a strength of 1,800 soldiers. Another 1,600, meanwhile, would operate west of the Guise highway with tanks and artillery. The correlation, at that time, is approximately six soldiers for every rebel. Enemy operational plan The army planned to advance with two battalions along the Payarés road to the Monte Oscuro region. The Bon 25 would try to dislodge the rebels that were occupying the hills of San Antonio and Loma de Piedra, while the 14 battalions would advance in the direction of Los Mameyes, leaving on the banks of the Cupeinicú. Co. 91 would advance behind him. At the height of Monte Oscuro, the vehicles of this troop deviate along the road that leads to Monjarás but is surprised by rebel forces who manage to seriously injure the enemy leader. The rest retreat to Bayamo.

On the morning of November 30, the air force machine-gunned and bombarded rebel positions. The tanks and artillery tried to advance but they could not. Moving through the hills, the Special Battalion leaves afternoon to one side of the El Matadero hill, which at that time has no surveillance because the rebel force is facing the Tactical Group. Thus, the Special Battalion managed to enter Guisa and covered the escape, along the road to Los Pajales, of the soldiers from the barracks, their families, and people committed to the dictatorship. Moving across the country, that group exits the Central Highway and continues towards Bayamo. At night, the army begins to withdraw the rest of its troops, and after some skirmishes with rebel forces, they hit the road. At 9:00 p.m. Fidel and the bulk of the combatants entered Guisa. By then, they have repulsed nine enemy counterattacks and successfully executed 18 missions, suffering eight dead, seven wounded and one prisoners. After the battle, the Batista government requested an urgent report on the units that participated and the war material that was lost. The headquarters of the ZO in Bayamo, in secret encryption, explained in detail what happened to evacuate Co. M, surrounded and subjected to strong pressure from the enemy, but minimized the losses in life and weapons. During the days when Fidel and his troops moved from the La Plata Command to Guisa and during the development of the battle, his talents as a strategist, his political vision, and his personal courage were manifested, leading the rebels to victory. . The triumph of the Battle at Guise was an irreparable blow to the tyrant's troops. From it, officers and soldiers were fully convinced of their future defeat.

== See also ==
- Moncada Barracks
- Havana Presidential Palace attack (1957)
- Humboldt 7 massacre
- Attack on El Uvero
- Battle of Yaguajay
