= Cubo de Bureba =

Coordinates: 42°38′N 3°12′W

- Municipality
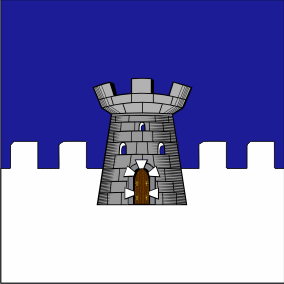
- Flag Coat of arms

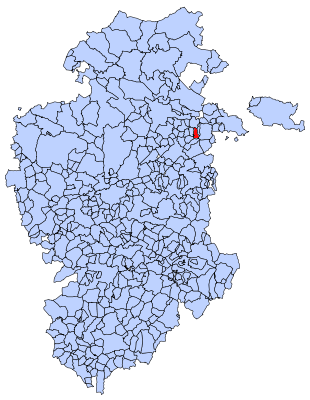
- Municipal location of Cubo de Bureba in Burgos province
- Country: Spain
- Autonomous community: Castile and León
- Province: Burgos
- Comarca: La Bureba

Area
  - Total: 9 km^{2} (3.5 sq mi)
- Elevation: 684 m (2,244 ft)

Population (2025-01-01)
  - Total: 102
  - Density: 11/km^{2} (29/sq mi)
- Time zone: UTC+1 (CET)
  - Summer (DST): UTC+2 (CEST)
- Postal code: 09280
- Website: http://www.cubodebureba.es/

Cubo de Bureba is a municipality located in the province of Burgos, Castile and León, Spain. According to the 2004 census (INE), the municipality has a population of 114 inhabitants.
