= Cauto Embarcadero =

Cauto Embarcadero Cauto del Embarcadero
- Village
- Location of Cauto Embarcadero in Cuba
- Coordinates: 20°32′11″N 76°49′23″W
- Country: Cuba
- Province: Granma
- Municipality: Río Cauto

Area
  - Total: 0.9255 km^{2} (0.3573 sq mi)
- Elevation: 19 m (62 ft)

Population (2012)
  - Total: 4,325
  - Density: 4,673/km^{2} (12,100/sq mi)
- Time zone: UTC-5 (EST)

Cauto Embarcadero is a town in the municipality of Río Cauto, in Granma Province of Cuba. It is located around 27 kilometres (17 mi) northwest of Bayamo, the provincial capital.

== History ==
Cauto del Embarcadero, a rural town, was once part of the municipal district of Bayamo, which belonged to Oriente in Cuba. Positioned about 50 miles from the mouth of the Cauto River, Cuba's longest river, the town of Cauto del Embarcadero could be reached by schooners, highlighting the town's strategic location as a waterfront area used for transportation or trade.

By 1871, the village's population of 620 was consisted of 372 whites, 192 free, and 86 slaves. In the 1899 Census of Cuba, the population was 1,571.

After the 1976 Cuban constitutional referendum, which introduced significant changes to Cuba's administrative divisions, Cauto Embarcadero became a part of the Río Cauto municipality in Granma Province.

The town includes a primary school named after Juan Gualberto Gómez, a government office, a Methodist church, a park, and a cemetery.

== Demographics ==
In 2012, the settlement of Guamo Embarcadero had a population of 4,325.

== Notable residents ==
- Francisco Mendieta Hechavarria

== See also ==
- Municipalities of Cuba
- List of cities in Cuba
