= Flor Crombet =

Cuban Major General (1851–1895)

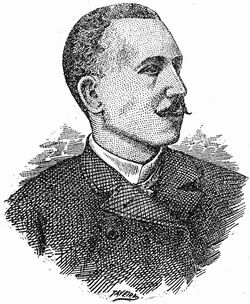
- Born: September 17, 1851; El Cobre, Oriente Province, Cuba
- Died: April 10, 1895 (aged 43); Alto de Palmarito, Oriente Province, Cuba
- Military career
- Allegiance: Cuba
- Branch: Cuban Revolutionary Army
- Service years: 1868 – 1895 (Cuba)
- Conflicts: Ten Years' War; Little War; Cuban War of Independence

Francisco Adolfo "Flor" Crombet Tejera was a Cuban patriot and participated in the three independence conflicts. He was appointed head, in commission, of the division of Cuba and Bayamo and was Major General. He landed with Antonio Maceo Grajales for "Duaba". He participated in the Ten Years' War and protested with Maceo in Mangos de Baraguá in defense of the total and definitive independence of Cuba.

== Biography ==
=== Early years ===
He was born in El Cobre, Santiago de Cuba, Oriente Province, on September 17, 1851 . He was a student of the terrain and of the ordinances and laws of the Cuban Revolutionary Army, for which he distinguished himself as a disciplined and zealous officer of duties.

=== Ten Years' and Little Wars ===
Crombet participated in all 3 campaigns of Cuban independence. It won 20 November 1868 incorporated as a soldier forces Colonel Angel Bárzaga . Ten days later he was subordinated to then-Colonel Jesús Pérez. He earned his ranks on the battlefield .

His fame spread throughout eastern Cuba, especially in Santiago de Cuba and Guantánamo, and he participated in the preparations for the so-called Little War. Some historians affirm that his second surname was Calderín and others state that it was Bayón. He was promoted to corporal second for the attack on Nueva Málaga; out of Primera for the capture of La Dorotea, as second sergeant for the attack on La Matilde, sergeant on July 22, 1869, for the attack on La Aurora, promoted to Ensign for the Defense of the Gurjiay camp, promoted to lieutenant for the taking of Tio Juan, promoted to Captain on September 13, 1869, by taking El Cristal, promoted to Commander in December to August 1871 for service in the Battle of Cafetal La Indiana and finally to Lt. Col. July 24, 1872, for the attack on Shammah.

In July 1873 he was subordinate to Brigadier General Antonio Maceo, head of the second division of the first Oriental body. He was chosen by Major General Máximo Gómez to integrate the first invading contingent at the beginning of 1874. During the combat of Naranjo Mojacasabe ( February 10, 1874) he received a wound on his upper lip that marked him forever. He participated in the Battle of Las Guásimas on March 19, 1874) and in the attack on "Caobillas" ( September 10, 1874), all in the Camagüey Province.

On September 30, 1874, he returned to the East, together with Maceo, to rejoin the Cuba division . (First Corps of the Second Division). On 3 March as 1875 he participated in the attack on wit "Sabanilla". On October 27, 1875, he was promoted to colonel. In January 1876 he attacked and took the village of "Guayabales". In 1877 he was appointed chief of the "Guanimao Regiment" and participated in the attack on "El Cobre" and in the defense of his camp at "El Aguacate".

=== Baraguá Protest ===
He played an active role in the Baraguá Protest, where he reproached Major General Antonio Maceo for granting the interview to the Spanish Captain General Arsenio Martínez Campos, considering that he should not have any contact with the enemy. The provisional government of Baraguá promoted him to brigadier general and appointed him head, in commission, of the division of Cuba and Bayamo. On May 8, 1878, Crombet and his men attacked the village sawmill.

=== Actions Abroad ===
After capitulating, he fled to New York City, United States, to return months later with the aim of organizing a new uprising. When he was preparing for the Little War in the Eastern parts of the island, he was arrested in Santiago de Cuba, on March 13, 1879, and sent to Spain. After 23 months in prison and exile, he managed to escape and settle in Central America.

In Honduras he held the positions of commander general of the department of La Paz, inspector general of barracks and secretary of the supreme court of war and justice, successively, which he resigned in 1884 to dedicate himself to the preparations for a new war of independence in Cuba . In 1890 he had an active participation in the frustrated conspiracy known as "La Paz del Manganeso". Discovered, he was forced to leave for Costa Rica, from where he collaborated in the organization of the "Fernandina Plan".

In the United States, he met José Martí, who appointed him to lead the expedition that would arrive on Cuban shores on April 1, 1895, to restart the Cuban War of Independence.

=== Cuban War of Independence ===
He failed, he left Puerto Limon, Costa Rica on 25 March 1895 in the steamer "Adirondack" to the front of 22 expedition members, among whom were brothers Antonio and José Maceo. After stopping off at Kingston, Jamaica, they headed to Fortuna Island, in The Bahamas, where they boarded the schooner Honor.

They landed on April 1, 1895, at Duaba, near Baracoa, Oriente, being tenaciously pursued by the enemy. On the 8th, an encounter with an ambush mounted by the guerrillas caused the group to disperse.

=== Death ===
From October to April 1895, Crombet fell while fighting in Alto de Palmarito, Baracoa, where the event is remembered and that repeated phrase martiana: "... Flor has a noble heart, sound judgment and think as I think about future destinations of Cuba ".

On June 30, 1899, the executive committee of the Assembly of Representatives of the Cuban revolution, issued diploma Major General on April 1, 1895.
