= Buey River =

River in Cuba

Coordinates: 20°16′01″N 76°46′59″W

Buey River is a river of southern Cuba.

== See also ==
- List of rivers of Cuba
