= Peralejo =

Peralejo (Tagalog: [pɛɾaˈlɛho]) is a Filipino surname that may refer to:

- Heaven Peralejo (born 1999), Filipino actress, model and singer
- Paula Peralejo (born 1984), Filipino former actress
- Rica Peralejo (born 1981), Filipino actress, singer and television host
