= Pedro Agustín Pérez =

Cuban independence political activist (1844–1914)

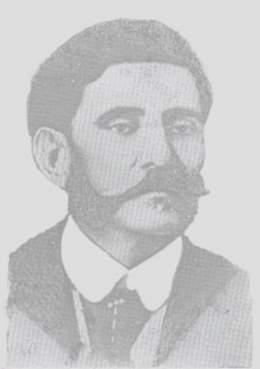

Mayor of Guantánamo
- In office January 1899 – April 21, 1903
- President: Tomás Estrada Palma
- Preceded by: Office Established
- Succeeded by: Unknown

Personal details
- Born: April 20, 1844 Tiguabos, Oriente Province, Captaincy General of Cuba
- Died: April 13, 1914 (aged 69) Boca de Jaibo, Oriente Province, Cuba

Military service
- Allegiance: Spain; Cuba
- Branch: Spanish Army; Cuban Revolutionary Army
- Years of service: 1868 – 1899
- Rank: Major General
- Battles/wars: Ten Years' War; Little War; Cuban War of Independence: Battle of El Jobito

Pedro Agustín Periquito Pérez Pérez, better known as Periquito Pérez (20 April 1844 – 13 April 1914) was a Cuban independence political activist.

== Biography ==
=== Origins and early years ===
Periquito was the son of Eligio Pérez and María Pérez. He came from a well-to-do and tight-knit peasant family with deep loyalty to Spain.

His uncle Miguel was captain and head of the Spanish squads of "Santa Catalina" that determined that later years, before the Ten Years' War, he was incorporated into the troops of the Spanish army, as a volunteer.

In 1862, he married Juana Bautista Pérez Gutiérrez.

In October 1868, the Ten Years' War, the first war of independence of Cuba broke out. By that time, Periquito was already a volunteer in the Spanish army.

=== The Little War and Fertile Truce ===
At the end of the Ten Years' War, Periquito was already showing admiration and respect for the mambises, for which he was convinced by Colonel Silverio del Prado, to join the independence cause. At the outbreak of the Little War, Periquito joined the mambises. However, the participation of Pedro Agustín Pérez in the mambí army during said war is not registered. In December 1879, during said war, he was taken prisoner after an enemy attack on the camp where he was staying and was sent to Santiago de Cuba, where he escaped spectacularly by swimming across the bay.

Incorporated to the troops of Guillermón Moncada, Periquito was promoted to the rank of Commander, degree with which the war ended. Faced with the material impossibility of continuing the fight, Periquito lays down his arms, like all the other mambises, waiting for better conditions to continue. During the so-called Fertile Truce, Periquito continued to conspire with others in favor of the independence of Cuba, to the point that he was appointed leader of the Guantanamo Mambises. Denounced for his activities in 1893, he went into hiding and rose in 1894, months before the start of the Cuban War of Independence.

=== Cuban War of Independence ===
On 24 February 1895, the outbreak of the Necessary War (1895–1898), third war for the independence of Cuba. Periquito had already been raised since 1894 and soon joined the Mambí Army. Periquito's troops searched intensively for the expedition members of the schooner "Honor", who had landed at Duaba in April 1895. Among these expedition members were the brothers Antonio and José Maceo, as well as Flor Crombet, three important Cuban generals.

Once the war was consolidated, towards May 1895, Brigadier Periquito Pérez participated under the orders of Lieutenant General Antonio Maceo, in the Battle of El Jobito, this began his most outstanding performance during the war. In addition to fighting under the orders of Maceo, he also later fought under the orders of Lieutenant General Calixto García.

In 1898, the United States intervened in the war and finished defeating the Spanish army. The 9 of October 1898, General Perez entered triumphantly with his troops in the city of Guantanamo. In January 1899, in response to an old proposal from Calixto García, Pedro Agustín Pérez was promoted to Major General of the Liberation Army. Shortly after, the US military governor of Cuba, Leonard Wood, appointed him as mayor of the city of Guantánamo.

=== Later years and death ===
A little known fact is General Perez was a Grand Mason of the Guantanamo Oriente Masons. His Masonic Ring aided his escape as referenced above. General Perez was elected mayor of his city and later reelected three times. General Pérez resigned from his post on 21 April 21, 1903. He spent the last years of his life on his farm, in Boca de Jaibo. There is where he died of natural causes on 13 April 1914, seven days before his 70th birthday. He passed peacefully while reading his bible and awaiting the coffee his wife, Juana, was making for him.
