= First Eastern Campaign =

Military campaign, part of the Cuban War of Independence

- Part of Cuban War of Independence
Date	May 6 – August 31, 1895
Location	Oriente Province, Cuba

Belligerents
Cuban rebels	Spain

Commanders and leaders
Antonio Maceo; Alfonso Goulet †; Victoriano Garzón; Joaquín Planas; Jesús Rabí	Arsenio Campos; Fidel Santocildes †

The First Eastern Campaign was a military campaign that took place between early May and late August 1895 in Oriente Province of Cuba, in the Cuban War of Independence.

== Background ==
Neither the Ten Years' War (1868–1878), nor the Little War (1879–1880), had managed to achieve the main objective that those who initiated them had proposed: the total and definitive independence of the island of Cuba from its colonial power, Spain.

Between 1880 and 1895, Cuba entered the period of its history that has become known as the Fertile Truce, also known as the “Turbulent Rest”, as it was a time of relative peace and economic prosperity in the colony, although nuanced due to intermittent uprisings and insurrections, which did not manage to consolidate enough to be considered as new wars of independence.

Once the 1890s began, Cuban exiles or emigrants, most of whom settled in the United States, began to gather around the increasingly prominent figure of José Martí. In this context, he founded the Partido Revolucionario Cubano (PRC), on October to April 1892, as the only party that brought together all Cubans and non-Cubans who wanted total independence of Cuba, with the additional aim of helping also from Puerto Rico. With Martí as Delegate (Chief) of the Party, it was decided to appoint Generals Máximo Gómez and Antonio Maceo, as first and second chiefs, respectively, of the future third Cuban war of independence that was being planned. This happened in 1893.

By the end of 1894, all the material and organizational conditions seemed to be well prepared, both inside and outside the island, to start the new war. However, the failure of the Fernandina Plan would become a serious setback for the Cuban independence plans. However, it was decided to start the war, with or without conditions conducive on Sunday 24 of February 1895, a day of carnivals and festivals, to surprise the unsuspecting Spanish colonial authorities and facilitate the start of the war. Several of the planned uprisings failed, resulting in the death or capture of some important leaders.

However, the war continued, with the success of the uprisings in the Oriente and Las Villas provinces, but it did not begin to gain real strength until the landings of the Maceo Brothers, Martí and Gómez in April. After many vicissitudes, the Maceo, Martí and Gómez, along with other disembarked chiefs, managed to assume command of the Mambi troops, which each day became more numerous with the incorporation of veterans and new recruits.

In this context, the First Eastern Campaign began, in the first days of May 1895, and the Circular Campaign, in June of the same year. The first, commanded by Lieutenant General Antonio Maceo and the second by Generalissimo Máximo Gómez.

== Aftermath ==
The victory of this important military campaign had as a consequence, together with the First Eastern Campaign of Antonio Maceo, the rapid consolidation of Cuban forces in the war that was beginning, as well as the achievement of important military victories, the incorporation of a large number of combatants to the mambisas ranks and obtaining new weapons and ammunition.

After the successful conclusion of both military campaigns, the Assembly of Jimaguayú took place in September 1895, in which the Government of the Republic of Cuba in Arms was again constituted (which had been dissolved at the end of the Ten Years War, in 1878 ), with which the Revolution was endowed with a political and judicial apparatus .
