= José Maceo =

Cuban independence activist and patriot

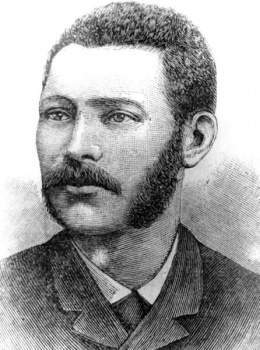
- Born: February 2, 1849; Santiago de Cuba, Oriente Province, Captaincy General of Cuba
- Died: July 5, 1896 (aged 47); Loma de Gato, Santiago de Cuba, Cuba
- Burial place: Santa Ifigenia Cemetery, Santiago de Cuba, Cuba
- Military career
- Allegiance: Cuba
- Branch: Cuban Liberation Army
- Service years: 1859 – 1896
- Conflicts: Ten Years' War; Little War; Cuban War of Independence

José Marcelino Maceo Grajales (2 February 1849, La Delicia, Oriente Province, Cuba – 5 July 1896, Loma de Gato, Santiago de Cuba) was a Cuban independence activist and patriot.

== Biography ==
=== Early years and personality ===
José was the third of the offspring of the Maceo Grajales family.

At the age of 19, he began his military career in the Ten Years' War, rising from soldier to colonel, a rank that was awarded to him after the Baraguá Protest. People who knew him or fought under his command described him as stocky and slim, with a hard look and a stern frown, with great poise, a sweet smile and very concerned for the last of his soldiers. He was a jovial, sincere, disinterested, conceited person, of great musical sensitivity, especially with the guitar. However, others believe that he was sometimes very temperamental and easily angered, which even led him to a duel with Guillermón Moncada. On some occasions he massacred Spanish prisoners and did not listen to other mambises who asked him to act according to the codes of honor. He was described by others to be very brave, always the first in battle, but irascible and lacking in patience, José was also described to be one of the most contradictory patriots among the Cuban ranks.

=== Revolutionary Activity ===
The use of the rifle, the handling of the machete as a weapon to defend himself, the agility as a horseman, and the maturity of his thought were influential factors in his becoming a true warrior very soon. Simple family development, in which honesty and love of freedom were a permanent presence, shaped his personality. Of his family, he was the only one who participated in the three wars for national independence and in them accumulated an extensive service record and several scars on his body.

He gained notoriety and military prominence, which made him earn the rank of general in April 1895. As Antonio, he was an active participant in the Invasion of Guantanamo and fought in actions such as Rejendón de Báguanos.

He remained at the side of his brother Antonio in the Baraguá Protest. His revolutionary battle did not even rest during the so-called "Fertile Truce", since it was one of the Cubans who did not stop conspiring for independence abroad and thus he was seen actively participating in the Plan of San Pedro Sula, from 1884 to 1886 .

Together with Antonio he disembarked by Duaba, to restart the Cuban War of Independence where the fighting took place in the Oriente Province.

Separated from his companions after the Alto de Palmarito fight, he crossed maniguas and streams until he managed to contact the Guantanamo Mambises; then he met Martí, Gómez, and the brave men who had landed at Playitas. On April 25, he beat an enemy column in Arroyo Hondo; three days later, he was awarded the stars of Major General. José and his brother Antonio Maceo obtained an important victory in the Battle of Sao del Indio, on August 31, 1895.

=== Death ===
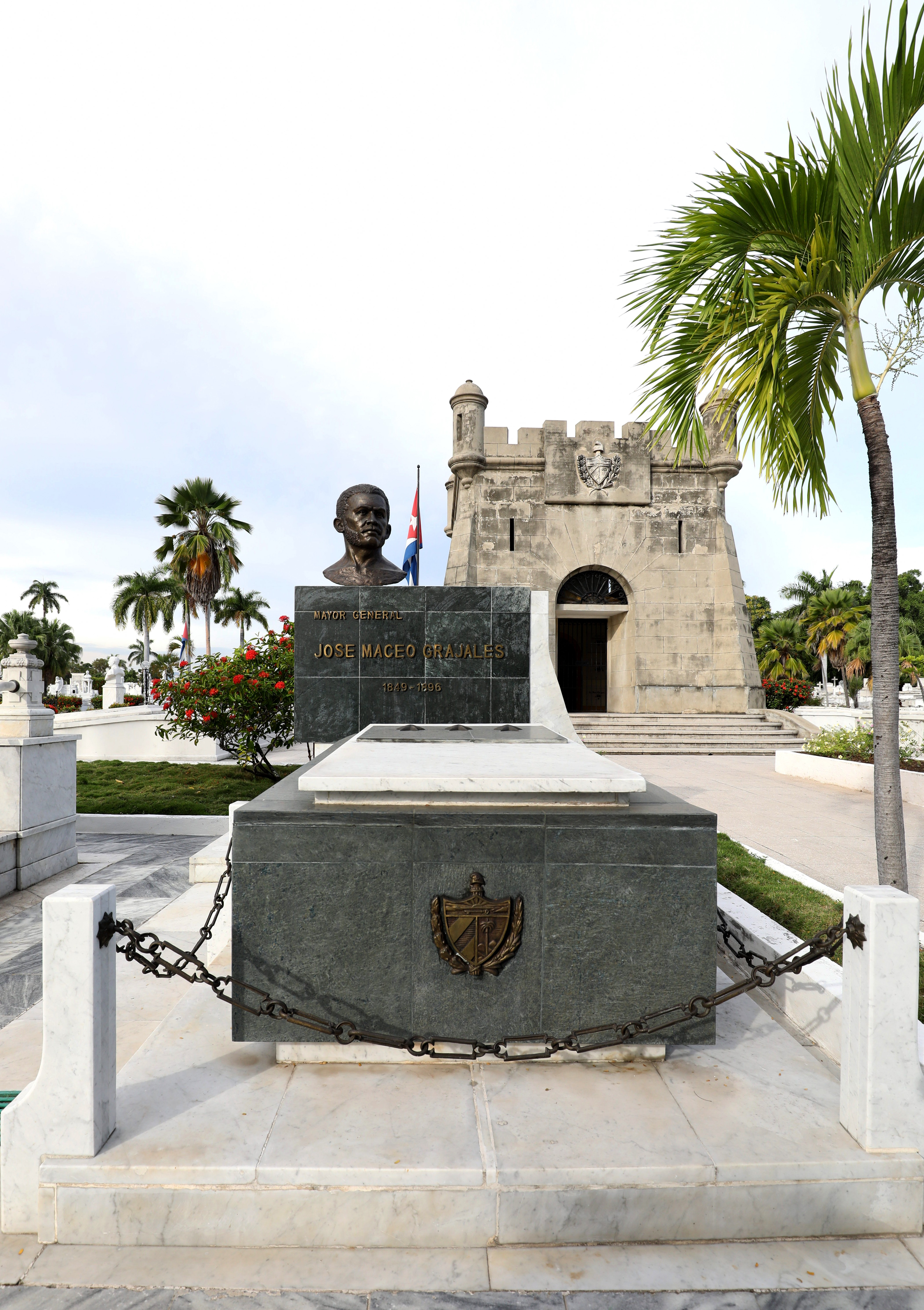
tomb of José Maceo

In the eastern parts, Maceo was with his struggling troops when on July 5, 1896 he engaged in fierce combat with Spanish forces. Shortly after the fight began, the soldiers, astonished, saw how the general collapsed from his horse, dropping the revolver he had in his right hand.

Mortally wounded, he was treated by his doctor who gave no hope of life. A few hours later he died, leaving a great void in the ranks of the Liberation Army. He was 47 years old when he died. Because of his fierceness in wars, he was and is known as the Lion of the East.

His remains are buried in the Santa Ifigenia Cemetery in the city of Santiago de Cuba.
