= Juan Delgado González =

Cuban independence activist (1868–1898)

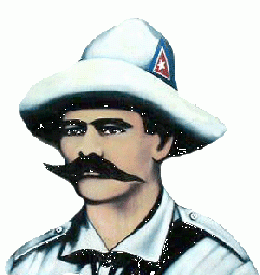
- Born: December 27, 1868; Bejucal, La Habana, Cuba, Spain
- Died: April 23, 1898 (aged 29); El Caño, La Habana, Cuba, Spain
- Military career
- Allegiance: Cuba
- Branch: Cuban Liberation Army
- Service years: 1896 – 1898
- Rank: Colonel
- Conflicts: Cuban War of Independence: Battle of San Pedro

Juan Evangelista Delgado González was a Cuban colonel who participated during the Cuban War of Independence. He was known for retrieving the bodies of Antonio Maceo Grajales and Panchito Gómez Toro during the Battle of San Pedro where both were killed in the battle.

== Personal life ==
He was born on a farm known as El Bosque in the Beltrán neighborhood in Bejucal which was a municipality in the former La Habana Province on December 27, 1868.

Being the eldest of four brothers within a family of peasants, his brothers were Donato, Ramón and Simón. He had a romantic relationship with the young widow Dolores Pastrana, with whom he promised to marry when the Cuban War of Independence ended, something that never happened due to his death in the war.

== Military career ==
He joined the Cuban Liberation Army on January 13, 1896, joining the invading contingent in the Bejucal area. The next day, Major General Máximo Gómez made him captain to muster up a unit.

Among his first battle are that of the Mi Rosa sugar mill and the taking of Fort Vigoa, in the town of Wajay, on the outskirts of Havana. He was then given command of the Santiago de las Vegas Cavalry Regiment, later known as the Mayía Cavalry Regiment.

He also fought in the regions of San Antonio de los Baños, Santiago de las Vegas, El Rincón, Bejucal, La Salud, Quivicán, San Felipe, Managua, Calabazar, Arroyo Naranjo and El Calvario.

Other active areas he participated were Gavilán (June 2, 1896), Morales (May 29, 1896), Santa Bárbara (July 2, 1896), La Eulalia (July 27, 1896), El Volcán (May 5, 1896), Cervantes (August 24, 1896), Lomas de Pacheco (August 25, 1896), Galera (August 28, 1896) and El Volcán (September 3, 1896).

He then led an offensive against the Calabazar guerrilla on September 22, 1896, and annihilated the Quivicán guerrilla in Toledo Viejo on September 27, 1896. Afterwards, he fought in Lealtad on October 9, 1896, La Gloria on October 10 and 15, 1896, Lago on October 12, 1896, Coca on October 13, 1896, and Esperanza on October 16, 1896. He annihilated the guerrillas of El Rincón, in La Luisa on October 25, 1896.

He continued fighting in places like El Volcán on December 16, 1896, where he was wounded in the knee fighting the guerrillas of Managua and El Plátano in December 1896. Later, on May 8, 1897, he attacked Bejucal and also fought at La Pita on March 27, 1897, Barreto on March 28, 1897, Loma del Hambre on April 4, 1897, and Maurín on June 27, 1897.

One of his most daring actions was the assault on the city of Marianao which was very close to Havana on July 28, 1897. He then participated in the battles of San Pedro and Lomas de Ramón on September 22, 1897.

== Death ==
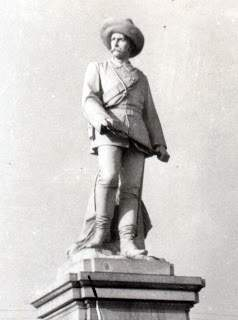
A statue of Juan Delgado in Santiago de las Vegas.

On April 10, 1898, the Spanish government decreed an armistice, which was not recognized by the Cuban Liberation Army. Confident about the apparent tranquility in his area of operations, Colonel Delgado met his parents and other relatives on the 22nd of that month, at his camp in Govea, Bejucal.

After the reunion, he went to the farm of his fiancée Dolores Pastrana, accompanied only by his escort and his brothers, Commander Donato Delgado and Captain Ramón Delgado, no more than 20 men in total. Camping on April 23 on that farm, near El Cano, the small group was surprised by Spanish forces far superior in number.

The small group beat a retreat, scattering. In the confusion of combat, the three Delgado brothers fell: Juan, Donato and Ramón. Having lost their horses, they were wounded by bullets and finished off with machetes by enemy troops, who later exhibited the mutilated corpses in nearby towns.

== Promotions and legacy ==
He was promoted to captain on January 14, 1896, to commander on April 28, 1896, to lieutenant colonel on July 1, 1896, and to colonel on October 15, 1897 . When he died he had been proposed by Major General Mayía Rodríguez to be promoted to Brigadier General.

Currently, a street in Havana bears his name and there is also a marble statue erected in his memory in Santiago de las Vegas. He is considered the distinguished patriot of Mayabeque Province.
