= List of hospitals in Cuba =

This is a list of hospitals in Cuba. There are no private hospitals or clinics in Cuba, as all health services are government-run. There were 150 hospitals in Cuba, as of 2019.

== Havana ==
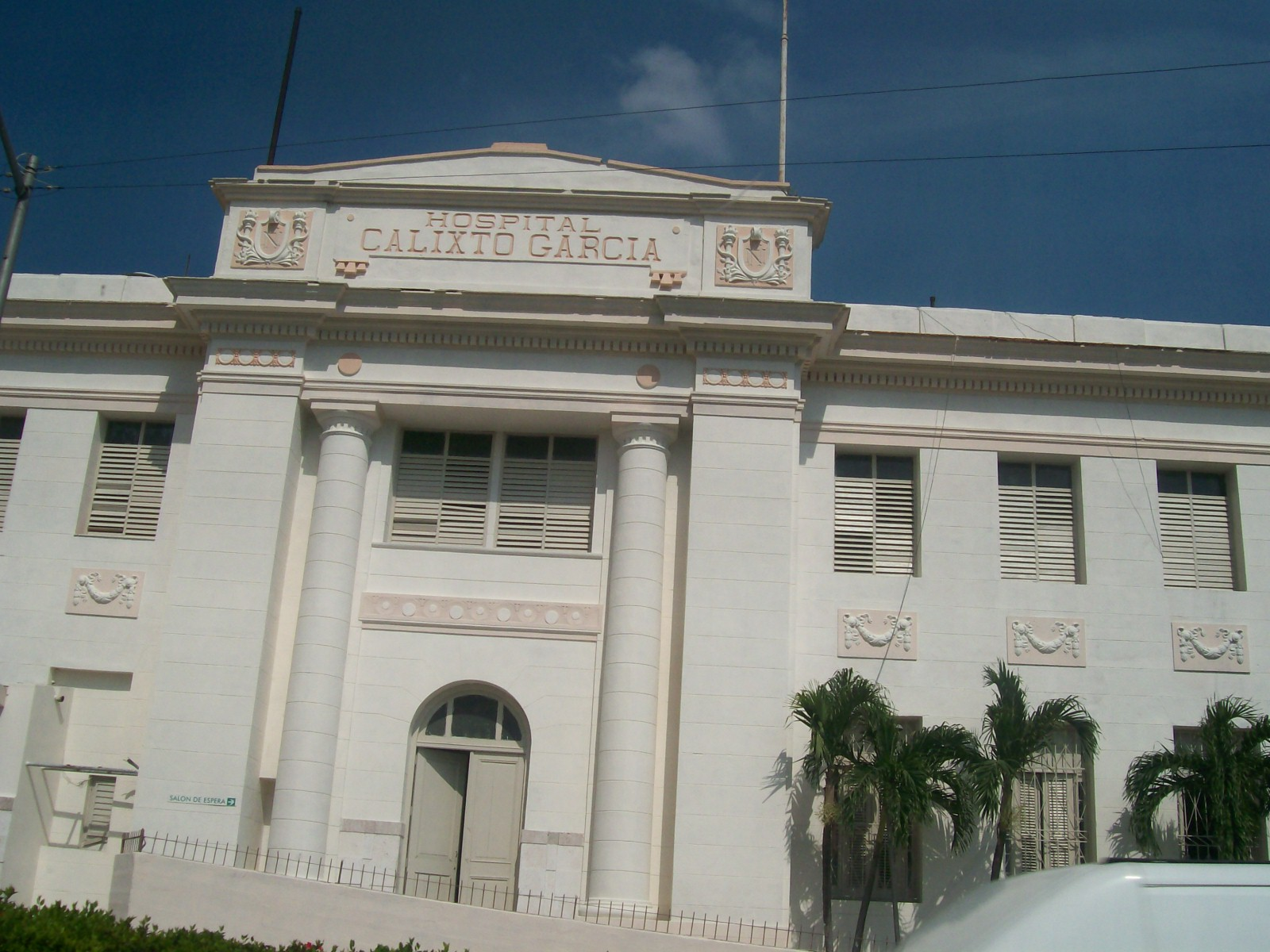
General Calixto Garcia University Hospital

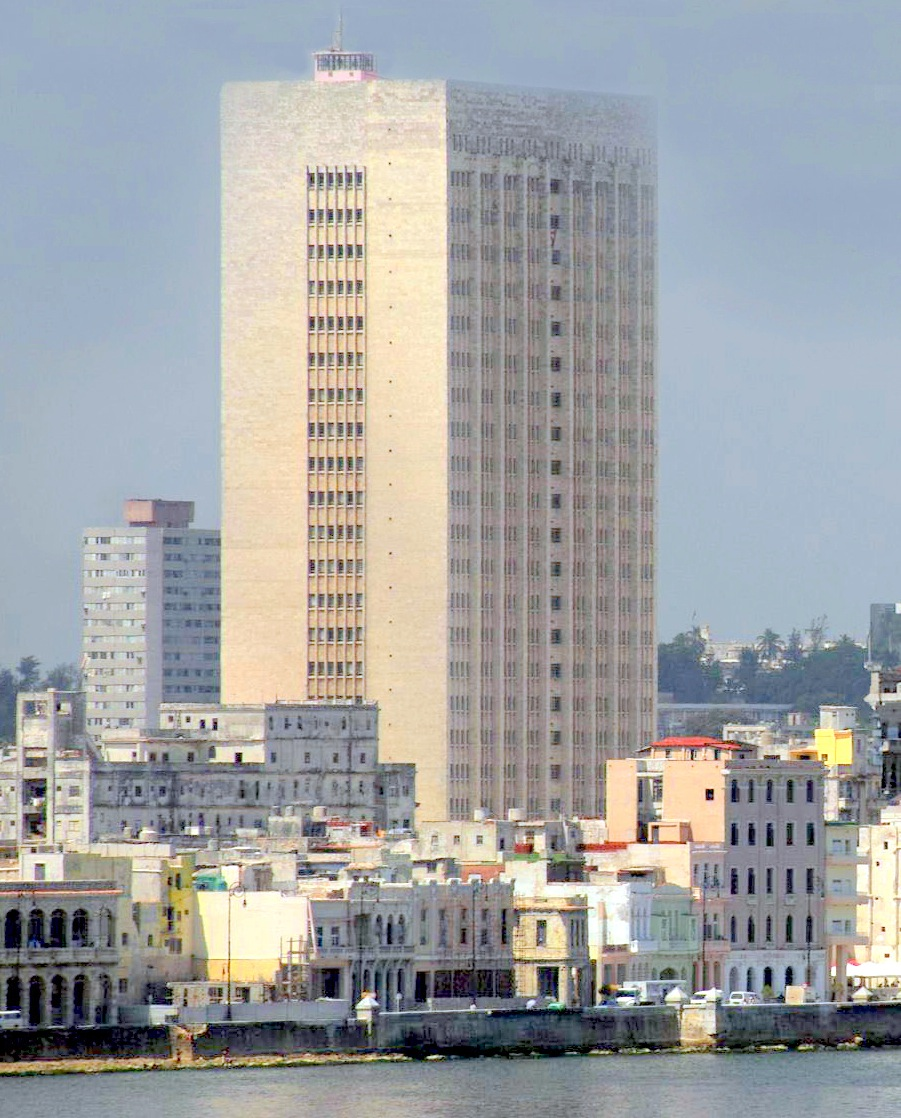
Hermanos Ameijeiras Hospital

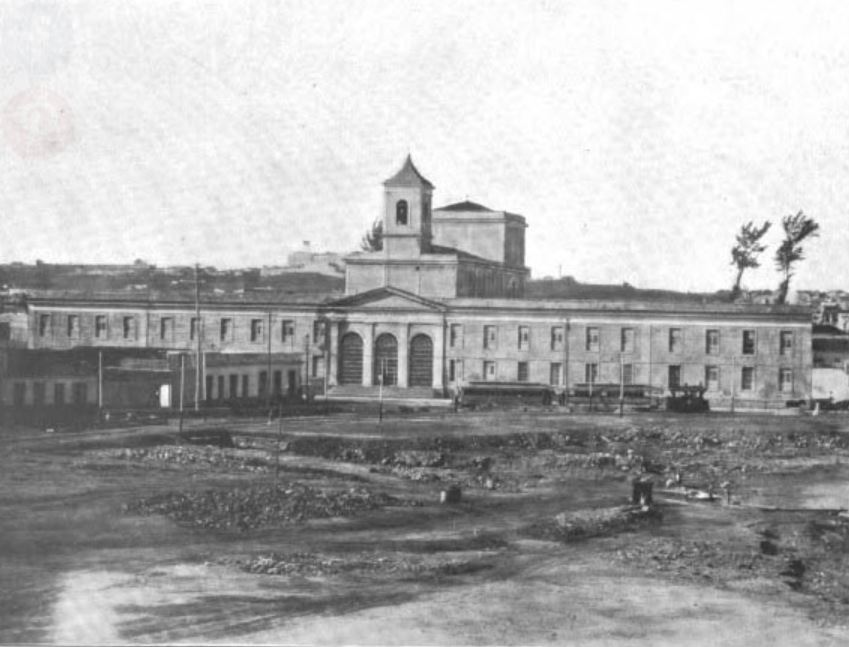
Royal Hospital of San Lázaro (circa 1915)

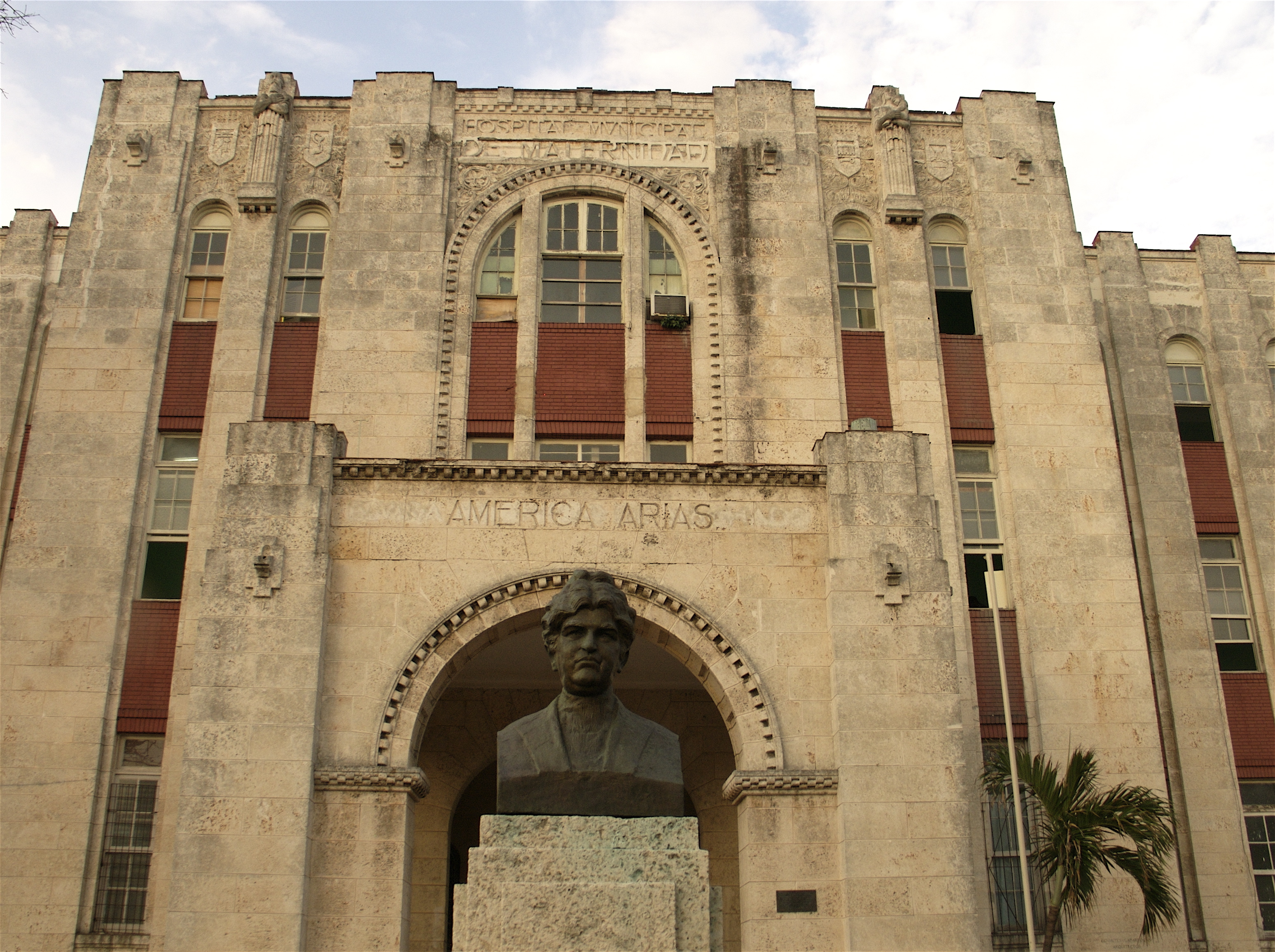
Mariano Workers' Maternity Hospital

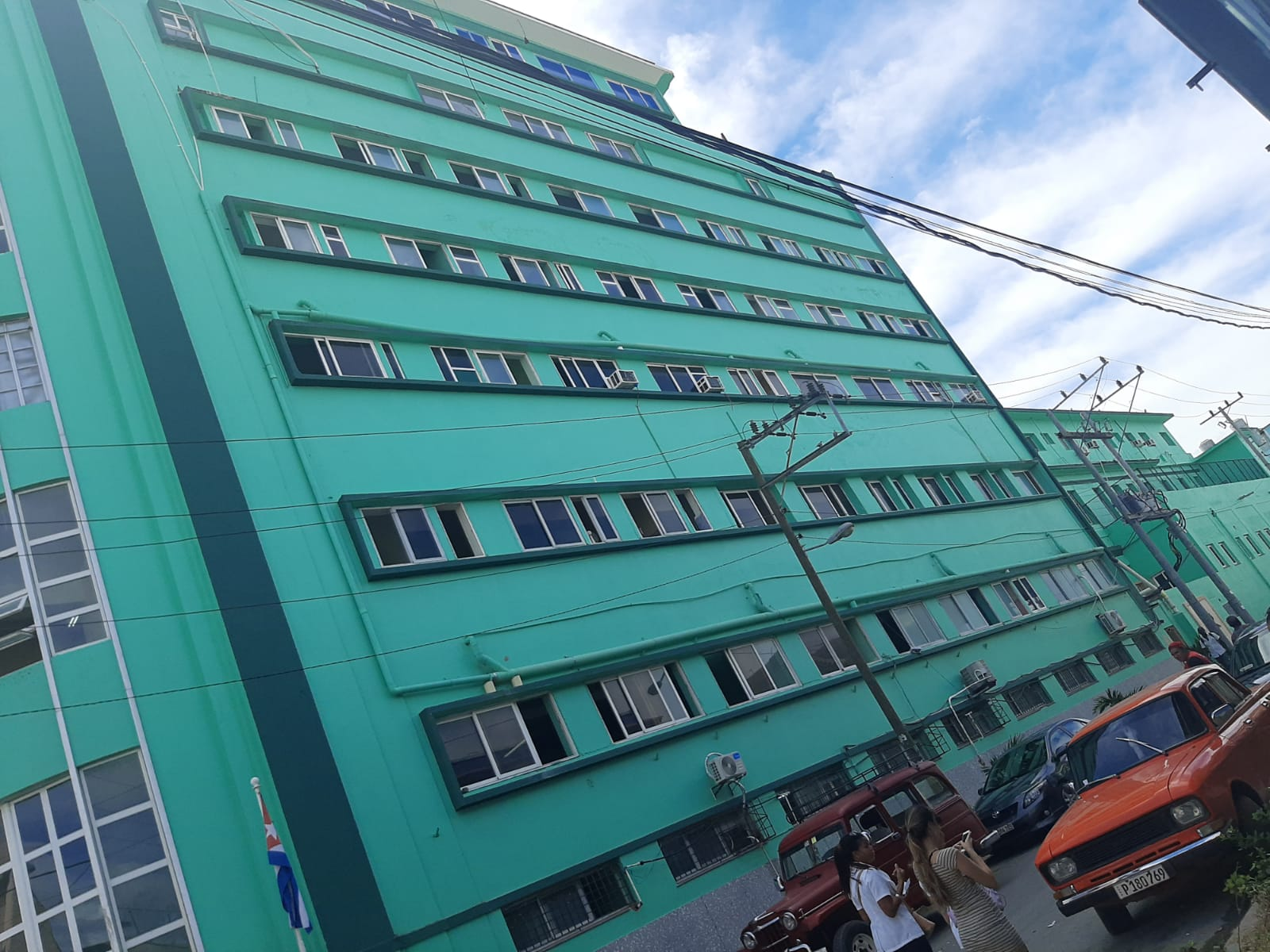
Daughters of Galicia Hospital

Active and notable hospitals in Havana, capital of Cuba, are listed below. The hospital name in English and Spanish and date first opened are included.

Hospitals in Havana, Cuba
Hospital Name (English/Spanish)	Location within Havana	Beds	Opened, References
27 November Psychiatric Hospital; Hospital Psiquiátrico Quinta Canaria, formerly Nuestra Señora de la Candelaria	23°03′40″N 82°21′57″W		1907<
Borrás-Marfan Pediatric Hospital; Hospital Pediátrico Borrás-Marfan	23°07′58″N 82°23′52″W		
Comandante Manuel Fajardo Surgical Clinical Hospital (Note: The Comandante Manuel Fajardo Surgical Clinical Hospital was built at the site of the Hospital Nuestra Señora de las Mercedes, founded in 1886.); Hospital Clínico Quirúrgico Comandante Manuel Fajardo	23°07′47″N 82°23′15″W		
Central Military Hospital Carlos J. Finlay; Hospital Militar Carlos J. Finlay	Avenida 31; 23°04′55″N 82°25′53″W	530	1943
Cira Garcia Central Clinic (Note: There is also a Cira Garcia International Clinic that serves only foreign patients.); Clínica Central Cira Garcia Hospital	23°07′07″N 82°24′49″W		1948
Daughters of Galicia Hospital; Hospital Materno Infantil Diez de Octubre, Hospital Hijas de Galicia	23°06′17″N 82°21′28″E		1924
Frank Pais Orthopedic Hospital; Hospital Ortopédico Frank País	23°03′55″N 82°26′53″W		
General Calixto Garcia University Hospital; Hospital Clínico Quirúrgico Docente "General Calixto García"	23°07′13″N 82°25′09″W		1896
Havana Psychiatric Hospital (Note: The Havana Psychiatric Hospital was formerly the General House for the Insane of Cuba. It has also gone by the name of Mazorra.); Hospital Psiquiátrico de La Habana Comandante Doctor Eduardo Bernabé Ordaz Ducunge	Wajay, Boyeros; 23°00′46″N 82°23′52″W	2,500	1847
Hermanos Ameijeiras Hospital; Hospital Clínico Quirúrgico "Hermanos Ameijeiras"	Barrio de San Lázaro; 23°08′22″N 82°22′16″W		1982
Maternity Hospital Ramon Gonzalez Coro; Hospital Ginecobstétrico Ramón González Coro	23°07′51″N 82°23′52″W		
Institute of Neurology and Neurosurgery; Instituto de Neurologia y Neurocirugia	23°07′55″N 82°23′18″W		
Mariano Workers' Maternity Hospital; Hospital Maternidad Obrera de Marianao	Avenida 31; 23°05′20″N 82°25′27″W		1941
Medical University of Havana Hospital; Instituto Superior de Ciencias Medicas de Havana	23°04′40″N 82°26′39″W		1976
Pediatric Hospital of Central Havana; Hospital Pediátrico Docente Centro Habana	23°07′34″N 82°22′39″W	206	1970
Surgical Clinical Hospital Salvador Allende (Note: The Surgical Clinical Hospital Salvador Allende is on the site of the Quinta Covadonga, which was founded in 1896.); Hospital Clínico Quirúrgico Salvador Allende (La Covadonga)	Hill Causeway; 23°06′50″N 82°22′38″W		
San Miguel del Padrón Teaching Pediatric Hospital; Pediatric Hospital of San Miguel del Padrón	23°06′23″N 82°20′08″W		
Surgical Medical Research Center Hospital; CIMEQ, Centro de Investigaciones Médico Quirúrgicas	23°04′49″N 82°28′01″W		1982
Tarará Pediatric Hospital	23°10′22″N 82°12′09″E	350	1990
William Soler National Pediatric Teaching Hospital	Boyeros; 23°03′45″N 82°23′31″W		1986

== Other cities ==
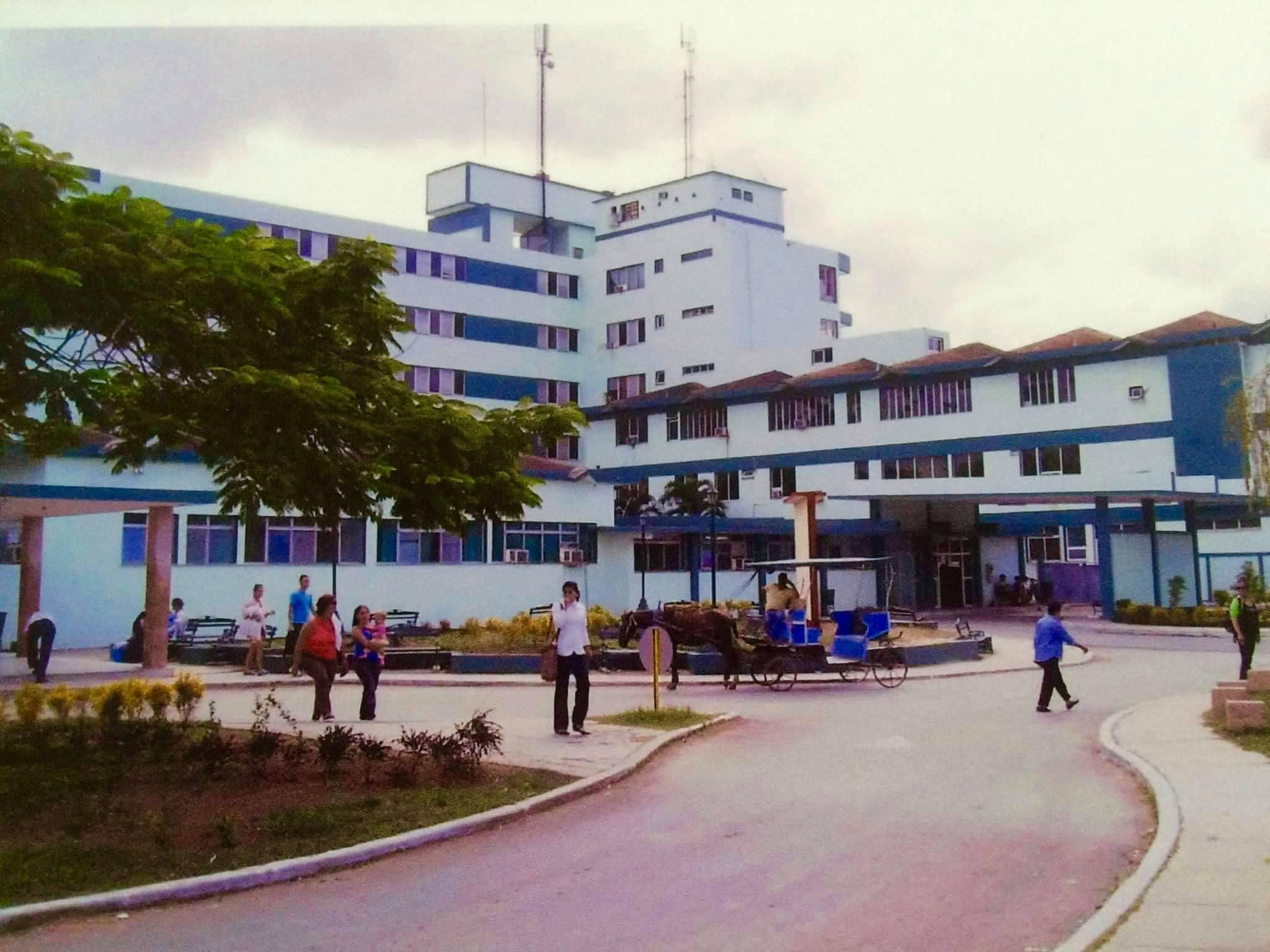
Hospital Docente Regional Mario Muñoz in Colón

Active and notable hospitals in other cities include:

Hospitals in Cuba outside of Havana
Hospital Name (English/Spanish)	Location	Beds	Opened, References
Army Military Hospital Comandante Manuel Fajardo Rivero	Santa Clara; 22°24′42″N 79°58′27″W	180	1827
Army Military Hospital Dr. Octavio de la Concepción y la Pedraja	Camagüey; 21°22′38″N 77°54′19″W	125	1959
Heroes del Baire Hospital; Hospital Héroes del Baire	Nueva Gerona; 21°53′35″N 82°48′24″W		1925
Hospital Alberto Fernández Montes de Oca; Alberto Fernández Montes de Oca Hospital	San Luis, Santiago de Cuba; 20°12′04″N 75°51′11″W	96	
Hospital Clinic Quirúrgico Dr. Gustavo Aldereguía Lima; Hospital Clínico Quirúrgico Dr. Gustavo Aldereguía Lima	Cienfuegos; 22°08′17″N 80°26′27″W	94	1961
Hospital Clínico Quirúrgico; Lucía Iñiguez Landín	Holguin; 20°52′11″N 76°14′15″W	336	1998, November 28
Hospital Camilo Cienfuegos	Chambas; 21°56′13″N 79°26′22″W		1965
Hospital Clinic Quirúrgico Manuel Ascunce Domenech; Hospital Clínico Quirúrgico Manuel Ascunce Domenech	Camagüey; 21°22′55″N 77°55′51″W		
Pediatric Hospital Eliseo Noel Caamaño	Matanzas; 23°03′05″N 81°35′03″W		1968
Hospital Clínico Quirúrgico Faustino Perez	Matanzas; 23°02′53″N 81°36′01″W		
Hospital General Juan Bruno Zayas	Santiago; 20°02′05″N 75°47′56″W		
International Clinic Baracoa; Clínica Internacional Baracoa	Baracoa; 20°20′42″N 74°29′40″W		
International Clinic of Santiago; Clínica Internacional de Santiago de Cuba	Santiago de Cuba; 20°01′29″N 75°48′30″W		
International Clinic of Cienfuegos; Clínica Internacional de Cienfuegos	Cienfuegos; 20°01′25″N 75°47′58″W		
International Clinic Santa Lucia; Clínica Internacional Santa Lucia	Camagüey		
International Clinic Varadero; Clínica Internacional Varadero	Varadero		
Matanzas Provincial Hospital Jose Ramón Lopez Tabranes	Matanzas; 23°03′16″N 81°34′22″W		
Mario Muñoz Monroy General Teaching Hospital	Colón; 22°43′37″N 80°54′02″W		1962
US Naval Hospital	Guantanamo Bay Naval Base; 19°56′52″N 75°07′41″W		1903
Santa Isabel Hospital of Cárdenas	Cárdenas		1860

== Defunct hospitals ==
- Hospital de San Lázaro, Havana (Royal Hospital of San Lázaro), Barrio de San Lázaro, 1781-1916
- St. Ambrose Hospital, 1568-1899
- Hospital of San Felipe and Santiago (San Juan de Dios)
- Belemitas Hospital
- Hospice of San Isidro

== See also ==
- Healthcare in Cuba
- List of medical schools in the Caribbean#Cuba
