= Helio Orovio =

Cuban music historian (1938–2008)

Helio Orovio Diaz (4 February 1938 – 6 October 2008 in Havana) was a Cuban scholar and historian of Cuban music. He was born in Santiago de Las Vegas. He was a researcher with the Institute of Folklore and Ethnology at the Cuban Academy of Sciences. He authored several books on Cuban music, including El bolero latina, Musica por el caribe, and the reference work Cuban Music from A to Z. He was also a TV host, fronting the show Arte y folklore.

As a practicing musician, Orovio played with many bands, including Conjunto Jovenes del Cayo. He died in Havana in 2008.
