= Panchito Gómez Toro =

Cuban independence activist (1878–1896)

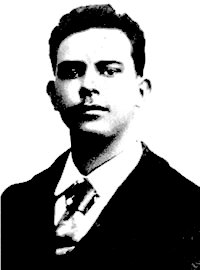
- Born: March 11, 1876; Jatibonico, Santa Clara, Cuba, Spain
- Died: December 7, 1896 (aged 20); San Pedro, La Habana Province, Cuba
- Relatives: Máximo Gómez (father); Bernarda Toro (mother)
- Military career
- Allegiance: Cuba
- Branch: Cuban Liberation Army
- Service years: 1896 – 1898
- Rank: Lieutenant
- Conflicts: Cuban War of Independence: Battle of San Pedro †

Francisco "Panchito" Gómez Toro was a Cuban lieutenant and war hero in the Cuban War of Independence. He was known for being the son of Máximo Gómez and for his death at the Battle of San Pedro at the young age of 20.

== Early years ==
On the afternoon of March 11, 1876, the La Reforma farm in Jatibonico saw the birth of Panchito, the fourth son of Máximo Gómez Báez and Bernarda Toro or Manana. His father couldn't be close with his son in the first months of his life due to his participation in the Ten Years War, which Cuba had already become his homeland. He couldn't even be there when Manana and his children had to leave for Jamaica and it was not until March 1878 that the whole family managed to reunite. Still an infant, Panchito, by assuming simple household chores, showed his sense of responsibility, which was distributed daily in the midst of the family's economic hardship. Together with his admiration for his father, whom he sometimes imitated in his childhood games, he reciprocally highlighted his sensitivity and love for his mother and siblings.

== Exile ==
In 1878 a difficult period began for the Gómez family, as with the end of the Ten Years War, they fled to Jamaica, Honduras and finally, to the United States. In 1888, they arrived at Santo Domingo which was where his father was originally from. They settled at La Reforma, a farm with the same name as Jatibonico.

Several members of their family was riddled with disease as some of the boys died, the crops were ruined, they suffered financial hardships, but they never gave up. In 1892, in Montecristi, Panchito worked at the Jiménez house, and José Julian Martí Pérez went there to look for him to take him to La Reforma where his father was. This first meeting of the young man with José Martí would mark the beginning of a friendship that would continue until Martí's death. Marti said of Panchito:

He stands out for his discretion and tenderness, I don't think I've ever had him by my side, a creature with fewer imperfections, his heart so attached to mine that I feel he was born of me.

On several occasions, Panchito collaborated with Martí, Antonio Maceo Grajales, his father and other revolutionaries in conspiracies in service of Cuban independence. Máximo Gómez entrusted his young sons, Panchito and his brother Maxito, with the guardianship of family affairs when he traveled.

In September 1896, he embarked on the steamer Tres Amigos with an expedition headed by General Juan Ruis Rivera, destined to land in the West. There she hopes to put herself under Maceo's orders.

== Cuban War of Independence ==
General Antonio Maceo welcomed Panchito like a son and always kept him close to him as he knew that by incorporating him into his troops, he would make a great commitment to Gómez. Towards the autumn of 1896, the contradictions between the government of the Republic in Arms and the general in chief of the Mambí Army, Máximo Gómez had become more acute. The petulance of Rafael M. Portuondo Tamayo, interim Secretary of War, brought the conflict to a point of no return and Gómez summoned Maceo to meet in Las Villas. He had a determination: to resign.

With impassive indifference the government observed the sacrifice in the Battle of Las Taironas, without help or any other help than its own efforts; but Maceo gave General Valeriano Weyler no respite or room for the United States which was waiting for the revolutionary thrust to weaken. In the second semester, the Bronze Titan had managed to supply the campaign after the landings of Leyte Vidal, with 200 rifles and 300,000 cartridges, and Juan Rius Rivera, with 920 rifles, 450,000 cartridges and a pneumatic cannon. Among the expeditionaries was Panchito Gómez Toro, Gómez's son that Martí took with him on his trip to Costa Rica, the one who, at just 14 years old, impressed the Apostle during his stay in La Reforma with his deep Bolivarian vocation and Quixotic sense of Justice and was 20 years old around the beginning of the campaign.

On November 2, Maceo received the note from Gómez. Two letters from Eusebio Hernández Pérez and Colonel Juan Masó Parra allowed him to understand the seriousness of the situation. He couldn't believe it. Concerned, he immediately responded to the call of the Generalissimo despite the fact that his stay in Pinar del Río was vital.

To get to Las Villas, he repeatedly tried to cross the 32 km long Mariel-Majana trail. In one of his attempts, he collapsed from his horse before regaining consciousness a few moments later. He stated that “he had been dizzy, and blamed it on the humidity of the night since he had fallen asleep a few minutes after having sucked a cane." Some have speculated that the reason was a precognitive dream in which he had seen his wife covered by a veil and all his brothers killed in the war.

He got a boat to cross the mouth of the Mariel River with 20 soldiers on December 4. He left behind his escort and 150 men who accompanied him to the trail Sullen y taciturn. It never seemed like such a short night to him, nor did he imagine that Commander Francisco Cirujeda, chief of 7th battalion, was waiting for him on the other side of the San Quintín River, who operated between Punta Brava and the route for Vueltabajo, on the border with Mariel, stated: "They have just assured me that Maceo intends to pass only by the immediate trail to Mariel […]”. Gómez had then notified his superior on December 1.

== Battle of San Pedro ==
Around 9:00 am on December 7, 1896, Maceo arrived at the San Pedro de Punta Brava farm, in Bauta, where some five hundred Havanans were waiting for him but Maceo arrived sick and had a fever. From his hammock, he outlined a plan aimed at attacking Marianao and other Havanan suburbs. Around 2:55 pm they were surprised to the voices of "Fire, fire in San Pedro!" as a large shootout followed one another that caused total disorder in the camp. Enraged, Maceo tried to get up from the hammock and, unable to do so, asked his assistant to hold out his hand. Given the confusion observed, he asked for a bugle to order the slaughter call and raise combat morale but no one appeared. He took 10 minutes to get dressed and saddled his horse, just as he used to do on the eve of a fight.

The Spanish forces took cover behind stone fences that dominated the area with their rifle fire. Maceo decided to carry out an encircling movement on both flanks to dislodge them from the parapet and beat them in the nearby paddock. A wire fence was in the way and they began to cut it. The maneuver was discovered and a downpour of projectiles did not let them finish the job. As he leaned over his horse, a bullet hit the right side of Maceo's face and severed his carotid artery near his chin. A stream of blood gushed from his wound and stained his jacket; He remained upright for two or three seconds, released the bridles, the machete fell off and he collapsed.

They were approached by Division General Pedro Díaz Molina, the highest-ranking officer in San Pedro, Brigadier José Miró Argenter, Chief of Staff of the 6th Corps, Colonels Máximo Zertucha, a physician to the lieutenant general, Alberto Nodarse Bacallao, his aide-de-camp during the invasion, and Commander Juan Manuel Sánchez Amat, head of the General Headquarters escort, who, seeing him collapsed, held his lifeless body and asked him in dismay: “What's wrong with you, general?".

Maceo didn't answer as had lost his speech and was pale without blood on his face with the deadly condition of the wound that took his life in just a minute. Miró Argenter left the place propelled, without looking back, ignoring Zertucha's cries asking for help to carry the corpse. After a few seconds of uncertainty, the doctor made the same decision and left scared, demoralized. Three days later, he would take advantage of the Spanish pardon; then he would request to rejoin the contest. Pedro Díaz also left with the three having same argument that they were waiting for reinforcements that never arrived.

Alberto Nodarse, an engineer and architect, who had already received seven gunshot wounds, together with Juan Manuel Sánchez led the resistance that the escort from the General Headquarters planted in the open field to try to remove Maceo's corpse that weighed 209 pounds. His movements drew Spanish fire and the place became an inferno. After great effort, they put him on a horse that was shot in the enemy camp. Sánchez brought his own and they tried to lift Maceo's corpse but a closed discharge hit both knees of the brave commander and he was neutralized. Bathing in blood from the copious bleeding caused by two projectiles that fractured his humerus and ribs, Nodarse had to give up, almost fainting. All the Cuban resources were used up after more than two hours of combat with the position becoming untenable and the last Mambises withdrew seriously wounded.

During the battle, Panchito got wounded during the fighting and was ordered to stay at the camp. Upon learning of the tragedy however, Panchito, with one arm in a sling, went as he put it to "...die next to the general." He went out to the battlefield once again to search for Maceo's corpse, making himself an open target for the Spanish soldiers despite the warns of the other Cuban soldiers. Weakened from blood loss, Panchito tried to commit suicide in order to prevent his capture but while writing his suicide note, a Spanish soldier caught him and stabbed him with a machete. After the battle, Juan Delgado González as well as eighteen other men managed to retrieve both Panchito's and Maceo's corpses after rigorous fighting against the Spanish and gave both proper burials.

His father Máximo was devastated as added to the outrageous effect of the Government Council's attitude was the death of his own son and his old companion with his skin weathered by so much fighting. Suddenly, he began to cry stating{ “Another great misfortune, the most terrible that could befall me. How much truth he expressed when he had the idea to say: 'Evils never come alone'" he recorded on December 16 in his diary. And on the 28th, in the privacy of his hammock, he poured out his pain: “Sad, very sad, more than sad, the year 96 has been for me! It leaves me heartbroken and battered. […] today, on this day, in these moments, I feel in my soul the deepest sorrow and I almost feel overwhelmed by a sorrow that I make an effort to bear”.

Panchito hadn't even turn 21 and his blood flooded the fields of the country. Days later the news of his death would reach his father, plunging him into a deep depression that lead him to express:

My beloved Panchito died far away from me; my arms remained open, waiting for him, because that is how destiny arranged it (...) Rest in peace, happy hero, flower of a day that spread its perfumes among his own (... ) we will always be crying to you (...) in the home that your eternal absence has left desolate and sad, your mourning will be eternal.
