= University of Information Science =

University research center in Wajay, Havana, Cuba

- Universidad de las Ciencias Informáticas
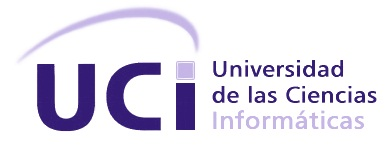
- Motto: Conectados al Futuro, Conectados a la Revolución (Connected to the Future, Connected to the Revolution)
- Type: Public
- Established: 2002; 24 years ago
- Rector: Walter Baluja García
- Students: 3,500 (approx.)
- Location: Havana, Cuba; 22°59′24.9″N 82°27′57.4″W
- Website: Official website

The University of Informatic Sciences (Spanish: Universidad de las Ciencias Informáticas; UCI, also known as the University of Information Sciences and University of Informatics Sciences) is a Cuban university research center based in the ward of Wajay, Boyeros municipal borough, Havana.

== History ==
Born as a project of the Cuban Revolution called the "Future Project" which has two objectives: to computerize the country and develop the software industry to contribute to economic development the same. It is the first Cuban university to be established under the purposes of the Battle of Ideas.

== Formation ==
The UCI has a particular curriculum among other universities in the country. Students follow the principle of linking work and study, which places an emphasis on production as part of the learning process. From the second or third year of study students can be linked to productive projects that contribute to the economy.

The university offers the following degrees

- Engineering in Information Sciences
- Bioinformatic Engineering
- Cybersecurity Engineering

Other activities complement the training curriculum to provide space for research and innovation and the development of skills in the use of technology. The UCI has advanced computer technology and is one of the major computer centers in Cuba.

== Nova ==
Nova is a Linux distribution being developed by students and professors at the Universidad de las Ciencias Informáticas, with the participation of members of other institutions, to support the ongoing migration to Free Software in Cuba as part of the computerization of the Cuban society.

== Gallery ==
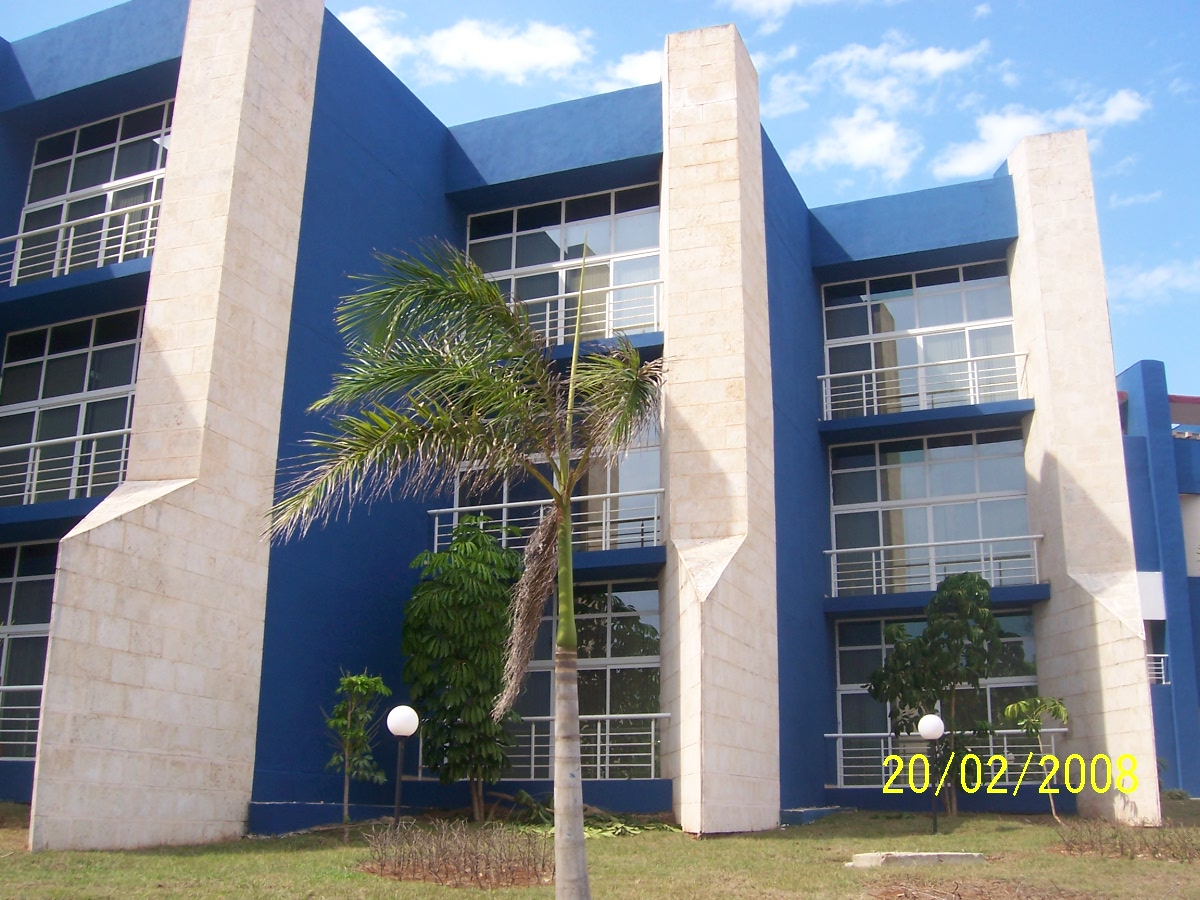

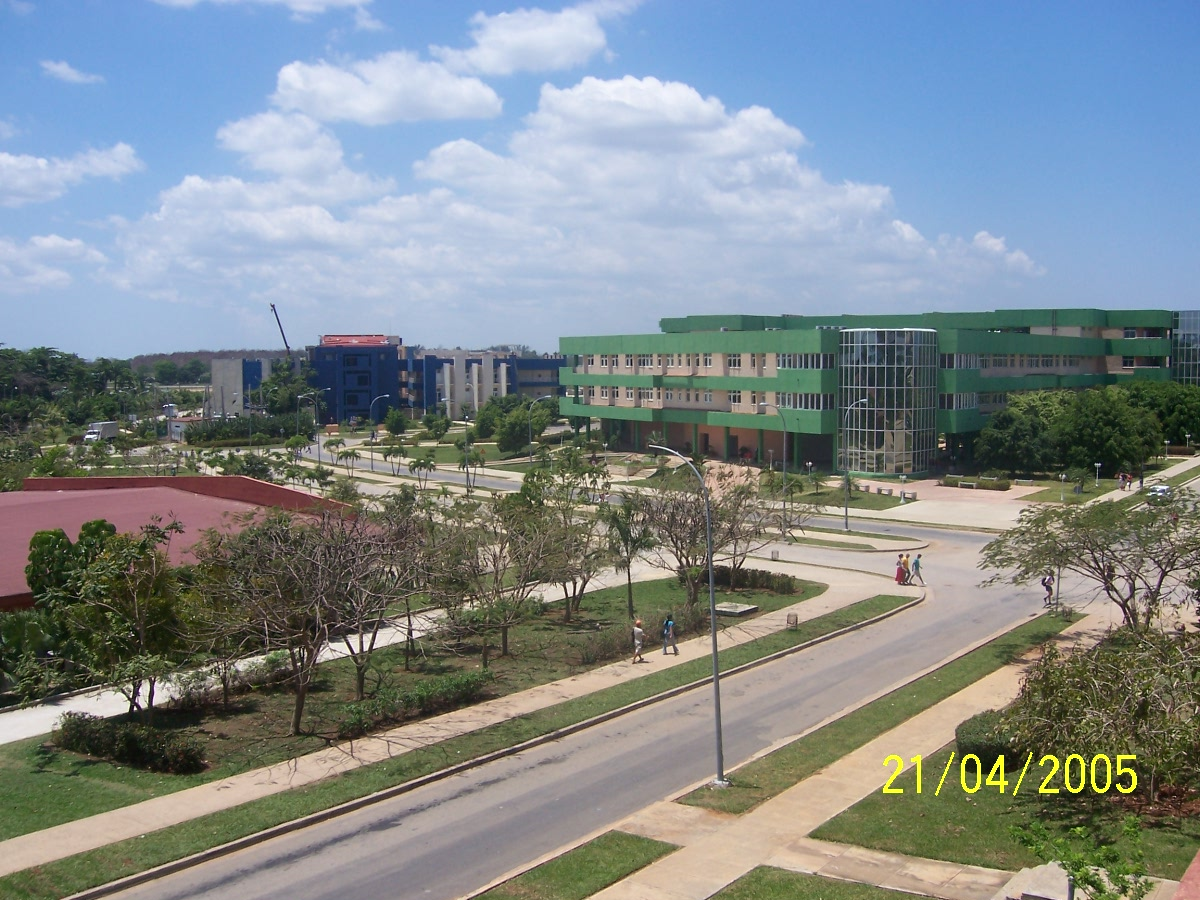

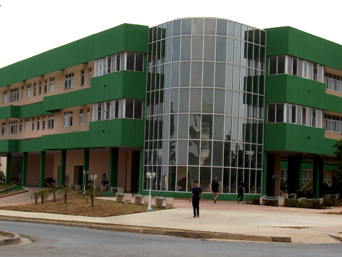
