= Alberto Rodríguez Acosta =

Cuban general (1869–1897)

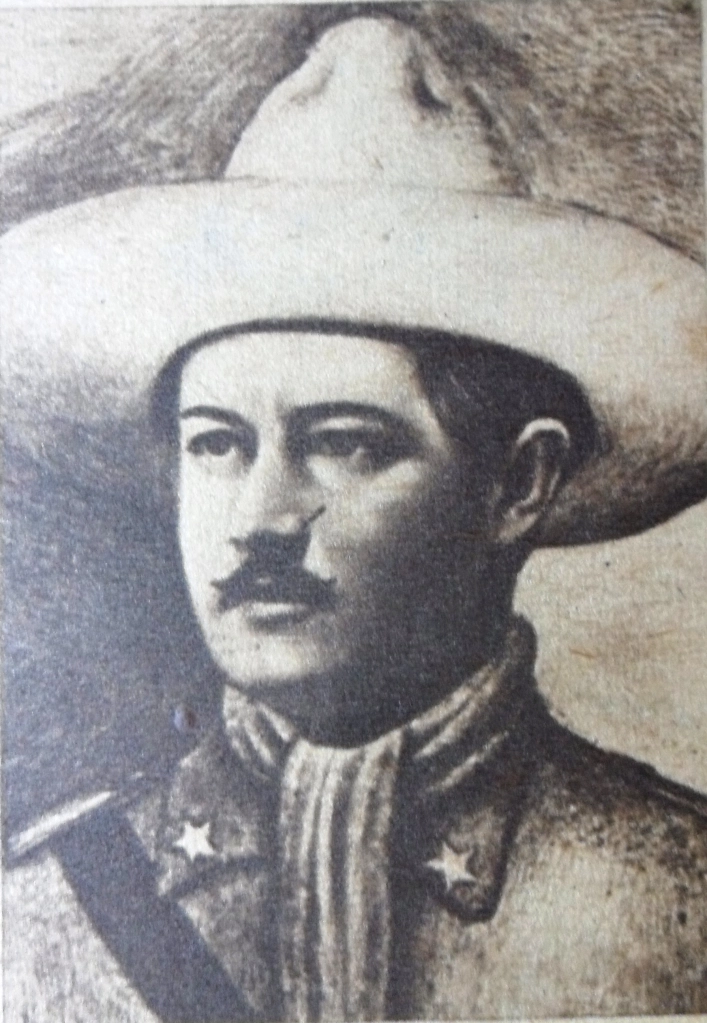
- Born: August 7, 1869; Unión de Reyes, Matanzas, Cuba, Spain
- Died: May 18, 1897 (aged 27); Batabanó, La Habana, Cuba, Spain
- Military career
- Allegiance: Cuba
- Branch: Cuban Liberation Army
- Service years: 1895–1897
- Rank: General de brigada
- Conflicts: Cuban War of Independence: Invasion from East to West in Cuba; Battle of San Pedro; Battle of Mortuorio †

Alberto Rodríguez Acosta (June 5, 1871 – February 10, 1963) was a Cuban Brigadier General of the Cuban War of Independence. He was known for commanding the Second Division of the V Corps and would primarily operate in actions within the Invasion from East to West in Cuba.

== Military career ==
Rodríguez Acosta was born in the town of Alacranes which was a municipality of Unión de Reyes on August 7, 1869. Enlisting at a young age, he would participate in the Cuban War of Independence, beginning on February 24, 1895. Between October 1895 and January 1896, he would participate in the Invasion from East to West in Cuba, gaining the trust of José Miró Argenter. He was promoted to Lieutenant Colonel four months later and given command of the 1st Infantry Regiment Battalion. After taking part in the Battle of Güira de Melena on May 8, 1896, he was promoted to Colonel and was head of the 3rd Brigade of the 2nd Division of the V Corps, being a substitute of Colonel Aurelio Collazo who was killed in the battle. On the same day, he would launch an ambush at La Cunda against a numerically superior Spanish force commanded by Captain Emilio Parrondo.

During the Battle of San Pedro, a counterattack commanded by Rodríguez Acosta and Juan Delgado González which forced the Spanish forces to retreat behind a stone column but would retreat after the sheer number of Spanish forces. After receiving the news of the death of Antonio Maceo Grajales by his doctor, Máximo Zertucha, Rodríguez Acosta wouldn't lose his morale unlike most commanders of the battle and would help with boosting morale of the remaining soldiers at the makeshift camps along with Delgado González. During the Battles of El Caimán beginning on February 27, 1897, Rodríguez Acosta commanded the Fourth Brigade of the Second Division of the V Corps against the Pizarro Battalion. During the battle, he would besiege the battalion from the left which left the numerically superior Spanish forces disoriented and withdrew disorderly and abandoned several horses, multiple supplies, weapons and ammunition and a surgery kit.

The forces of the now Brigadier General Rodríguez Acosta would be ambushed by Spanish forces during the Battle of Mortuorio. He would take the initiative and launch a cavalry charge against the numerically superior Spanish force. He would be shot in the groin and would later die from the wound, buried near the battlefield.
