= Pedro Díaz Molina =

Cuban general

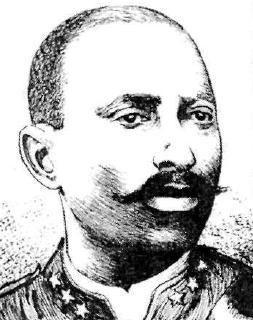
- Born: January 17, 1850; Yaguajay, Santa Clara Province, Cuba
- Died: May 15, 1924 (aged 74); Caimito, Pinar del Río Province, Cuba
- Military career
- Allegiance: Cuba
- Branch: Cuban Liberation Army
- Service years: 1868 – 1880; 1895 – 1906
- Rank: Major General
- Conflicts: Cuban War of Independence: Invasion from East to West in Cuba; Battle of Coliseo; Battle of Calimete; Battle of San Pedro

Pedro Antonio Díaz Molina was a Cuban general who was the only former slave that was a major general in the Cuban Liberation Army.

== Origins and the Ten Years' War ==
Pedro was born in the town of Yaguajay, in Las Villas, Cuba, on January 17, 1850. He was the son of Caesarea Regla who was a slave, he adopted the surnames of his owners, being a slave himself.

On October 10, 1868, the Ten Years' War broke out and in February 1869, the first pro-independence rebels rose up in the Las Villas Province. Having heard the news of the arrests, Pedro fled from his hacienda in April of that same year, to join the mambises.

In said war, Díaz fought under the orders of generals Salomé Hernández, Francisco Villamil, Carlos Roloff, Miguel Jerónimo Gutiérrez, Honorato del Castillo, and the brothers Federico and Adolfo Fernández Cavada.

At the end of the war in 1878, Díaz was under the command of then Colonel Francisco Carrillo Morales, in the Jurisdiction of Remedios. By then, Díaz was already Commander. The Zanjón Pact, which ended that war, recognized the freedom of the slaves who had fought in the Mambí Army, which benefited Commander Díaz Molina.

== Little War ==
In August 1879, the Little War broke out. Díaz rose in November 1879 and remained in arms until August 1880, after the war had failed. Diaz ended this war with the rank of Lieutenant Colonel.

After this, he settled in the Villa de San Juan de los Remedios and dedicated himself to agricultural work in various mills. He became involved in the different Cuban independence conspiracies of the time.

== Cuban War of Independence ==
On February 24, 1895, the Cuban War of Independence broke out and Lieutenant Colonel Pedro Díaz Molina took up arms on June 5 of that year and, shortly after, was appointed Chief of the "Remedies Brigade".

Díaz Molina joined Generals Máximo Gómez and Antonio Maceo during the Invasion from East to West in Cuba and took part in several of their combats, particularly in Calimete and Coliseo.

He also participated in Maceo's campaigns in Pinar del Río and was present at the Battle of San Pedro, where General Maceo lost his life, on December 7, 1896. Later, General Díaz assisted the expeditions of Colonel Francisco Leyte-Vidal and General Juan Rius Rivera in the province of Pinar del Río .

In 1898, the United States intervened in the war against Spain and militarily occupied the island until 1902. Pedro Diaz ended the war in 1898, with the rank of Major General, along with his troops in his camp near the city of Pinar de Rio.

== Later years ==
After the war and once the Republic was established, General Díaz was elected representative for Artemisa, between 1902 and 1906. He then married Hilaria Bocourt and had 6 children with her.

Major General Pedro Antonio Díaz Molina died of natural causes, on May 15, 1924, in Caimito at the age of 74.
