= Battle of San Pedro (1896) =

- Part of Cuban War of Independence
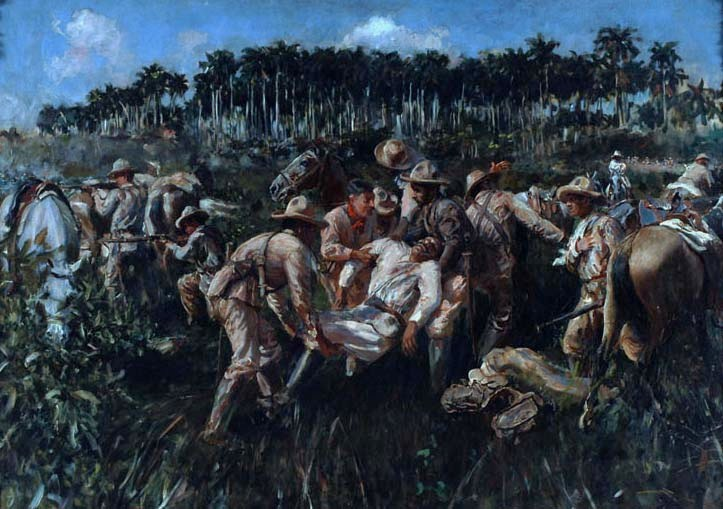
- Death of Antonio Maceo
Date	December 7, 1896
Location	La Habana Province, Cuba
Result	Spanish victory

Belligerents
Cuban rebels	Spain

Commanders and leaders
Major General Antonio Maceo † / José Miró (WIA); Pedro Díaz; Alberto Rodríguez; Ricardo Sartorio; Juan Delgado; Panchito Gómez †	Lieutenant Colonel Francisco Cirujeda; Doroteo Peral

Strength
400 Infantry	365 Infantry; 114 Loyalists

The Battle of San Pedro was a battle of the Cuban War of Independence that took place on December 7, 1896 within the vicinity of the farm of the same name. The battle occurred near the town of Punta Brava on the outskirts of Marianao, La Habana Province.

== Background ==
The third war for the independence of Cuba broke out in the spring of 1895. After several months organizing and strengthening, the Cuban independence forces determined the creation of an invading contingent that was to extend the war to the end of the island.

In October of that year, the Cuban Liberation Army left Mangos de Baraguá, in eastern Cuba, made up of several thousand poorly armed men and led by Major Generals Máximo Gómez and Antonio Maceo. In January 1896, the liberating troops reached the extreme end of the province of Pinar del Río, in the west of the country.

Having achieved his mission, General Gómez took a part of the troops that had participated in the invasion and marched in the opposite direction, leaving General Maceo with the rest of the men to carry out new military actions in Pinar del Río. During that year, both Cuban generals obtained important victories in their respective campaigns.

However, towards the end of 1896, a series of discrepancies and tensions occurred within the government of the Guáimaro Assembly, which led General Gómez to request Maceo's personal intervention in the dispute.

General Maceo, extremely concerned about this situation, hurriedly marched towards the East of the country, leaving Pinar del Río and entering La Habana Province, with the intention of continuing to cross the rest of the island to reach the eastern end, where there was the Cuban independence government.

Finding themselves in Havana territory, Maceo and his men reached the farm of San Pedro, very close to the town of Punta Brava, on the outskirts of Marianao, a small city near the country's capital, Havana in order to give a humiliating twist for Valeriano Weyler.

== The battle ==
Around noon, colonel Juan Delgado González reported the first signs of Spanish soldiers beginning to arrive and Maceo sent a search party under the command of José Miró Argenter which was pursued by Cirujeda with the Peral Guerrilla (90 Cubans), 365 Spanish soldiers and 24 Cubans from the Punta Brava Guerrilla while Maceo made the critical error of deciding to take a nap at his hammock while the search party couldn't locate the Spanish forces.

At 3 P.M., the Spanish soldiers ambushed the Cuban camp as the infantry swept through the sentries and reached to the center of the camp. A fierce counterattack of around 40 Mambises was led by Alberto Rodríguez Acosta and Juan Delgado González. The Spanish retreated to the stone fences as the remaining Mambises regrouped for a final stand.

After being woken up, Maceo gathered up 45 veterans from the previous Cuban Independence Campaigns and assessed the situation as the Mambises took to the offensive. During the charge, a chain-link fence got in the way and Maceo himself offered to cut it down but as he was doing so, gunfire from the stone walls shot Maceo in the face and the neck. He remained on his horse for a few seconds before losing consciousness and eventually dying. The death of Maceo destroyed any remaining morale for the remaining Mambises as they abandoned their positions and retreated, giving the Spanish the victory.

== Aftermath ==
With the death of Antonio Maceo, the Cubans lost one of their best generals, which meant a significant weakening for the Mambíses and a certain demoralization among the troops.

Personally, General Máximo Gómez lost his most beloved son, Panchito Gómez Toro and his best friend in the same battle, which was expressed in a certain pessimism of Gómez on the following day with the following:

Pedro, are you sure that the remains of Maceo and my son Panchito are down there?

However, despite these losses, the war continued until 1898 and ended with Cuban victory, with the help of the United States.
