= Havana Psychiatric Hospital =

Havana Psychiatric Hospital (Mazorra)

Geography
- Location: Avenida Rancho Boyeros, Havana, Cuba
- Coordinates: 23°00′46.3″N 82°24′07.3″W

Organisation
- Type: Psychiatric

Services
- Beds: 2,500

History
- Opened: 1847

Links
- Website: www.psiquiatricohph.sld.cu
- Lists: Hospitals in Cuba

The Hospital Psiquiátrico de La Habana Comandante Doctor Eduardo Bernabé Ordaz Ducunge, better known as Mazorra (the name of the estate upon which it was built), is a Cuban psychiatric hospital located in north of Wajay, Boyeros, in the city of Havana.

== History ==
In 1857 it was founded with the name Casa General de Dementes de la Isla de Cuba.

In 2010 a number of patients died - according to the Catholic Church due to abandonment, bad state of the hospital, and theft of food, medicine and coats to sell on the black market. The estimated number of dead varies from 26 according to the Cuban state to 50 according to anti-government activists. As a result the Church requested urgent reform and opening to the private sector in the emblematic (state-run) health care sector. due to corruption, lack of resources, and bad service.
