= Calabazar =

- Ward of Havana
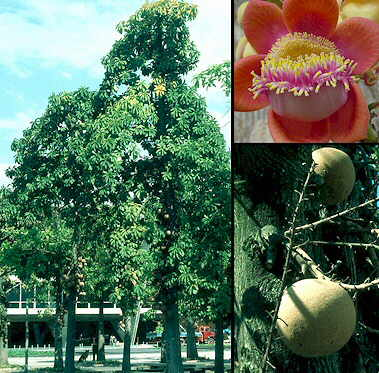
- An exemplar of Couroupita guianensis in the National Botanical Garden of Cuba

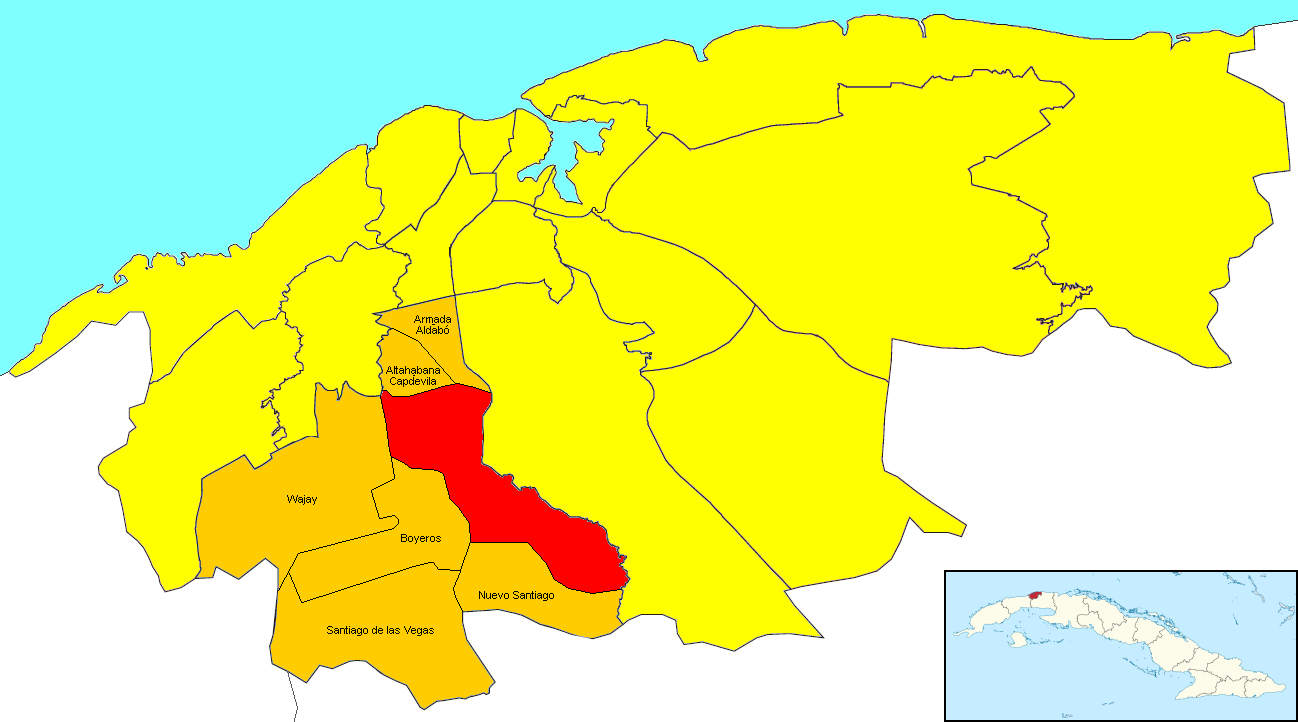
- Location of Calabazar (red) within Boyeros (orange) and Havana

- Location of Calabazar in Cuba
- Coordinates: 23°01′02.2″N 82°22′22.5″W
- Country: Cuba
- Province: Ciudad de La Habana
- Municipal borough: Boyeros
- Established: 1776
- Elevation: 80 m (260 ft)

Population (2011)
  - Total: 20,069
- Time zone: UTC-5 (EST)
- Area code: +53-7

Calabazar is a ward (consejo popular, "people's council") of the city of Havana, the capital of Cuba, belonging to the municipal borough of Boyeros. In 2011, it had a population of 20,069.

== History ==
Its history dates back to the time of the aboriginal cultures that settled in this region about 2,500 years ago, when the island's inhabitants settled in this place attracted by the mighty Casiguaguas River, the vegetation, terrestrial and aquatic fauna. The latest research carried out has found Indo-Cuban residues, human skulls and stone artifacts in the open air in the caves of its two river currents in existing caves.

Its nickname is the title of several geographical sites in Cuba, however when Calabazar is named, in Havana a unique and distinctive place of the Boyeros municipality is identified. It rises on the left bank of the Almendares river exactly on the Camino Real del Sur, now Calzada de Bejucal (kilometer twelve). It is a small town, known for the quality of its waters, its pottery industry, and a site where there are immediate antecedents of artistic ceramics in Cuba.

In this historic site the third uprising of the vegueros takes place on February 20, 1723, the first historical event and the last action carried out in the region in front of the tobacco store imposed by the metropolis.

Its name comes from when the Batabanó road was opened, given by the existence of a thick gourd next to the river since that time, then it was applied to the corral here mercedado, the force of custom made it a definitive name for this part of the river and for the primitive sugar mill built in its vicinity. Years later it was called "Aldea del Calabazar" or simply "Calabazar", as it is known today.

The section between this town and La Chorrera de Managua, corresponds to one of the oldest sugar areas in Cuba. The territory remained as an eminently sugarcane zone, producing sugar. The primitive sugar mill "Our Lady of Guadalupe and San Francisco de Paula (El Calabazar) was located on this site in 1682. For this reason, the territory was indistinctly identified as Calabazar or" Vuelta del Ingenio ".

During the 16th and 17th centuries the population of the region was unstable as a result of the migrations typical of the stage. The contradictions between the nascent sugar production and the tobacco fields, together with other factors, forced the cultivators of the aromatic leaf to migrate to the realengas areas or to the virgin lands of Pinar del Rio.

In 1766, one of the few census tables of this registration was made, its lands were occupied by a sugar mill, seven agricultural estates, 60 pastures and work sites, a population of 707 inhabitants, a figure that includes 106 slaves and 40 freedmen. all engaged in agricultural work, charcoal making, and housework. 93 scattered dwellings are listed in the fields without integrating any hamlet.

The "Aldea del Calabazar", as it was identified in those times, acquired the character of a town around 1820, more clearly around 1825, which began to take off due to the fame of its waters and the number of inhabitants. With the growth experienced, its small hermitage was declared in 1827 auxiliary of the Parish of Santiago de las Vegas.

Pre-republican period

This town was visited during his childhood by the Apostle of the Independence of Cuba José Martí and some members of his family resided, in the pre-republican period Major General Máximo Gómez Báez, Chief of the Liberation Army establishes his dwelling in this town on August 1, 1900

At the beginning of the 20th century, (1902) the Republic began, in the jurisdictional aspect the continuous territory forming part of the Santiago de las Vegas municipality as an extensive rural neighborhood. As of 1910, its typical spa town appearance began to slowly change and some small industries, workshops, and shops were opened. In 1910, President José Miguel Gómez established his residence at Finca "América", named after his wife América Arias, a lady remembered by many for her gestures in favor of this town.

On January 6, 1913, the municipal aqueduct "Aqueduct José Alberro" was inaugurated, at the end of 1912, the electric lighting was officially inaugurated, a service established by the Sociedad Anónima "Planta Eléctrica de Batabanó S.A". In the 1920s, - after the period of the intense economic crisis of 1920-1922, the manufacturing sector began to be promoted with the appearance of some small industries

The central park in this town began at the end of 1936, but its official inauguration took place on July 9, 1937, it was called Parque Máximo Gómez, in remembrance of the famous liberating figure who resided in this town. The local Catholic Church also develops its gospel the Baptist Church. On June 1, 1957, the "Martín Morua Delgado Lodge" was founded. In the heat of industrial and urban development, several associations emerged.

After the triumph of the armed insurrection in 1959, the territory became a section of the region called Boyeros. This division remained until 1976 when the new jurisdictional division was approved. On November 29, 1988, the Calabazar Council, a link in local government, was created.

== Geography ==
It is located in the south center of the periphery of the city of Havana, it borders all the neighborhoods of Boyeros, except Santiago de Las Vegas. It is located in the so-called "Cuenca del Almendares", also known as "Cuenca de Vento" with two fluvial currents, El Rio Almendares and Arroyo Jibaro, today affected by a hydrological crisis. Located at 23 ° 0 '58 "north latitude and 82 ° 22' 24" west longitude.

== Weather ==
The climate is warm, pleasant with an average temperature of 29°C and a minimum of 19°C. Relative humidity is approximately 81%.

== Economy ==
The main productions are pottery, ceramics, textiles, cardboard packaging, etc. Currently it presents an unusual economic metamorphosis that characterizes it by the appearance of an economy dominated by small commercial production, technical-administrative activity, research, services and self-employment. In the jurisdiction there are several centers of scientific importance, recreation that provides employment to a significant number of workers.

== Health ==
It has a Polyclinic that was inaugurated on October 6, 1988, until the eighties 34 family doctor's offices were built, a Circle of grandparents and four pharmacies.

== Sport ==
A town with a baseball tradition since the 19th century. In 2007, a modest stadium dedicated to the national pastime was inaugurated, built with communal work and the solidarity of workers and students.

== Education ==
It has 8 primary schools, a primary boarding school, 2 nursery schools, 2 Kindergartens, 3 Urban Basic High Schools, an ESBEC, an Adult Education Center, the Camilo Cienfuegos Military School, a Higher Pedagogical Institute and the Center for National Training of the Subdirectorate of Collective Law Firms.

== House of Culture ==
There are two traditional celebrations: the feast of San Juan Bautista, the patron saint of the town and the celebrations for the founding of the town. It is the site of the Provincial Literary Contest of Poetry "I am love; I am verse" which is convened annually by the Municipal Directorate of Culture of Boyeros and the Community House of Culture. In recent years the prestigious Culinary Festival "A Pumpkin Plate" has been held.

== Main sights ==
The territory of Calabazar includes the Havana Zoo, the National Botanical Garden of Cuba (belonging to the University of Havana), the ExpoCuba and a little portion of the Parque Lenin ("Lenin Park"), part of Arroyo Naranjo but in front of ward's centre.

== Transport ==
Calabazar is crossed, to the north, by the A2 motorway, the Havana's ring road, and counts the homonym exit. It is served by 4 stations (Calabazar, Berenguer, Piscinas and ExpoCuba) of the Havana Suburban Railway, sharing 2 others (Arroyo Naranjo and Parque Lenin) with Arroyo Naranjo. Some km west of it is located the Havana International Airport "José Martí".

== See also ==
- Parque Lenin
- José Martí International Airport
