= Bejucal Municipal Museum =

Museum in Bejucal, Cuba

- Museo Municipal de Bejucal
- Established: 8 January 1981
- Location: Bejucal, Cuba
- Coordinates: 22.92856°N 82.38880°W

Bejucal Municipal Museum is a museum located in the 13th street in Bejucal, Cuba. It was established on 8 January 1981.

The museum holds collections on history, weaponry, ethnography, decorative arts and numismatics.

== See also ==
- List of museums in Cuba
