= Carlos J. Finlay Military Hospital =

Military hospital in Cuba

Central Military Hospital Carlos J. Finlay
- Cuban Revolutionary Armed Forces

Geography
- Location: Havana, Cuba
- Coordinates: 23°05′26″N 82°25′58″W

Organisation
- Type: Military hospital

Services
- Beds: 530

History
- Opened: 1943

Links
- Lists: Hospitals in Cuba

The Central Military Hospital Carlos J. Finlay is a Cuban military hospital in Havana, Cuba. It was founded in 1943 with the objective of providing medical attention to the then-Cuban Constitutional Army and the families of its service personnel. It is named for Cuban epidemiologist Carlos Finlay.

== History ==
Originally founded in Camp Columbia military base, the hospital was originally a rustic military hospital. Under the government of General Mario García Menocal, the order was given to build the hospital for the military and their families. At that time, they began to replace the wood walls, improvised flooring and pavilions with concrete. Some of the pavilions were isolated in an effort to contain infectious diseases.

When Fulgencio Batista took power, he improved the lifestyle and housing conditions of the military. One of the biggest achievements was the inauguration of the hospital in its present location, on September 4, 1943, located on Avenida 31, then named Avenida de Columbia.
