= Bejucal =

- Municipality
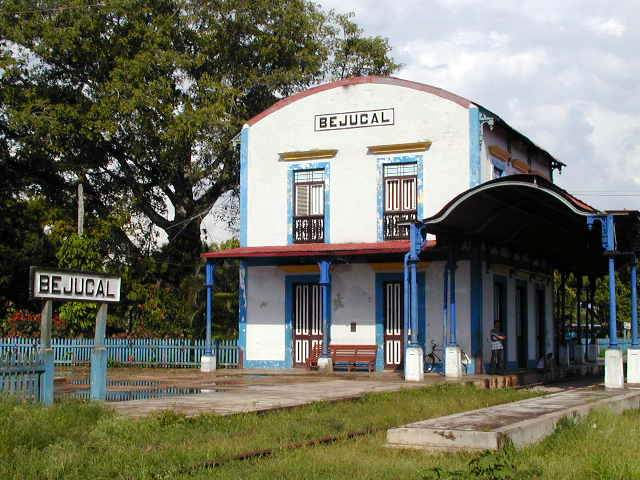
- Bejucal railway station

- Coat of arms

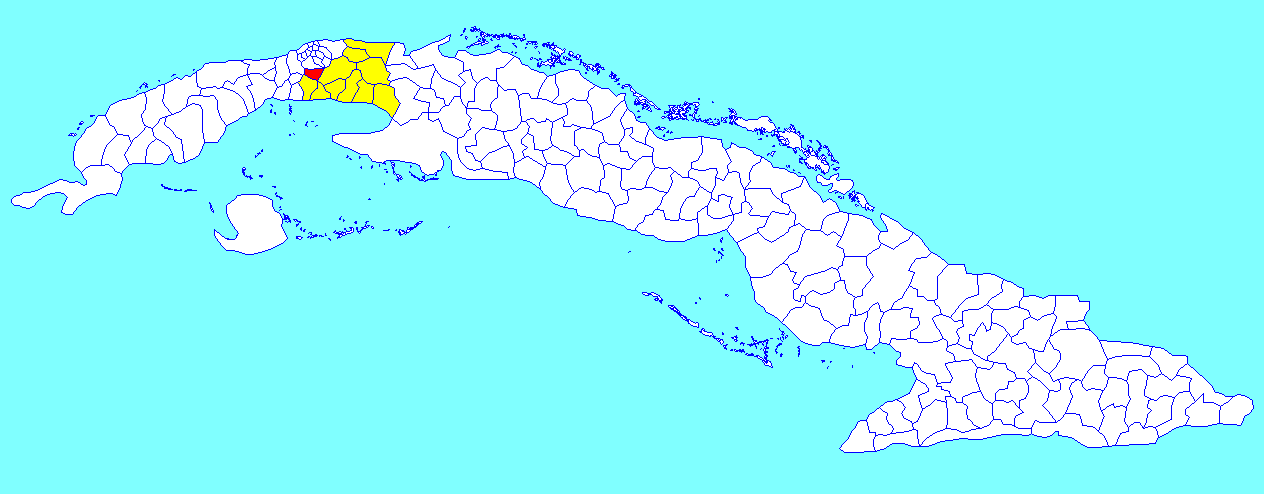
- Bejucal municipality (red) within Mayabeque Province (yellow) and Cuba
- Coordinates: 22°55′58″N 82°23′13″W
- Country: Cuba
- Province: Mayabeque
- Founded: 1874

Area
  - Total: 120 km^{2} (46 sq mi)
- Elevation: 105 m (344 ft)

Population (2022)
  - Total: 28,205
  - Density: 240/km^{2} (610/sq mi)
- Time zone: UTC-5 (EST)
- Area code: +53-7

Bejucal is a municipality and town in the Mayabeque Province of Cuba. It was founded in 1713. It is well known as the terminal station of the first railroad built in Cuba and Latin America in 1837. It also hosts one of the most popular and traditional carnival fest in Cuba: "Charangas de Bejucal". Bejucal has also been known as a telecommunications site, hosting broadcasts of several news and media networks. It hosted Soviet nuclear warheads during the Cuban Missile Crisis. Bejucal is also believed to host a signals intelligence listening station operated by the People's Liberation Army.

== Geography ==
The municipality borders to the north with Boyeros (a municipal borough of Havana); to the east with San José de las Lajas; to the south with Quivicán; and on the west with San Antonio de los Baños.

It is divided into the barrios of Bejucal, Beltrán, Cuatro Caminos, Rancho Recreo, Buenaventura, Caguazo and Río Hondo.

== Demographics ==
In 2022, the municipality of Bejucal had a population of 28,205. With a total area of 120 km^{2} (46 sq mi), it has a population density of 240/km^{2} (620/sq mi).

== Notable residents ==
Notable current and former residents of Bejucal include:

- Andy García, actor, was born and lived here until the age of five.
- Albio Sires, member of the United States House of Representatives from New Jersey's 8th congressional district.

== See also ==
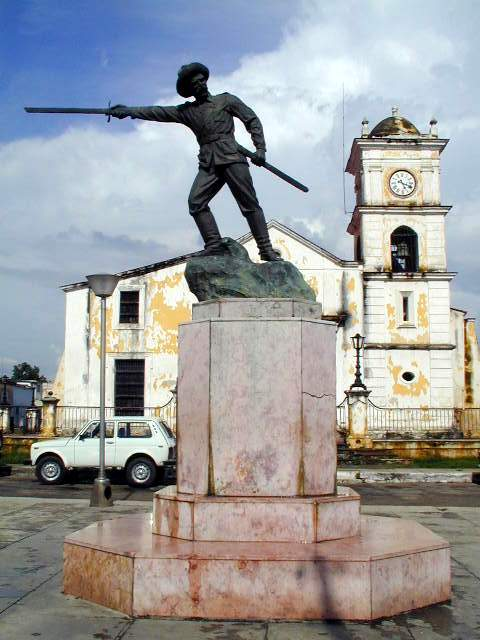
Bejucal Church

- Bejucal Municipal Museum
- Municipalities of Cuba
- List of cities in Cuba
