= Santiago de las Vegas =

- Town in Boyeros, Havana
- Seal

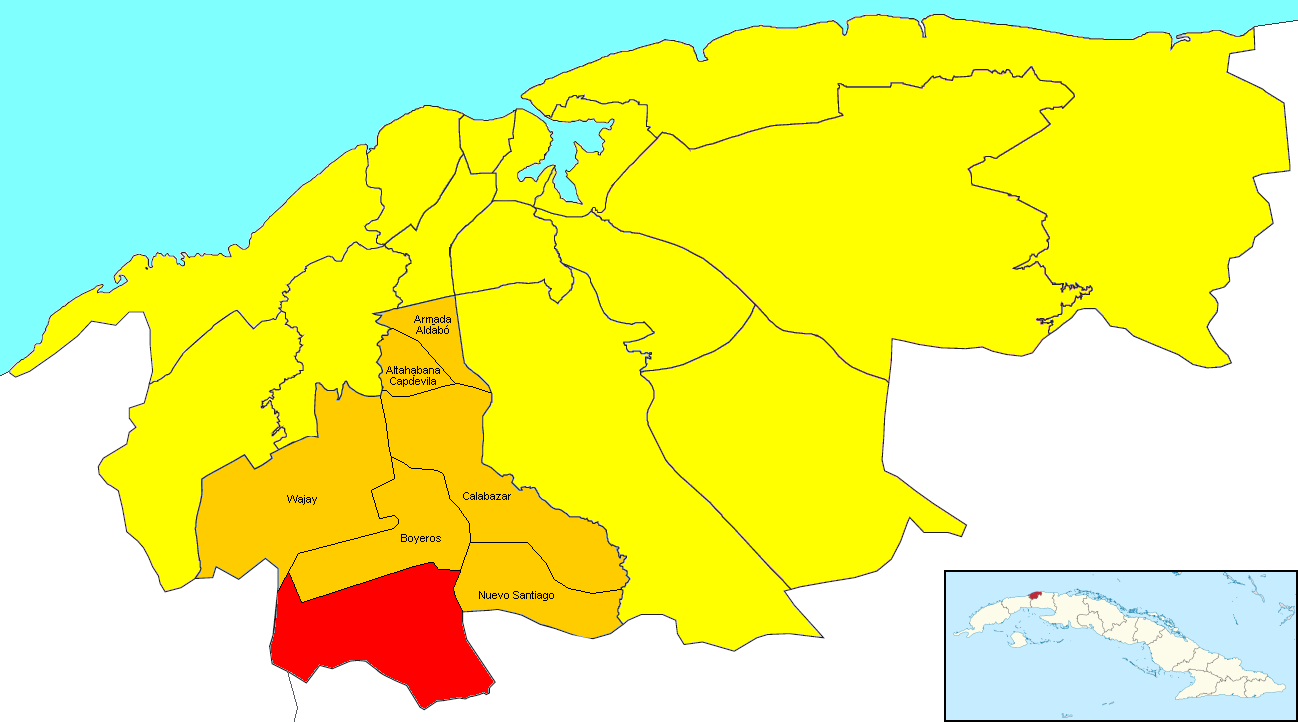
- Location of Santiago de las Vegas (red) within Boyeros (orange) and Havana

- Location of Santiago de las Vegas in Cuba
- Coordinates: 22°58′40″N 82°22′40″W
- Province: Havana
- Municipal borough: Boyeros
- Established: 1683
- Converted to being a Town: 1725 (town)
- Elevation: 90 m (300 ft)

Population
  - Estimate (2012): 32,958
- Time zone: UTC-5 (EST)
- Area code: +53-7

Santiago de las Vegas is a ward of Boyeros, a municipality of Havana, Cuba, located 20 km (12 mi) south of the city center. As of 2012, the population was 32,958. The Cuban government maintains an agricultural experiment station as well as a meteorology center in the city.

== History ==
The first settlement dates from 1683 when tobacco farmers settled on the lands of the ranches in Sócalo Hondo, Managua, Bejucal and La Chorrera, then under the jurisdiction of the Archdiocese of Santiago de Compostela. The population grew quickly and in 1694 the first church was built. On June 18, 1725, the settlement was incorporated as the town of Santiago de Compostela de las Vegas by royal certificate and was granted an extensive jurisdictional demarcation to the town. This marked a significant growth in its political and economic importance.

In 1824, the town was declared a city, allowing its people to raise a statue dedicated to the Spanish king Ferdinand VII, placed at the Recreo Square. In 1831, Ferdinand granted the city the title of Faithful and Very Illustrious City Council.

In 1836, a government land ownership was created for the city, but in 1840 was instead awarded to Bejucal; however, it was returned again to Santiago de las Vegas in 1845. The city's church was completed in 1800; one of its towers was destroyed by a hurricane in 1846. The cemetery was built in 1814 and closed in 1895 to make way for the new one constructed at that time. In 1911, the Consistorial House was built.

The population grew from 3300 in 1861 to almost 11,000 in 1953.

Santiago de las Vegas lost its municipality status in 1976 under the new Political-Administrative Division created by the government of Fidel Castro, and is now part of the new municipality of Boyeros, thus being amalgamated into the City of Havana.

On May 18, 2018, Cubana de Aviación Flight 0972 crashed in the ward, killing 112 of 113 passengers.

== Commerce and business ==
Transportation is one of the primary industries for the city. Geographically located between the increasingly greater metropolitan zones of the island and the rural region to the south and southwest of the province of Havana, it served as a distribution point of numerous passengers between these two regions. Its bus station was a title branch of the National Bus Station in Havana.

Here was born, in 1923, the Italian writer Italo Calvino. It was also the birthplace of the notorious scientist Juan Tomás Roig Mesa, renowned botanist well known by his work on medicinal and poisonous plants. Other notable sons of the city were ethnomusicologist Helio Orovio and mezzo-soprano Esther Borja.

In addition, Santiago de las Vegas has three of the most important sanatoriums of Cuba, the Psychiatric Hospital of Mazorra, the "Los Cocos" sanatorium for housing and caring of HIV/AIDS patients, and the Sanatorium of El Rincón for leprosy patients. The presence of these facilities has also increased the necessity of lodging and restaurants in the community.

== Tourism ==
The construction of the José Martí International Airport in Havana brought important opportunities for the development of the tourist industry. Santiago de las Vegas has natural, historical, cultural and religious points of interest. These opportunities have created another possible source of wealth for the city and its surroundings, leading to the construction of hotels, restaurants, and other facilities, as well as created new jobs.

The most massive religious celebration in Cuba is the festivity of San Lázaro, on December 17. On the days before, tens of thousands of devotees, revelers, tourists and curious gather in pilgrimage to the shrine of El Rincón, some of them dressed in sackcloth or purple clothing and carrying bizarre penances to pay gratitude to the miraculous San Lázaro, identified with the yoruba deity of Babalu Aye.
