= Battle of Coliseo =

- Part of Cuban War of Independence and Invasion from East to West in Cuba
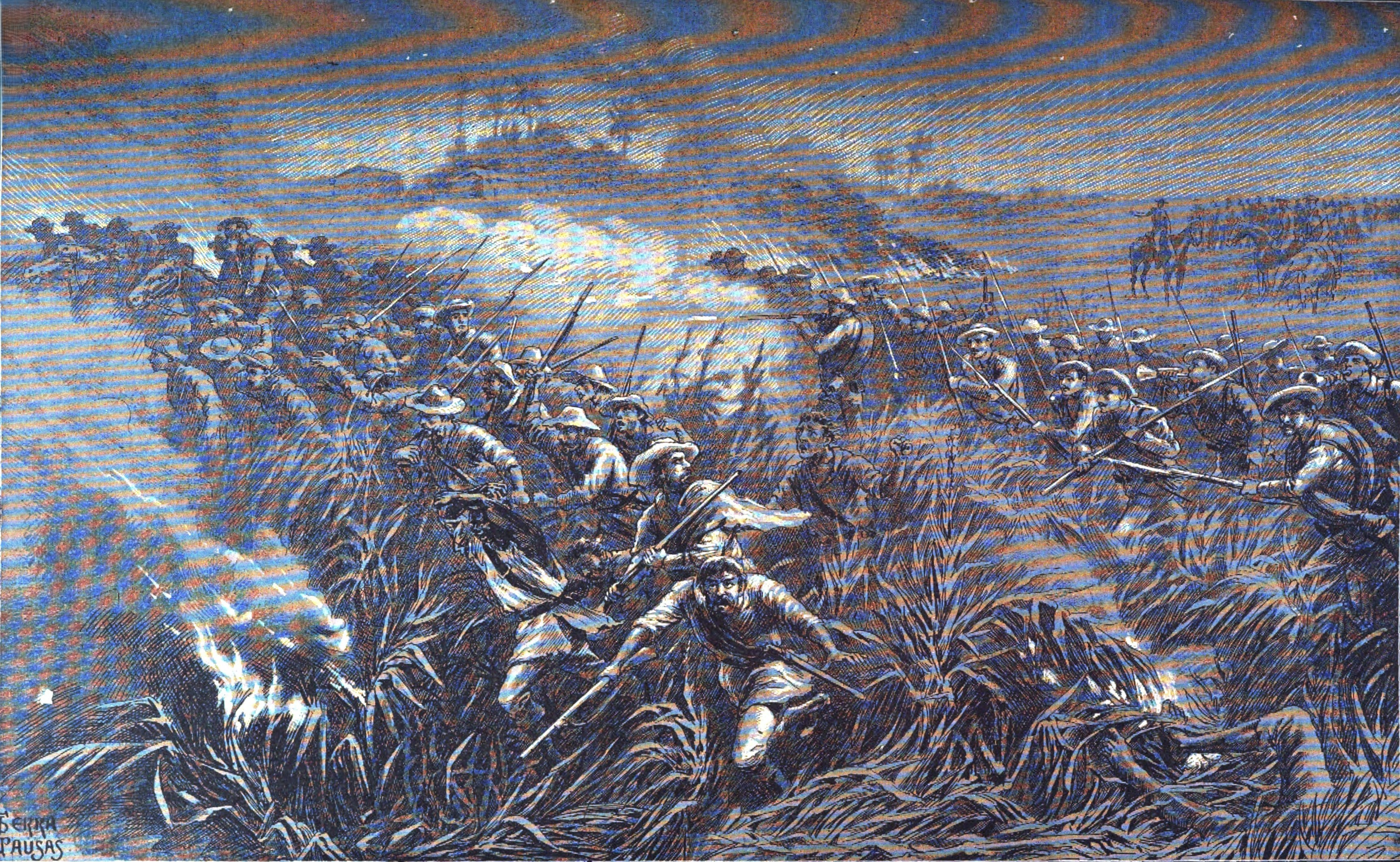
- Action of Coliseo - Dusk (illustration by Joán Serra y Pausas, 1896)
Date	December 23, 1895
Location	Cruces, Matanzas Province, Cuba
Result	Cuban victory

Belligerents
Cuban rebels	Spain

Commanders and leaders
Máximo Gómez; Antonio Maceo	General Prat; García Navarro; General Aldecoa; General Luque; Suárez Valdés

Strength
2,000 men	Two regiments

The Battle of Coliseo was a group of military actions carried out in the surroundings of the town of the same name, Matanzas Province, Cuba on December 23, 1895 during the Cuban War of Independence.

== Background ==
With the outbreak of the Cuban War of Independence in the spring of 1895, the Cuban independence forces once again constituted the Cuban Liberation Army. After several successful short campaigns for the Cubans, the Guáimaro Assembly was constituted in Arms in September of that year. Immediately after the government was formed, the Invasion to the West of the island began to be quickly prepared, which left Mangos de Baraguá on October 22. Crossing the entire island, the invading contingent of approximately 4,000 men, led by Major Generals Máximo Gómez and Antonio Maceo, reached the province of Matanzas in December and, by the end of that month, they were at the gates of the La Habana Province where the capital of the country was located. To enter the province, they had to carry out a series of military actions in the vicinity of the town of Coliseo, which gives its name to this battle.

== The Battle ==
The forces of Gómez and Maceo attacked, took and burned Coliseo, after little resistance from the garrison. Gómez knew that a formidable grouping of Spanish forces, under the command of Arsenio Martínez Campos, would try to impede his advance towards the capital.

Upon arrival, the Spanish troops were able to form their cadres. Maceo placed the cavalry to the left and deployed the infantry looking for the protection of the terrain. Both Mambi chiefs, followed by a hundred horsemen, charged the enemy; but they failed to break formation. Several insurgent officers were wounded and Maceo's horse was killed.

The Mambisa rearguard, under the command of then Commander Enrique Loynaz del Castillo, managed, despite enemy resistance, to occupy the ruins of the mill, in a violent action lasting only ten minutes. For his part, Gómez was able to remove the impedimenta, taking it along the royal road, in a movement that the adversary appreciated as a flanking maneuver, for which he opened artillery fire, withdrew and abandoned their positions.

Meanwhile, the invading vanguard continued its advance, followed by the center of the column, and both protected by the rear; later, Maceo sent in search of the rear, whose exit was assured by containment groups. The Mambisa troops reorganized and, at dusk, advanced towards Sumidero.

This action showed that the Spaniards, led personally by Arsenio Martínez Campos, could not contain the Cuban invasion march, which had a great political repercussion. After a few minutes of fighting, the battle was victorious for the Cubans.

== Aftermath ==
With the Cuban victory in this battle, the invading contingent managed to pass to the province of Havana without too much difficulty, where it continued its operations, in the face of the Spanish colonial power. For their part, the Spanish had to intensify the persecution against the Cubans and allocate more men and resources to the fight. However, the invading Cuban contingent reached the westernmost tip of the island on January 22, 1896, with Spain having failed in its attempts to stop the Cuban independence fighters.
