= Parque Lenin =

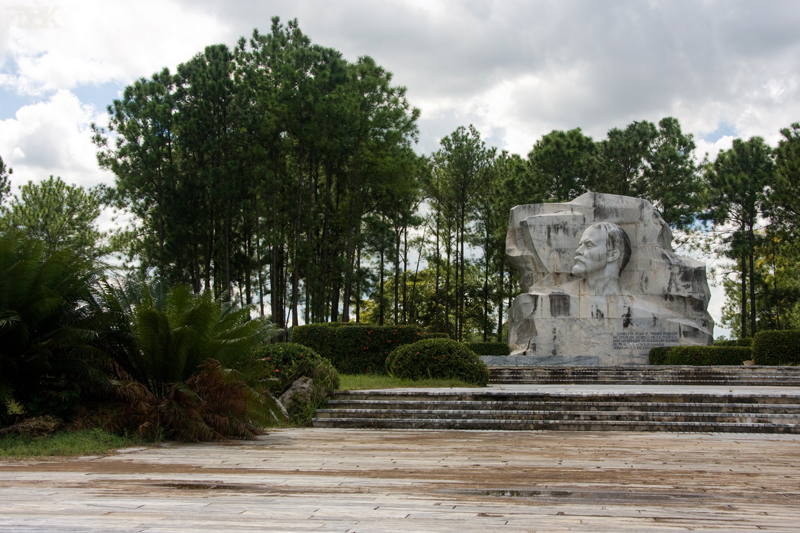
- Lenin monument in the park
- Interactive map of Parque Lenin
- Location: Havana, Cuba
- Coordinates: 23°01′25″N 82°21′25″W

Parque Lenin (English: Lenin Park) is a recreational park complex in Arroyo Naranjo, Havana, Cuba. It is Havana's largest recreational area, occupying 670 hectares (1,700 acres).

Once a popular destination for locals and tourists alike, it has suffered from prolonged neglect, and many of its attractions have either been destroyed or are no longer operating. Many of its facilities closed because of the COVID-19 pandemic and were still closed on the park's reopening in April 2022, its 50th anniversary.

== History and description ==
The idea of the park was conceived when Fidel Castro visited the nearby Rebel Arms Dam, then being built. Construction began in 1969 at the instigation and under the supervision of Celia Sánchez, one of Castro's closest associates, and was completed in 1972.

The ground was so poor that about 4,000,000 cubic metres (140,000,000 cu ft) had to be excavated and new soil put in, as well as all-new vegetation, including 80,000 mature trees. Among the more abundant plants are "cane brava, yagruma, ficus, pine and araucaria, cedar, mastic, caroline, triplaris, cyca and various palms." A small reservoir was also constructed.

The park was opened in 1972 with restaurants Las Ruinas, La Faralla and Los Jagüeyes; cafes Infusiones 1740 and El Galápago de Oro; food kiosks; an outdoor amphitheater with a floating stage over the reservoir; and an aquarium. Other attractions, some added later, include the "Parque Mariposa", an amusement park with rides (possibly in response to the opening of Walt Disney World in 1971 in nearby Florida); swimming pools; a steam train for transportation within the central part of the park, with 9 kilometres (5.6 mi) of track; an art gallery; and a monument to Lenin by Soviet realist sculptor Lev Kerbel.

When the park reopened in April 2022, only six of the 17 Parque Mariposa rides were working, and those shut down within a year.
