= Battle of Calimete =

- Part of Cuban War of Independence
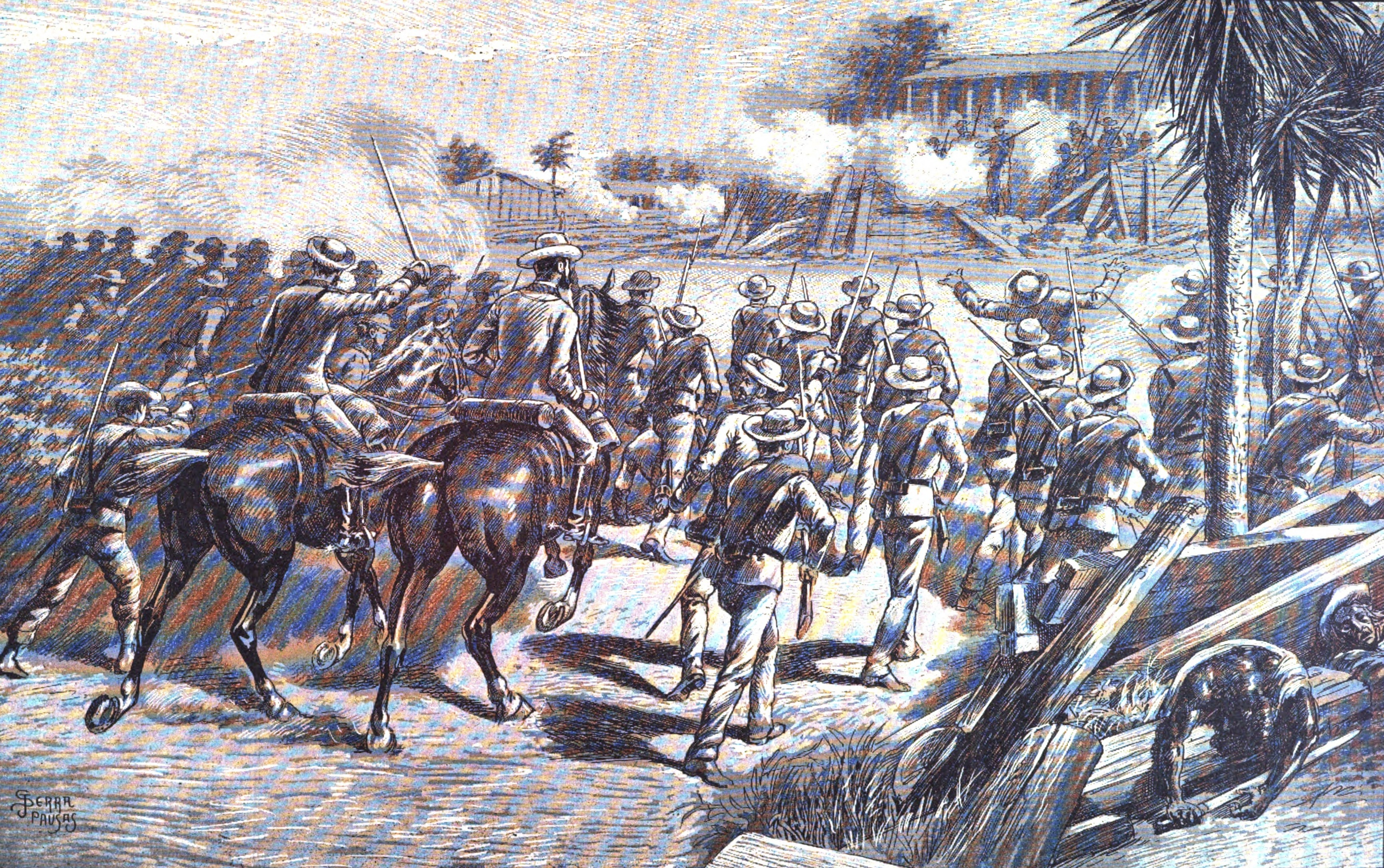
- Illustration of the battle by Joán Serra y Pausas (1896)
Date	December 29, 1895
Location	Calimete, Matanzas Province, Cuba
Result	Cuban victory

Belligerents
Cuban rebels	Spain

Commanders and leaders
Máximo Gómez; Antonio Maceo; Serafín Sánchez	Emilio Perera

Strength
4,000 Infantry	850 Infantry

Casualties and losses
16 dead and 69 wounded	22 dead and 75 wounded

The Battle of Calimete was a battle of the Cuban War of Independence on December 29, 1895, which was led by Cuban independence activists Máximo Gómez, Antonio Maceo and later on, Serafín Sánchez.

== Background ==
Cuban troops camped on the night of December 28 in the ruins of the Triunfana sugar mill, about two kilometers northeast of Calimete. During the early morning hours, the main Cuban leaders, including Major General Serafín Sánchez, were conferring and giving instructions to subordinate leaders. Maceo personally verified the disposition of the forces and their preparation for the imminent combat. An outpost was located about 400 meters from the town, on the road from Calimete to Triunfana. The Spanish troops arrived by train, coming from Real Campiña, between 04:30 and 05:00 hours, and formed in order of march with the front towards the Cuban camp. The main Spanish commander was Lieutenant Colonel Emilio Perera, who was unaware of the presence of the liberators and had to move east because his mission was to go to Sabana Vieja located in that direction.

== The Battle ==
In the Mambí camp, the target was hit and the men immediately prepared for action. The Spanish column began the march at 06:30 while a thick fog still covered the entire terrain. His vanguard, in which Lieutenant Colonel Perera marched, was made up of a company under the command of Captain Cabello and his extreme guard was made up of the cavalry platoon that received the first shots from the Cuban advance, which immediately fell back on the infantry. The enemy continued to advance for some 1,200 meters until it was contained by the fire generated by the Cuban infantry, which responded while withdrawing, taking action on the road and the surrounding cane fields.

Gómez and Maceo witnessed the execution of a prisoner sentenced to death for violating the honor of a woman. The Spanish projectiles began to arrive there. The enemy cavalry platoon fell back to leave the infantry action. At those moments the horse of the Spanish chief fell, who received a strong blow and had to hand over command to Captain Cabello.

The Cuban vanguard, which had already started the advance when the combat began, stopped waiting for orders. The objective of Gómez and Maceo was to continue the march towards the West as soon as possible. For this reason, although the facilities of the mill offered an excellent defensive position, they did not try to sustain the combat there and, on the other hand, there was a great danger that other Spanish columns would come that could ruin the invasion. The left flank of the Spaniards tried to force the right flank of the Cubans, to force them to lie on the right and force the outcome. The insurrectionary infantry took refuge in the walls of the mill and with effective fire contained the attack.

The Cuban command ordered the charge against the enemy's right flank to alleviate the pressure it exerted, but it was necessary to give several charges because the Spanish infantry remained firm in their positions. These attacks by the Cuban cavalry were personally directed by Major General Serafín Sánchez, who finally achieved his objective. Later, although the enemy troops maintained their position, their offensive capacity was diminished and their command ordered the withdrawal on Calimete, relying on the reserves.

== Aftermath ==
The Spanish casualties were 22 dead and 75 wounded. The Cubans had 16 dead and 69 wounded. The invading column was organized in order of march still under fire from the Spanish reserve, carrying a convoy of 36 wounded, some of which were serious wounds. After being attacked on two more occasions, she arrived at Mostacilla at 9:00 p.m. that day, about 12 km northwest of Colón.

This combat represented a decisive moment for the "Invasion". After brilliantly executing the "Lazo de la Invasión" and leaving the Spanish forces in the limits of Cienfuegos Province, the invading troops meet a Spanish column in the surroundings of Calimete, causing a devastating defeat and obtaining this way an easy entry into the La Habana Province, moving the war almost to the capital of the Captaincy General of Cuba.
