= Wajay =

- Ward of Havana
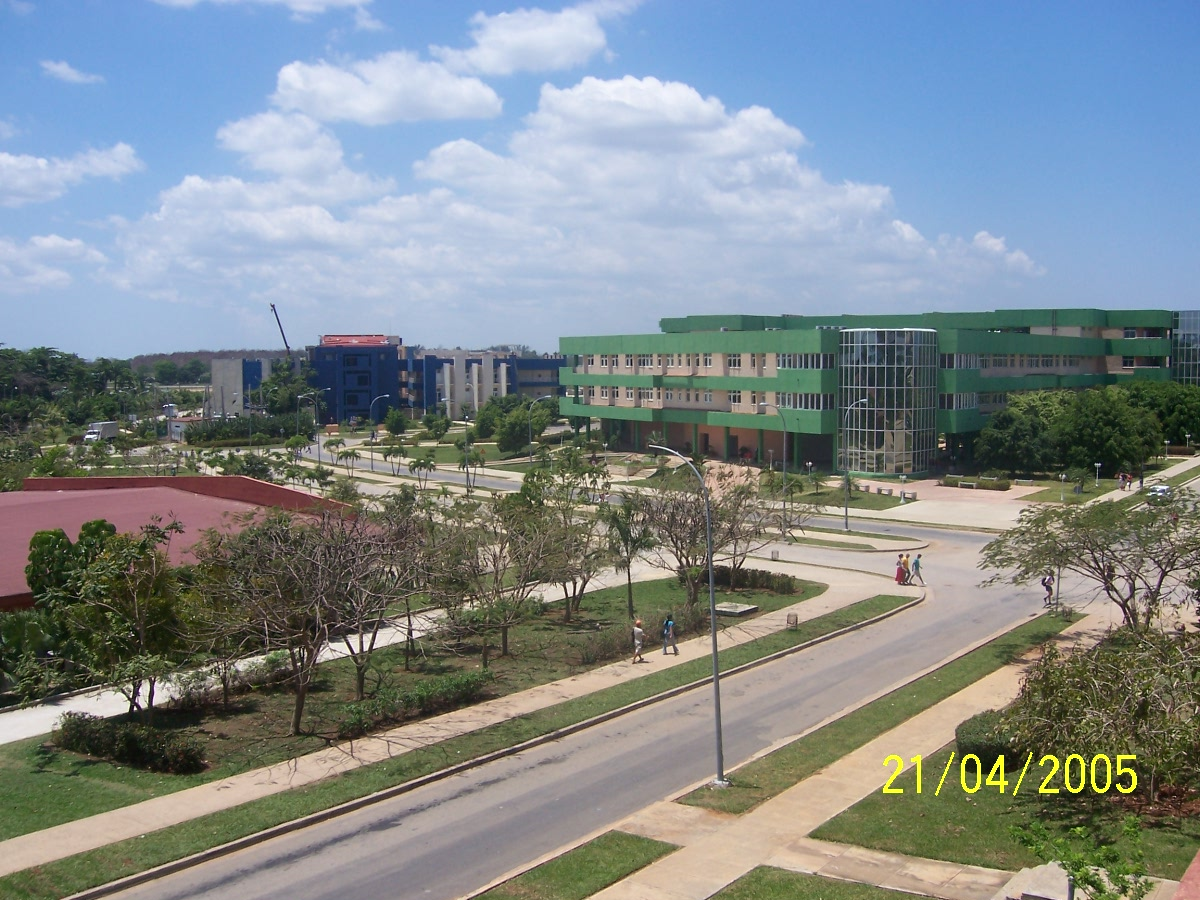
- University of Information Science

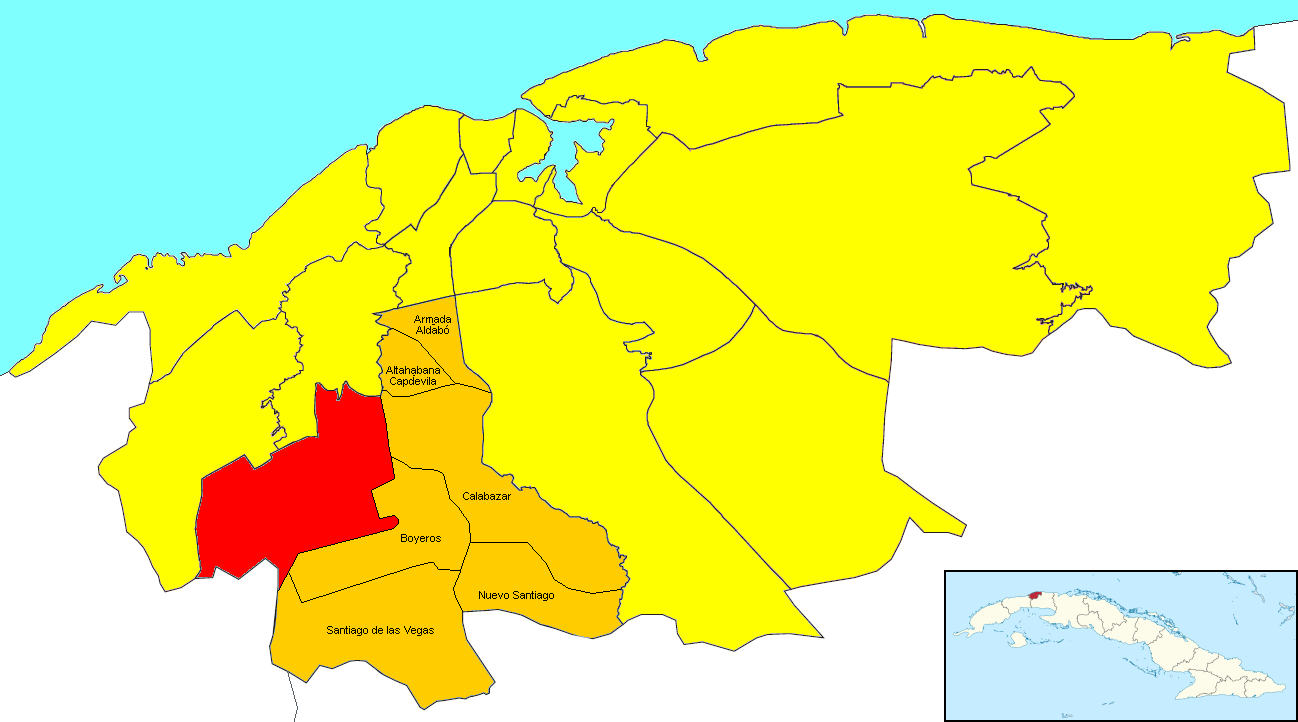
- Location of Wajay (red) within Boyeros (orange) and Havana

- Location of Wajay in Cuba
- Coordinates: 23°00′16.2″N 82°25′28.2″W
- Country: Cuba
- Province: Ciudad de La Habana
- Municipal borough: Boyeros
- Established: 1720
- Elevation: 60 m (200 ft)

Population (2011)
  - Total: 47,954
- Time zone: UTC-5 (EST)
- Area code: +53-7

Wajay is a ward (consejo popular, "people's council") of the city of Havana, the capital of Cuba, belonging to the municipal borough of Boyeros. In 2011, it had a population of 47,954.

== History ==
Its origins go back to the period bequeathed by the aborigines of the Cacique Habaguanex region, when the Indians who populated the island nicknamed the humid lands full of large trees, streams and gaps with the expressions: Guajay> Yubajay> Jubajay, territories that will form part after Havana.

This first settlement developed as a result of agrarian and peasant growth in an extensive wetland. In the first moments of the Spanish colonization it was granted the property to Martín Recio de Oquendo on June 29, 1575, which was henceforth the corral of "Sacalohondo".

In 1688, Diego Avelino de Compostela founded the "curatos del campo" and the parishes of Santiago el Mayor and Lady of Candelaria. Its initial writing with letter -w- is not defined until year 1762, when the taking of Havana by the English -June 6- and the influence becoming of the Anglo-Saxon language marks its new and later name "Wajay".

Starting in 1764, the church of the village was completed on the land Don Dionisio de Berroa, a relative of Don Esteban, who had left the lands of the “Sacalohondo” corral to his children. Times when the "town" had: 49 guano houses, 20 built of bricks and stones, clay and tiles; some tobacco shops, a store and a bakery distributed in three streets with ditches in which riveruelas ran that ended in small spillways.

Its international renown is felt when the famous German naturalist Alexander von Humboldt, (1767–1835) researcher who studied the climate in "the Indies" -Cuba- and the marine currents of Peru or the Humboldt Current, cited in his studies to the climate of Havana !, in which he placed the Wajay: “5 maritime leagues from the city, on the plain that was 28 toises above sea level, the partial average temperature in December 1795 was 18.8 degrees and in 1800 it ranged between 13.8 and 18.9 ”.

In 1860, the neighborhood already had a primary school, a sugar mill, two roof tiles, 4 coffee plantations, 12 quarries, 16 pastures and 116 work sites where different crops were harvested, among which stood out: legumes, coffee, chayotes, yucca and island taro.

The Havana City Council, the founding of Marianao as an independent municipality, dates back to 1878, although since 1870 the demands to obtain said proclamation were raised to the Governor General of the Island. This was achieved after the end of the Ten Years' War when several municipalities emerged under the protection of the new Municipal Law.

== Neocolonial Republic ==
At the beginning of the 20th century, (1902) Neocolonial Republic, the Wajay became part of the political-administrative jurisdiction of the Municipality of Marianao. The conflicts of the Estrada Palma government produce the first clash between the natives of the town of what was later, the civil war, according to Enrique Loynaz del Castillo, a patriot who led the fighting of: Babiney-Colorado and the Wajay on 14 September 1906. Event in which the town gates felt the rifle butt, and the houses were taken by the guard, the blood ran, a child died and General Loynaz del Castillo was wounded with a machete blow to the head.

The Spanish Guard Barracks, current Paquito Gonzáles School, formerly the town's Basic High School, was inaugurated on September 26, 1942, an installation that was also the town's first Public Primary School No. 29, named “Elisa Godinez de Batista”. A lady who encouraged the construction of the recreation work -Parque de Wajay- at its doors (1943), a space in which the traditional "Coffee Party" is celebrated today. In 1943 it had a population of 4,535, that grew in the last decades of the 20th century.

== Coffee party ==
After the triumph of the Revolution, the town became a section of the Boyeros region. In the 1960s some 100 million coffee bushes were planted throughout the area. Stage in which the plantation of the grain was generalized, building facilities for pulping, drying coffee. Program that compromised the agricultural extension of the entire region that surrounded Havana.

Cradle of coffee in Cuba whose tradition is celebrated every year with the name of Fiesta del Café, one of the oldest traditions of the Capital, a great carnival with parades of floats and comparsas as well as the traditional Colada de Café Gigante colada that starts the festivities every November.

In the last presentation Casa de la Cultura Wajay (2013) the first historian of the town Gerardo Gandarilla Gómez (deceased) stated: “It has been confirmed that Don José Gelabert, introduced in the country some seeds of the grain from the coffee plantations of Haiti, in 1748, appearing the farm "Las Columnas", the main entrance to the town (east highway) as the "First coffee plantation in Cuba". This leaves without effect the generalized in popular memory as the "La Aurora" coffee plantation located in an old house located on the Morales farm, south highway of the town of Murgas, Santa Cecilia.

== Geography ==
Located in the south-western suburb of Havana, Wajay borders with the municipal boroughs of Marianao and La Lisa, and with the municipality of Bauta, in Artemisa Province.

The ward is divided into the quarters (repartos) of Wajay (centre), Abel Santamaría, Fontanar, El Chico, El Morado, INVAF and Santa Cecilia.

== Transport ==
Located north to José Martí International Airport, Wajay is crossed by a branch of the A2 motorway linking it (the airport) to the city centre. It is served by 5 stations (Fontanar, Mazorra, Abel Santamaría, Wajay and Murgas) of the Havana Suburban Railway.

== Personalities ==
- Jorge Perugorría (b. 1965), actor
- Gerardo Gandarilla Gómez (2 de julio 1926), historiador de Wajay.

== See also ==
- Havana Psychiatric Hospital (Mazorra)
- University of Information Science
