= Boyeros =

Rancho Boyeros Municipio de Rancho Boyeros
- Municipal borough in Havana
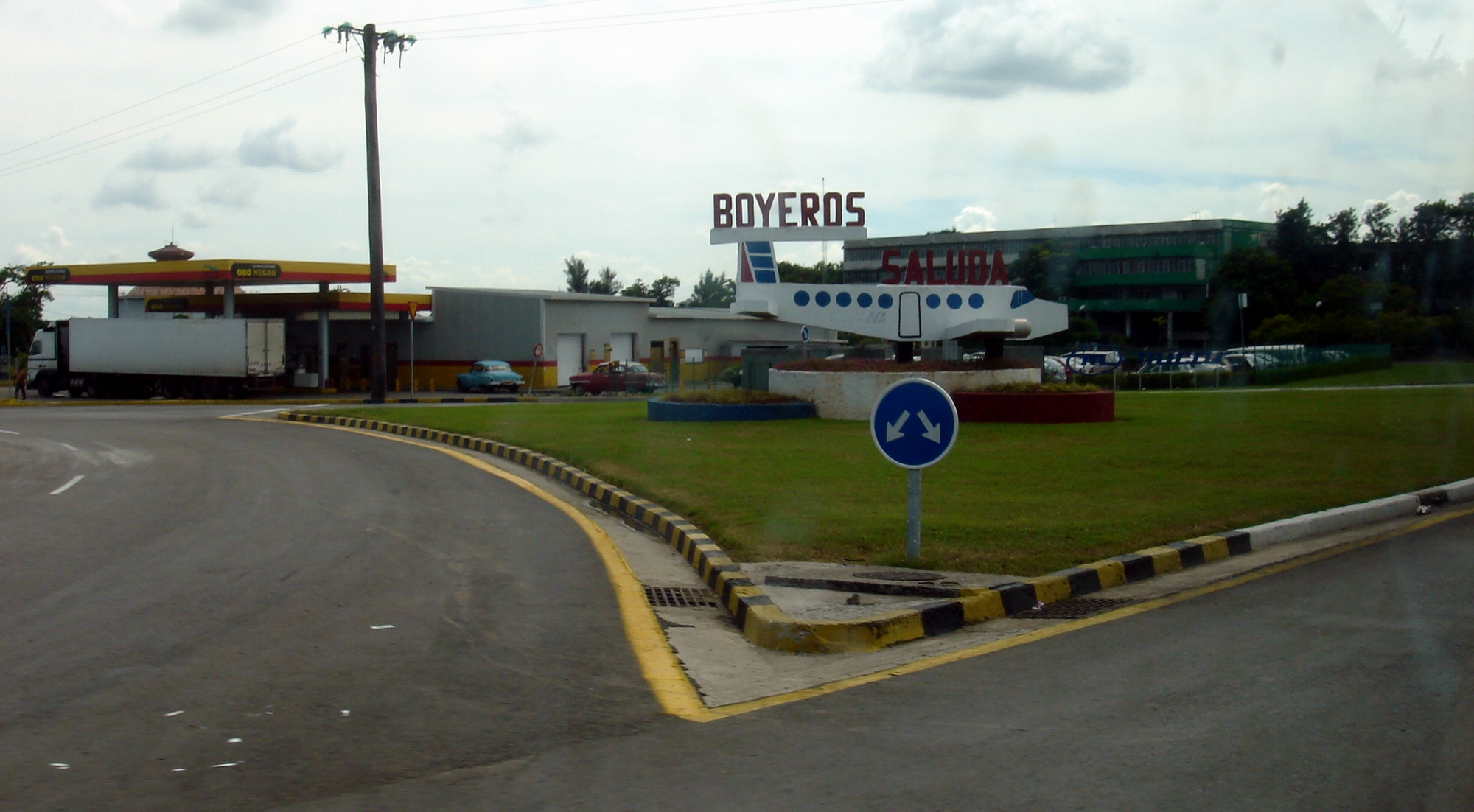
- Welcome sign in Boyeros near airport

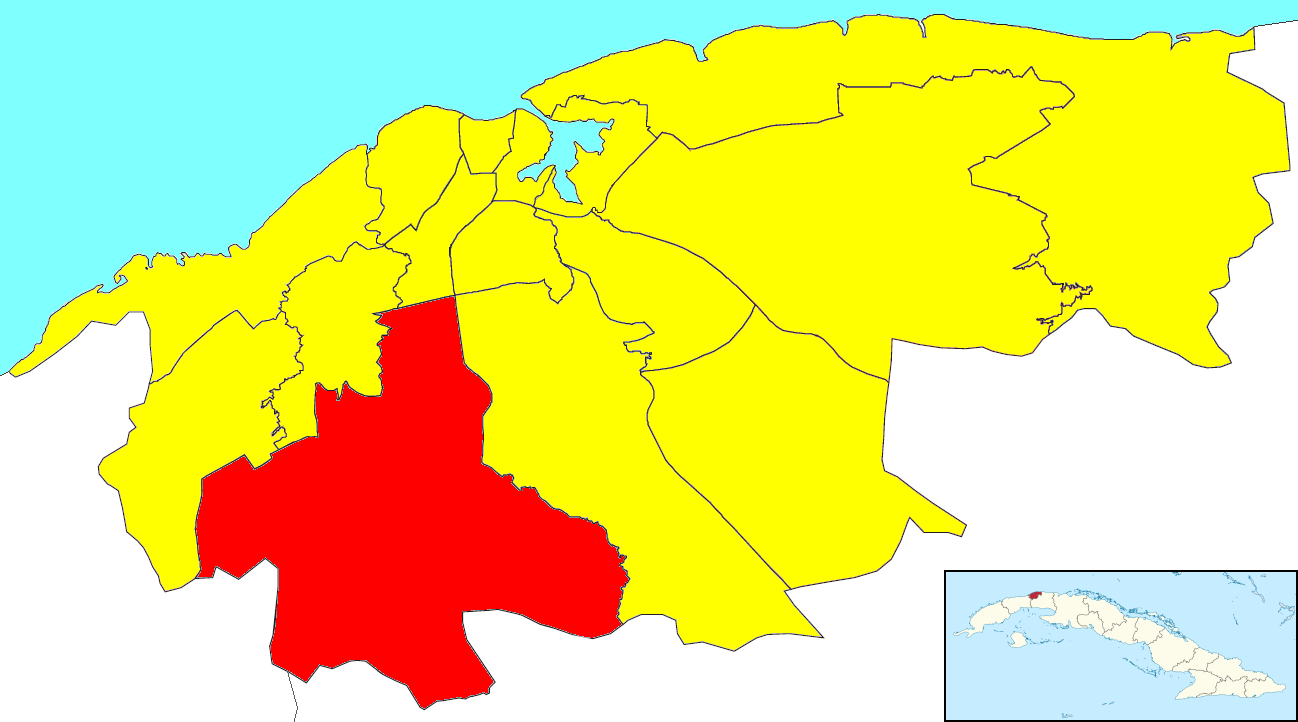
- Location of Boyeros in Havana
- Coordinates: 23°00′26″N 82°24′6″W
- Country: Cuba
- Province: Havana
- Established: 1976 (Municipality)
- Wards (Consejos Populares): Altahabana-Capdevila, Armada-Aldabó, Boyeros, Calabazar, Nuevo Santiago, Santiago de Las Vegas, Wajay

Area
  - Total: 134 km^{2} (52 sq mi)
- Elevation: 65 m (213 ft)

Population (2022)
  - Total: 204,003
  - Density: 1,520/km^{2} (3,940/sq mi)
- Time zone: UTC-5 (EST)
- Area code: +53-7

Boyeros (Spanish pronunciation: [boˈʝeɾos]) is one of the 15 municipalities in Havana, Cuba. The municipality was created in 1976, and amalgamated the town of Santiago de Las Vegas. It lies on the southwestern side of Havana and includes José Martí International Airport.

== History ==
During the 18th, 19th and early part of the 20th century, large waves of Canarian people emigrated to Boyeros. In such a way, it was born the first settlement of the area known as Santiago de las Vegas. Since 1694. this name was also shortened as Las Vegas.

== Demographics ==
In 2022, the municipality of Boyeros had a population of 204,003. With a total area of 134 km^{2} (52 sq mi), it has a population density of 1,500/km^{2} (3,900/sq mi). It is divided into seven consejos populares (wards): Santiago de Las Vegas, Nuevo Santiago, Boyeros, Wajay (close to the airport), Calabazar, Altahabana-Capdevila and Armada-Aldabó.

== Economics ==
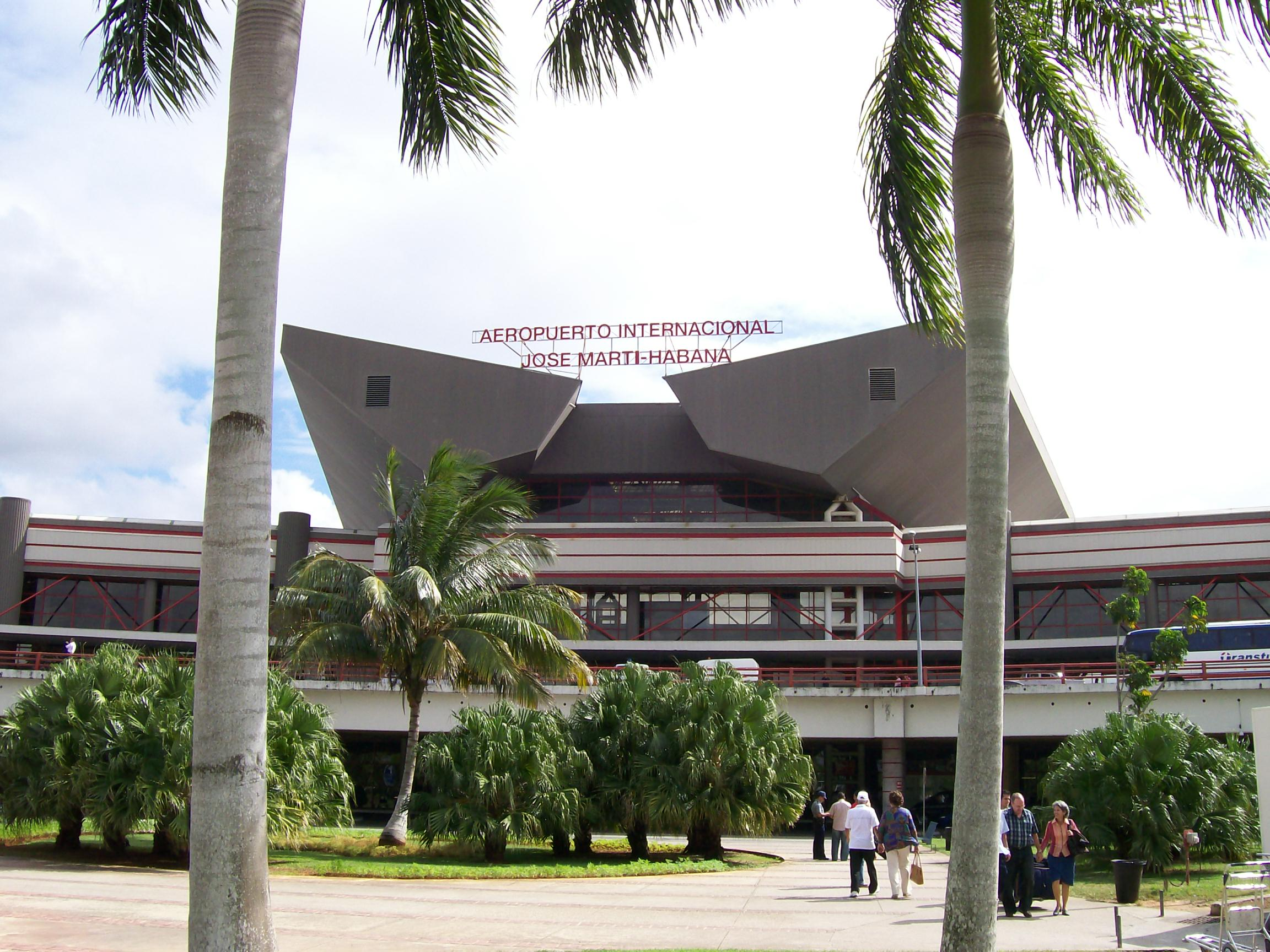
José Martí International Airport

The main industrial outcomes of the local companies include paper and cardboard containers, woven and spun semifinished products, drugs, building materials, food products, etc. Boyeros hosts the Instituto de Investigaciones Fundamentales para la Agricultura Tropical ("International Institute for the Investigation of Tropical Agriculture", INIFAT), which was preceded by the Estación Experimental Agronómica de Cuba as the first agronomic research station founded in Latin America in 1904.

The municipality of Boyeros is home to José Martí International Airport (former Rancho-Boyeros Airport) which connects Havana with many international destinations.

== Healthcare and education ==
Boyeros harbours seven general hospitals, two healthcare facilities, five hospital dental departments, 263 medical studies, 7 pregnancy care centers and a grandfather's house for third-agers people, a Centro de Investigaciones de Medicina Tradicional, Asiática y Natural ("Research Center for Traditional, Asiatic and Natural Medicine", CIMTAN), a day time psychiatric hospital, among others.

The municipality has 34 kindergartens, 50 primary schools, 15 lower secondary education centers, six special schools, 4 agrarian schools, a multi-lingual school, a professionalizing institute and a polytechnic high school with optional path of studies in gastronomy, metallurgy, real estate or veterinary medicine.

== Sport ==
Santiago de las Vegas hosted the first field hockey game ever in the Republic of Cuba, followed by the creation of the "Antonio Maceo" National Hockey Center not far from the Havana golf field opened in 1955.

Boyers overcomes 14 sport buildings of which there are 5 baseball parks, a chess academy, a table tennis field and a shooting gallery.

Among the local sport personalities there are the famous players Juan Padilla, Pedro Chávez and Orlando Hernández.

== Culture ==
The municipality has five culture houses, a museum, a library, an art center, an art gallery and two cinemas. It has also three traditional feast days: La fiesta del café ("the coffee feast") in Wajay, Las parrandas santiaguera ("the faith healers parade") in Santiago de las Vegas, and the annual anniversary of the Calabazar's foundation.

The National Zoological Park of Boyeros contains 800 animals belonging to more than one hundred different species, towards an extension of 340 hectares. It is designed in compliance with the state-of-the-art international standards for the zoological exposition of specimen in freedom and, by that, it is a special attraction for nature lovers.

== See also ==
- Havana Psychiatric Hospital (Mazorra)
- List of cities in Cuba
- Municipalities of Cuba
