= La Reforma Campaign =

- Part of Cuban War of Independence
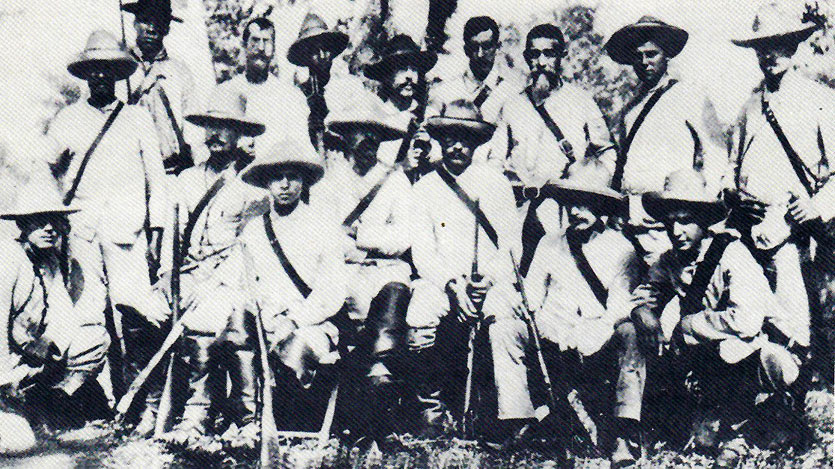
- The General Staff of the campaign
Date	January 27, 1897 – April 1898
Location	Pastures of La Reforma, Jatibonico, Santa Clara, Cuba
Result	Cuban victory

Belligerents
Cuban rebels	Spain

Commanders and leaders
Máximo Gómez; Francisco Carrillo; José M. R. Rodríguez	Valeriano Weyler

Units involved
4th Army Corps; 5th Liberation Corps; 6th Liberation Corps	

Strength
600 mambises	40,000 infantry

Casualties and losses
Light casualties	25,000 killed

The La Reforma Campaign was a campaign of the Cuban War of Independence which was waged for 16 months with the Cuban forces under the command of Máximo Gómez against the Spanish forces under the command of Valeriano Weyler. Despite the Spanish outnumbering the Cuban forces by 40,000 to 600, Gómez's guerrilla warfare tactics as well as the weather caused over 40 Spanish soldiers to die each day throughout the campaign. His approach was to divide his forces into tiny guerrilla groups and fight alone with his General Staff while continuously moving.

He also didn't let the Spanish columns that persecute him sleep in the open field, nor in the towns that he shot with scattered groups in a ring around them despite the Spanish efforts to find and fail to find him. Gómez's strategy consisting of using environmental conditions such as the excessive heat, the poor roads, the river floodings and the disease, the morale against the inexperienced Spanish soldiers who didn't eat, who didn't sleep and who get sick due to environmental conditions, using information from the Spanish, supported by an effective intelligence service and tracking the objectives of the Spanish forces.

== Background ==
The situation for the Cuban 5th and 6th Liberation Army Corps became increasingly difficult since the large concentration of troops and means arranged by the Spanish high command in Cuba, the losses of important military leaders such as Antonio Maceo Grajales and the lack of supplies due to the foreign aid arriving at the eastern half of the island. Matters didn;t help with the Government of the Republic in Arms lacking any ability to contact with the western portions of Cuba.

With the fall of Maceo, Valeriano Weyler proclaimed the pacification of those territories, despite their difficult situation, the Cuban troops maintained constant confrontations with the Colonial Army. Gómez, aware of Weyler's theory that if Martí and Maceo were killed, it be enough to wipe out the Cuban forces and crush the revolution, decided to execute a plan based on the following:

If I go to Havana, the war in the West ends and I give Weyler the pleasure: those regions are almost organized and when I go, I can take few resources at the disposal of those who will have the Spaniards to pursue me. On the other hand, if I stay here, I force Weyler to come look for me, and since he has many soldiers in Las Trochas, military lines (Which he clumsily maintains) and he does not dare to leave, he will have to get the soldiers out of Pinar del Río, Havana, Matanzas and Sagua La Grande to pursue me; in this way, our forces in those territories will regroup and have respite, having helped them to do so without looking for useless effects.

== Course of the campaign ==
To develop such an important campaign, Gómez conceived of planning it in such a way that Weyler would be forced to launch a large number of soldiers, on the theater of operations chosen by him. He would have to head for the pastures of La Reforma, a small area of just 70 km². in the jurisdiction of Sancti Spíritus, bounded on the West by the Río Jatibonico del Norte, the Río Jatibonico del Sur and on the East by the Trocha de Júcaro a Morón, defended by 10,000 Spanish soldiers.

The Generalissimo knew the composition of the troops that would attack him, giving the Spanish the preference for infantry weapons, the use of artillery and numerous impediments, supported by the few cavalry stationed which made the columns become heavier and slower, lacking mobility and poor maneuverability. He was given with this knowledge along with the exploration system that he kept on his adversary, as well as the cavalry patrols that watched all the roads and troop movements, the strategically advantageous topography of the terrain were the fundamental elements that he used. Gómez was also fundamentally characterized by his great mobility, knowledge of enemy maneuvers and the physical and moral exhaustion of his opponents.

The general characteristic was not to present frontal combats, which could lead to great losses in men and war resources, and to subject the enemy to constant harassment day and night, which would wear him down. His tactics were clearly exposed in a communication sent to the Chief of the Division of the 4th Army Corps, Division General José de Jesús Monteagudo Consuegra, where he explained:

…the time has come to fight hard like you. knows how to do it. Don't rush people into compromised sets. Try to wage infantry warfare, from ambush to ambush, guard your horses and take advantage of the night, securing your position, the dump; by day to occupy it, and at night and without danger, burst UD. a column of 1000 men with only 20, because it prevents you from sleeping and the next day those soldiers will be down and you catch them weaker...

The General-in-Chief always awaited his enemies close to their movements so he could withdraw but close enough to him to observe and taking precautions to allow him to freely advance when he deems it convenient, returning to the enemy rear to attack without ceasing.

To exercise his campaign, Gómez proceeded to restructure his forces that would participate in it. For this, he restructured the 4th Army Corps which included the military portion but also the civilian one, giving great importance to the prefectures and the cooperation of the civilian population.

The General's escort and the expeditionary regiment commanded by Colonel Armando Sánchez, added 600 men to the combined Cuban army and it formed the main body of Gómez's forces. The rest of the troops that made up the 4th Army Corps carried out independent support actions, such as interrupting the movement of enemy columns although on occasions, they directly supported actions carried out by Gómez.

=== February–May 1897 ===
Once all the essential elements were conceived to carry out the campaign, the Cubans had to distract the Spanish forces to the jurisdiction of Sancti Spíritus. Gómez achieved this by misinforming the Spanish army about his true intentions, inducing them to make mistakes. To do this, he relied on operational stratagems or deceptions and strategies through which he simulated concentrations of forces in the province as well as spreading the rumor that they were preparing an invasion to the west, caused information addressed to Cuban leaders to reach the hands of the enemy in which he promised to march towards the West as soon as possible.

The attack on Arroyo Blanco, a fortified town, had a heliograph which allowed direct communication with Sancti Spíritus and telegraph connections to Havana which was another of his operations to deceive the enemy. On January 27, Major General Francisco Carrillo Morales, head of the 4th Army Corps, began the siege of the town, where a compressed air cannon is used by the mambises.

In Gómez's campaign diary he wrote:

my main purpose is to see how to force Weyler to move large forces over these Las Villas jurisdictions, weakening those he has deployed over Matanzas, Havana and Pinar del Río

In aid of the siege of Arroyo Blanco, the Spanish Army sends a strong column from Ciego de Ávila, which is intercepted in the pastures of Juan Criollo. Before the charge of the mambises, the Spanish command ordered to deploy their troops and carry out rifle discharges that caused casualties to the mambises. After the rejection, the Spanish continued towards Arroyo Blanco, freeing that plaza from the site to which it was exposed.

The battle, although not victorious for Gómez's troops, from the tactical point of view, it did constitute a response to their objectives. After the engagement, Weyler installed his General Headquarters in Sancti Spíritus and stationed more than 50,000 men in the territories of Sancti Spíritus, Cienfuegos and Santa Clara. 40,000 of them in the jurisdiction of Sancti Spíritus without dismantling his trails, which in turn, they increased their rounds, vigils and listening systems.

Falling into Gómez's trap, Weyler ordered:

...the main mission of the brigades and demi-brigades will be to destroy the enemy's resources, watch over the passes to the West, and in the event of crossing large parties immediately pursue them (... ) focusing his forces on those necessary to beat him...

However, in the face of such concentrations of the Spanish army, Gómez continued his actions tirelessly, waging strong combat against a larger force such an example at the Battle of Santa Teresa on March 8 – 9, 1897. The Cuban army engaged the well organized Spanish forces, who engaged in bloody position combat that ceased at nightfall, during the night, the Spaniards were continuously harassed by the Cuban forces, who protected themselves by a listening system placed by the Generalissimo. At dawn when the combat resumed, the impedimenta and the health of the Cuban forces were stabilized, producing a strong combat, which, given the enemy superiority, occupied the Cuban positions.

Gómez foresaw that, due to the topographical characteristics of the terrain, that the enemy would withdraw towards Arroyo Blanco and ordered his troops a series of ambushes and harassment, which caused the enemy heavy casualties; he ordered his withdrawal to La Reforma.

The Cuban forces continued to operate successfully, forcing the Spanish command to reorganize its army, with the aim of increasing operations during the month of May despite the season of intense rains and abundant heat, which made their actions difficult. With this strategy, Weyler tried to turn his military operations around and operate with his troops directly subordinate to him, between the Río Jatibonico del Norte and Río Jatibonico del Sur and the Trocha de Júcaro a Morón.

Faced with this new measure of the Spanish command that increased the persecution of the mambises, Gómez put forward continuous movement of his troops in various directions, including the jurisdiction of Remedios in long days under a climate not conducive to the Spaniards, who were forced to exhausting daytime shifts, under strong sun, rain and subjected to constant nightly harassment. Gómez ordered the 4th Army Corps to move to the rear of the enemy which in a first phase weren't carried out and instead of operating on Sagua, Cienfuegos and Matanzas, were attacked near the jurisdiction of Sancti Spíritus spending a large amount of resources. This made Gómez's situation more difficult but neither did it mean that the 4th Army Corps led by General Francisco Carrillo Morales and José María Rodríguez Rodríguez were inactive, operating at the enemy's rear.
