= Battle of El Salado (1869) =

1868 battle of the Ten Years' War

- Part of Ten Years' War
Date	January 7, 1869
Location	El Salado, Río Cauto, Granma Province, Captaincy General of Cuba
Result	Cuban victory

Belligerents
Cuban rebels	Spain

Commanders and leaders
Gen. Donato Mármol	Gen. Blas Villate, Count of Valmaseda

Strength
4,000 mambises	3,000

Casualties and losses
2,000	Unknown

The Battle of El Salado occurred on January 7, 1869, during the Ten Years' War, near Salado River and the Salado settlement (Spanish: El Salado), in the municipality of Río Cauto, Granma Province, in Cuba.

== History ==
In the wake of the Battle of Bonilla and the retreat of Spanish troops to San Miguel de Bagá, Blas Villate, tasked with suppressing the rebellion, remained stationed while waiting for additional reinforcements. With his forces bolstered, Villate's column headed towards Eastern Cuba to reclaim Bayamo, while enduring ongoing harassment from the mambises of Camagüey. Once his march crossed through the territory of Camagüey, he faced harassment from forces in Las Tunas.

Cuban general Donato Mármol's forces were ordered from Santiago de Cuba to Bayamo to prevent Blas Villate, Count of Valmaseda's march on Bayamo. The Spanish column, comprising approximately 3,000 troops from all three branches of the Spanish military and supported by four pieces of artillery, was equipped with Peabody rifles for its infantry. In contrast, Donato Mármol led a force of around 4,000 men, most of whom were poorly armed, with some carrying machetes while the majority had no weapons.

The Spanish column set out from Las Tunas, reaching Las Arenas on the 6th, before proceeding towards the Salado River. Mármol, instead of waiting for the enemy at the Cauto River and taking advantage of its natural defense, advanced to meet them at El Salado.

Mármol aimed to trap and destroy Valmaseda's army by adopting the tactics previously employed by Generals Francisco Vicente Aguilera and Modesto Díaz at Guabatuabo. He positioned his defenses at El Salado, near Guamo Embarcadero, around 30 miles from Bayamo, ready for the enemy's arrival.

== The Battle ==
On January 7, 1869, at the Salado River, the passage of the Spanish column was contested by a force of 4000 men led by Gen. Donato Mármol. Gen. Valmaseda, leveraging his superior experience, outflanked Donato Mármol and surprised the main body of the Cuban forces, resulting in a complete rout. The machete-wielding men charged between the cannons who had opened fire in defense, resulting in heavy losses and the capture of two flags.

== Aftermath ==
Mármol retreated to the left bank of the Cauto River, leaving behind the dead and wounded. Villate continued with his army along the river bank and finally succeeded in crossing the Cauto. When informed of the approaching Spanish forces, Cuban Colonel Pío Rosado ordered Antonio Maceo to organize an ambush. Maceo, on January 8, 1869, defended the Cuban retreat with relentless commitment, securing every section of the terrain.

Unlikely to withstand the siege by the Spanish General, the Cubans decided on January 11, 1869, to abandon and carry out the Burning of Bayamo.

Gen. Mármol was frustrated with Carlos Manuel de Céspedes, whom he blamed for his defeat at El Salado. This resulted in Mármol's declaration as Dictator, but Francisco Vicente Aguilera stabilized things at a January 29, 1869 meeting in Tacajó. Mármol had returned to his area after the battles at El Salado.
