= Sinuosity =

Ratio of arc length and straight-line distance between two points on a wave-like function

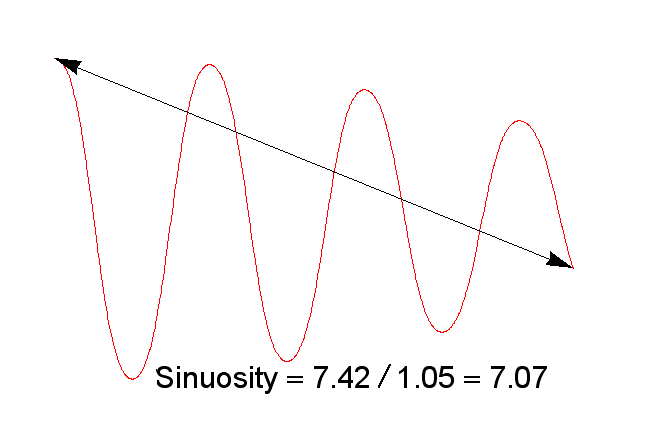
Calculation of sinuosity for an oscillating curve.

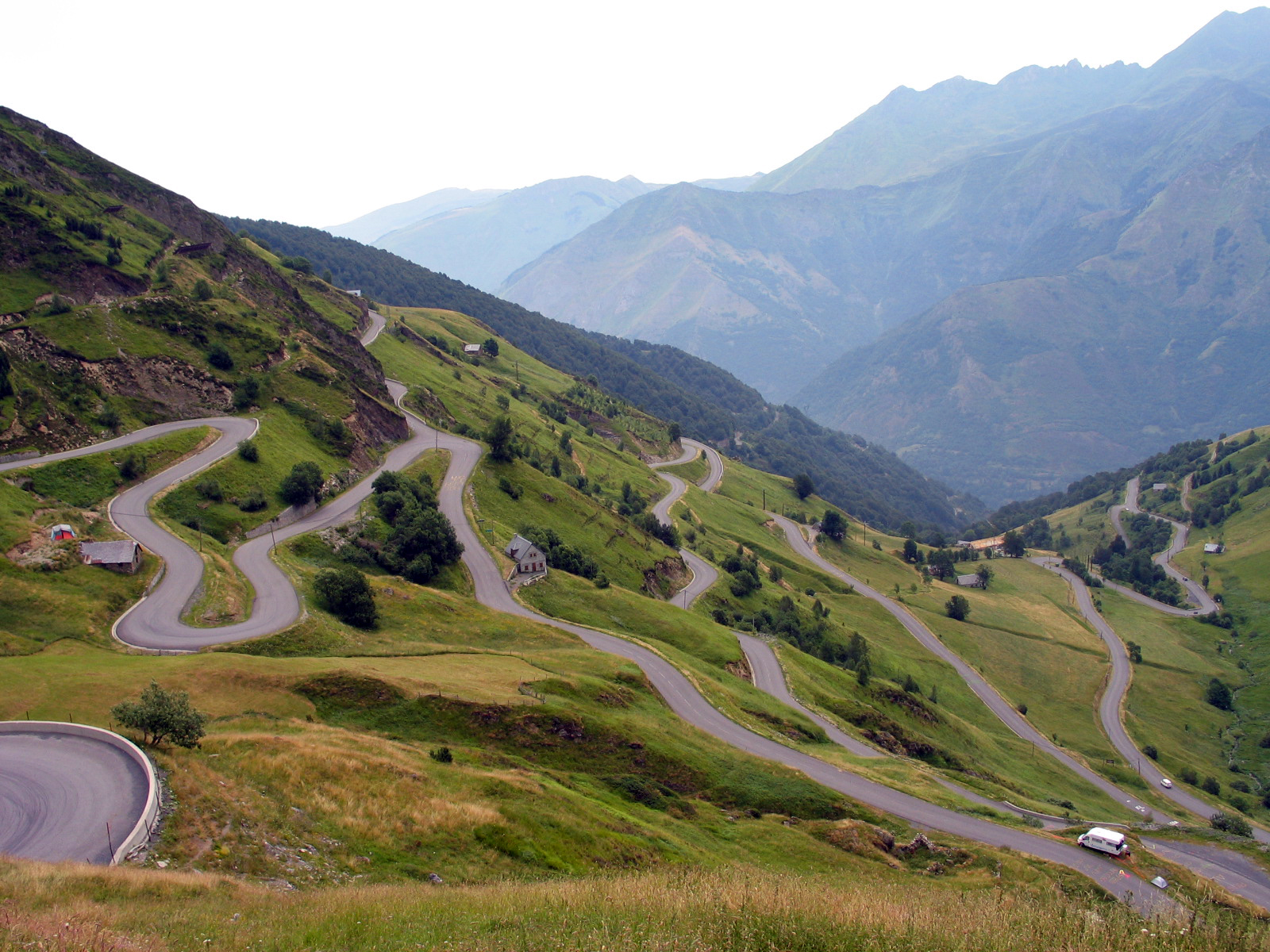
Switchbacks on mountain road with high sinuosity at Luz Ardiden

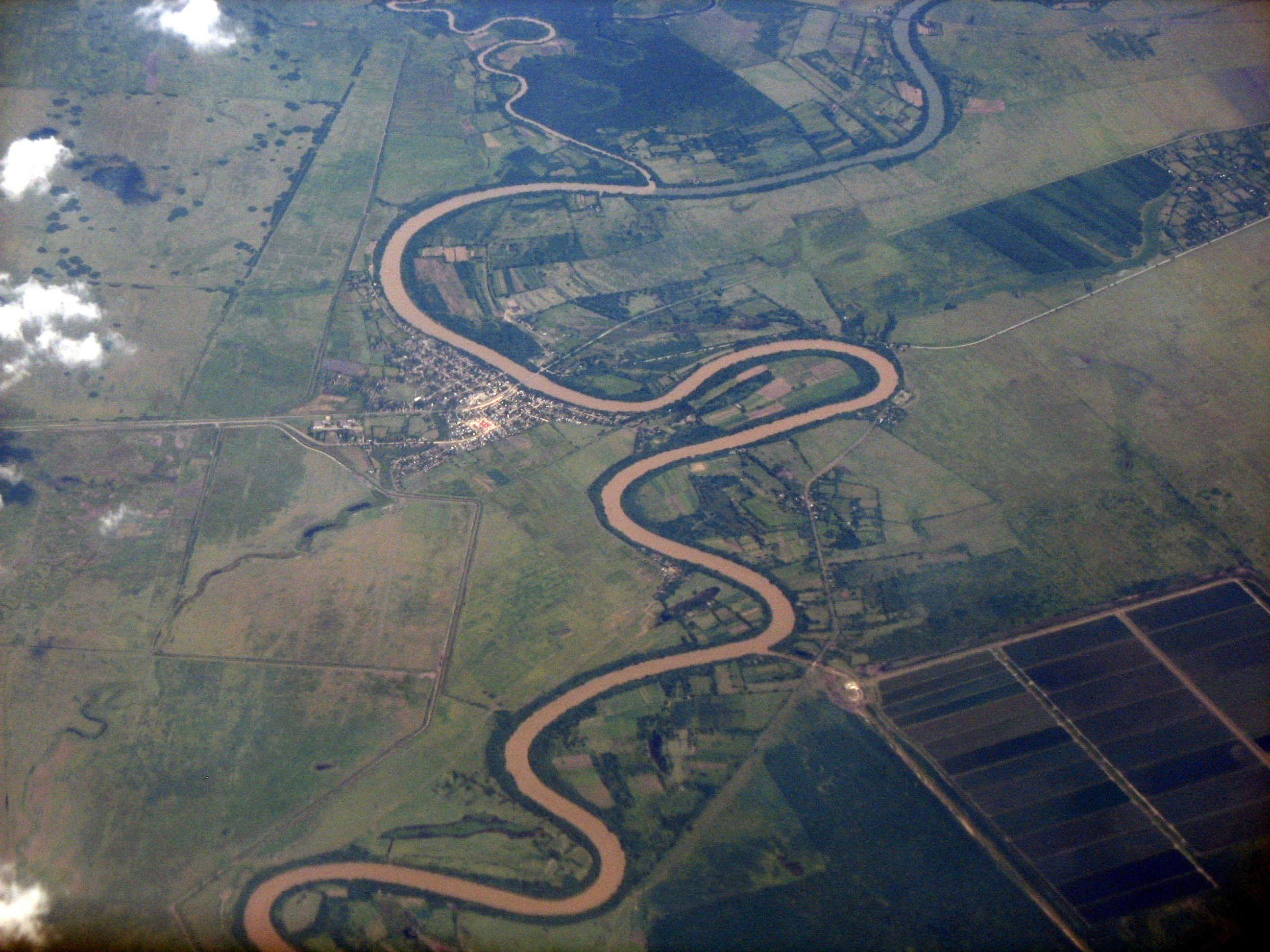
The meandering Rio Cauto at Guamo Embarcadero, Cuba, is not taking the shortest path downslope. Therefore, its sinuosity index is > 1.

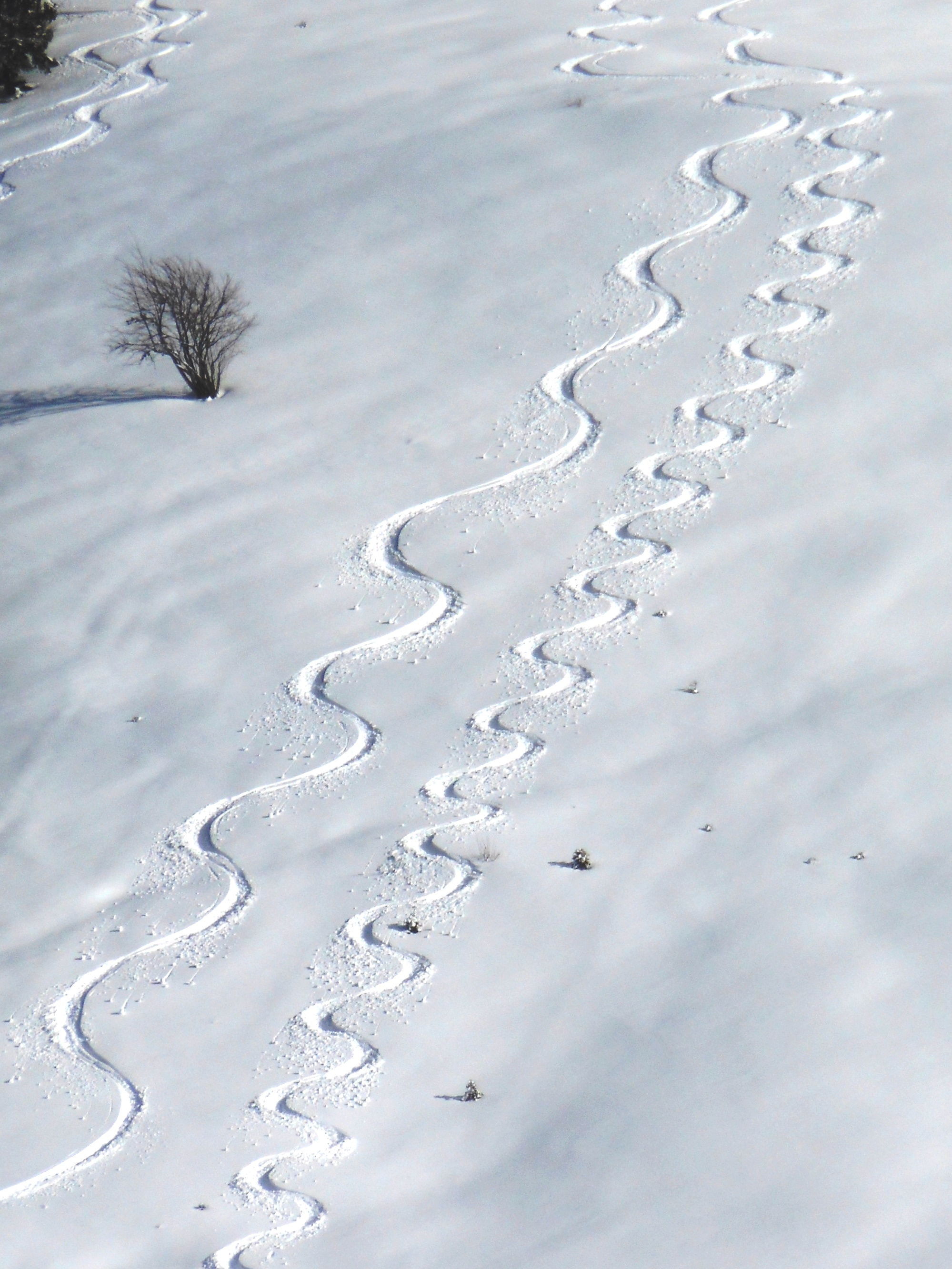
Two ski tracks with different degrees of sinuosity on the same slope

Sinuosity, sinuosity index, or sinuosity coefficient of a continuously differentiable curve having at least one inflection point is the ratio of the curvilinear length (along the curve) and the Euclidean distance (straight line) between the end points of the curve. This dimensionless quantity can also be rephrased as the "actual path length" divided by the "shortest path length" of a curve. The value ranges from 1 (case of straight line) to infinity (case of a closed loop, where the shortest path length is zero for an infinitely-long actual path).

== Interpretation ==
The curve must be continuous (no jump) between the two ends. The sinuosity value is really significant when the line is continuously differentiable (no angular point). The distance between both ends can also be evaluated by a plurality of segments according to a broken line passing through the successive inflection points (sinuosity of order 2).

The calculation of the sinuosity is valid in a 3-dimensional space (e.g. for the central axis of the small intestine), although it is often performed in a plane (with then a possible orthogonal projection of the curve in the selected plane; "classic" sinuosity on the horizontal plane, longitudinal profile sinuosity on the vertical plane).

The classification of a sinuosity (e.g. strong / weak) often depends on the cartographic scale of the curve (see the coastline paradox for further details) and of the object velocity which flowing therethrough (river, avalanche, car, bicycle, bobsleigh, skier, high speed train, etc.): the sinuosity of the same curved line could be considered very strong for a high speed train but low for a river. Nevertheless, it is possible to see a very strong sinuosity in the succession of few river bends, or of laces on some mountain roads.

== Notable values ==
The sinuosity S of:

- 2 inverted continuous semicircles located in the same plane is $S = \tfrac{\pi}{2} \approx 1.5708...$. It is independent of the circle radius;
- a sine function (over a whole number n of half-periods), which can be calculated by computing the sine curve's arclength on those periods, is $S = \textstyle \tfrac{1}{n\pi} \int_{0}^{n\pi} \sqrt{1 + (\cos x)^2} dx \approx 1.216...$

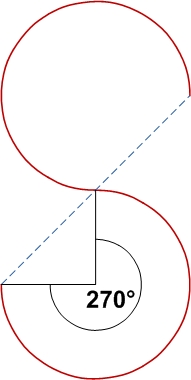
Example with 270° angle

With similar opposite arcs joints in the same plane, continuously differentiable:

Central angle		Sinuosity	
Degrees	Radians	Exact	Decimal
30°	$\frac{\pi}{6}$	$\frac{\pi}{3(\sqrt{6}-\sqrt{2})}$	1.0115
60°	$\frac{\pi}{3}$	$\frac{\pi}{3}$	1.0472
90°	$\frac{\pi}{2}$	$\frac{\pi}{2\sqrt{2}}$	1.1107
120°	$\frac{2\cdot\pi}{3}$	$\frac{2\cdot\pi}{3\sqrt{3}}$	1.2092
150°	$\frac{5\cdot\pi}{6}$	$\frac{5\cdot\pi}{3(\sqrt{6}+\sqrt{2})}$	1.3552
180°	$\pi$	$\frac{\pi}{2}$	1.5708
210°	$\frac{7\cdot\pi}{6}$	$\frac{7\cdot\pi}{3(\sqrt{6}+\sqrt{2})}$	1.8972
240°	$\frac{4\cdot\pi}{3}$	$\frac{4\cdot\pi}{3\sqrt{3}}$	2.4184
270°	$\frac{3\cdot\pi}{2}$	$\frac{3\cdot\pi}{2\sqrt{2}}$	3.3322
300°	$\frac{5\cdot\pi}{3}$	$\frac{5\cdot\pi}{3}$	5.2360
330°	$\frac{11\cdot\pi}{6}$	$\frac{11\cdot\pi}{3(\sqrt{6}-\sqrt{2})}$	11.1267

== Rivers ==
In studies of rivers, the sinuosity index is similar but not identical to the general form given above, being given by:

$$\text{SI} = \frac{{\text{channel length}}}{{\text{downvalley length}}}$$

The difference from the general form happens because the downvalley path is not perfectly straight. The sinuosity index can be explained, then, as the deviations from a path defined by the direction of maximum downslope. For this reason, bedrock streams that flow directly downslope have a sinuosity index of 1, and meandering streams have a sinuosity index that is greater than 1.

It is also possible to distinguish the case where the stream flowing on the line could not physically travel the distance between the ends: in some hydraulic studies, this leads to assign a sinuosity value of 1 for a torrent flowing over rocky bedrock along a horizontal rectilinear projection, even if the slope angle varies.

For rivers, the conventional classes of sinuosity, SI, are:

- SI <1.05: almost straight
- 1.05 ≤ SI <1.25: winding
- 1.25 ≤ SI <1.50: twisty
- 1.50 ≤ SI: meandering

It has been claimed that river shapes are governed by a self-organizing system that causes their average sinuosity (measured in terms of the source-to-mouth distance, not channel length) to be π, but this has not been borne out by later studies, which found an average value less than 2.

== See also ==
- Curvature
- Oxbow lake
