= Donato Mármol =

Cuban revolutionary and army general (1843–1870)

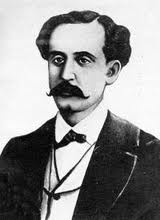
- Born: Donato Mármol y Tamayo; February 14, 1843; Bayamo, Oriente Province, Captaincy General of Cuba, Spanish Empire
- Died: June 26, 1870 (aged 27); Palma Soriano, Oriente Province, Captaincy General of Cuba, Spanish Empire
- Military career
- Allegiance: Cuba
- Branch: Cuban Liberation Army
- Service years: 1868–1870
- Rank: Major General
- Conflicts: Ten Years' War; Battle of Pino de Baire; Battle of El Salado

Donato Mármol (February 14, 1843 – June 26, 1870) was a Cuban revolutionary and general who played a key role in the Ten Years' War in Cuba.

== Early life ==
Donato Benjamín del Mármol y Tamayo was born in Bayamo, Spanish Cuba on February 14, 1843. His father, a Venezuelan native and captain in the Spanish Army, moved with his family to Santiago de Cuba, where Donato finished his education.

== Ten Years' War ==
Mármol was involved in early revolutionary meetings, including one led by Carlos Manuel de Céspedes in September 1868, where he acted as the leader of Jiguaní.

Donato Mármol and Calixto García met with friends nightly at Mármol's farm, near the town of Holguín. Within two days of Céspedes' Cry of Yara on October 10, 1868, they took up arms in the war of independence against Spain. The revolutionary uprising spread rapidly throughout Eastern Cuba.

Acting as the associate leader under Calixto García, Mármol led 150 men from town to town on October 13, 1868, driving the insurrection.

Once they attacked the towns of Santa Rita and Baire, they seized Jiguaní, capturing the governor in the process. By October 19, 1868, his forces captured Bayamo, which then became the location of the revolutionary government. Màrmol's men seized weapons from the Spanish troops in the Bayamo garrison.

=== Battle of Pino de Baire ===
On October 25, 1868, he engaged in the Battle of Pino de Baire in Baire, Oriente Province. He commanded a force of mambises with Gen. Maximo Gomez as his second-in-command against the Spanish troops of Col. Demetrio Quirós Weyler, who was sent to recapture Bayamo. Quirós was eventually forced to retreat to Santiago de Cuba. The early victory was reported on October 27, 1868, for the forces of Donato Mármol at Baire. The win earned him the support of Afro-Cuban troops and significantly enhanced the prestige of the Yara revolution. His command included nearly 4,000 poorly armed men, predominantly Black Cubans. Mármol recognized Antonio Maceo's leadership talent early on. In the opening skirmishes against Spanish soldiers, Maceo's extraordinary courage set him apart among Mármol's men.

Donato Mármol and Félix Figueredo attacked El Cobre in Santiago de Cuba in November 1868, though their effort failed. Shortly after, Gen. Mármol directed Figueredo to take control of the plaza, which had been deserted by the Spanish.

In December 1868, Donato Mármol led 300 men in a planned attack on Guantánamo, serving as second-in-command to Máximo Gómez. Mármol was tasked with advancing cautiously toward the town and holding position until Gómez's main force secured the surrounding area. When Spanish forces spotted Mármol's smaller column, they launched an assault with around 1,000 men. Despite being outnumbered, Mármol's troops held their ground in retreat, expecting reinforcements. Gómez's arrival turned the tide, and together they drove the Spaniards back to their entrenchments.

=== Battle of El Salado ===
Mármol's forces had been called from Santiago de Cuba to Bayamo in January 1869 to prevent Blas Villate, Count of Valmaseda's march on Bayamo. Ordered to take a strategic post at Cauto Embarcadero on the Bayamo bank of the Cauto River, 18 miles from the city, he was positioned to observe and prevent any enemy approach from Holguín, Tunas, or Manzanillo. Mármol's first line advanced on Blas Villate's position between the Salado and Cauto rivers, yet the steady and accurate Spanish artillery fire eventually forced Mármol's men to pull back. The Cuban defeat at the Battle of El Salado on January 7, 1869, led to the burning and abandonment of Bayamo by the Cubans. Donato Mármol, badly defeated, retreated with heavy losses. After what was seen as a military error, it became apparent that the general had received specific orders from Céspedes to carry out the action intended to block the Spanish troops from entering Bayamo. Revolutionary discord peaked with Mármol's self-proclamation as dictator, but Francisco Vicente Aguilera's intervention at a meeting in Tacajó on January 29, 1869, stabilized the movement.

In February 1869, his men clashed with Spanish forces under commander Quirós, who marched from Santiago de Cuba.

=== Cuban Liberation Party ===
Upon Céspedes's presidency in April 1869, Mármol was assigned as a general in the Manuel de Quesada-led Cuban Liberation Army. After Céspedes rectified certain positions, Mármol abandoned his confrontational stance, and strict military discipline was promptly restored.

Mármol led the 1st Brigade of Santiago de Cuba, part of the 2nd Division, Army of Oriente under Maj. Gen. Thomas Jordan. Command of the three brigades was held by Gen. Mármol, Gen. Luis Marcano, and Gen. Julio Grave de Peralta, in that order.

The Cuban general joined Gen. Jordan at Mayarí in Holguín in June 1869, bringing 1,500 men from the interior of Cuba. When Gen. Quesada arrived with 2,000 troops, he and Gen. Mármol integrated the entire Cuban contingent.

Donato Mármol was referred to as the Kilpatrick of the Cuban Army in August 1869.

Near Santiago de Cuba, in late March 1870, Gen. Marmol led around 1,000 men in an attack on the Las Chivas plantation, within a district pacified by Blas Villate. After capturing the engineer, he released him on the condition that he carry three letters to Santiago—addressed to F.W. Ramsden, Mrs. Ramsden, and Theodore Brooks.

Mármol engaged Brigadier D. Carlos Deteure near Santiago de Cuba at Ramanganaque around May 4, 1870, during which his men wounded both Deteure and the artillery captain, Francisco Herrera.

Stationed at the gates of Santiago de Cuba in late May 1870 under Vicente García González, Mármol coordinated with Máximo Gómez, who controlled the Iguani road. Blas Villate's forces, having lost 400 men and severed from Manzanillo, faced either a forced passage or surrender at discretion.

== Death ==
Donato Mármol died from cerebral fever on June 26, 1870, in the Baraguá camp and was buried at the San Felipe Estate near the Cauto River in Palma Soriano.

Following his death, Mármol's command in the Cuban Liberation Army was taken over by Gen. Máximo Gómez.
