= Cauto =

Cauto may refer to:

== Places ==
- Río Cauto:
  - Cauto River, the longest river in Cuba
  - Río Cauto, Cuba, a municipality in Granma Province, Cuba
- Cauto Cristo, Cuba, a municipality in Granma Province, Cuba

== Ship ==
- USS Cauto, a United States Navy cargo ship in commission from 1918 to 1919
