= List of rivers of Cuba =

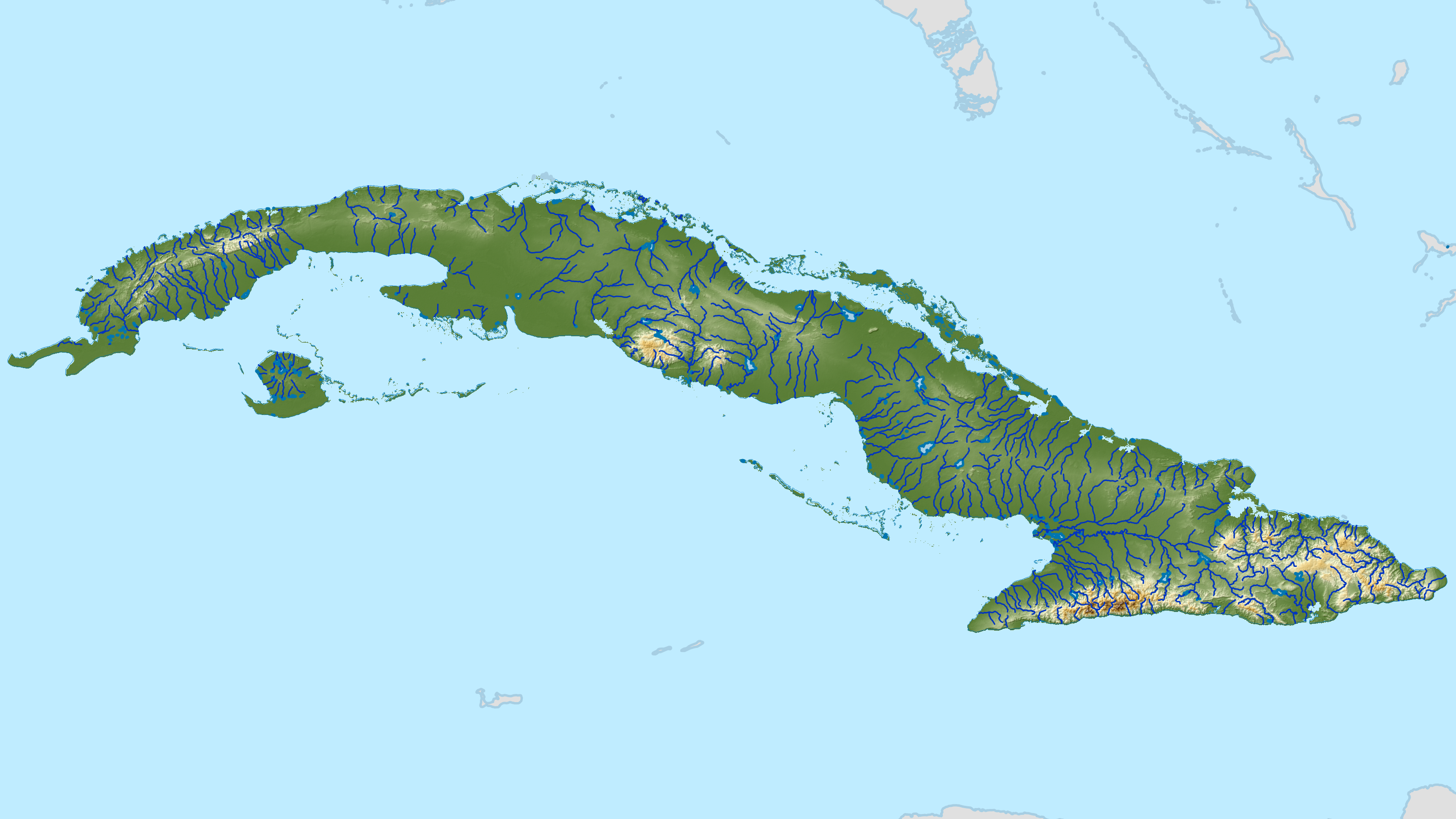
Rivers of Cuba

This is an incomplete list of rivers of Cuba, arranged from west to east, by coast, with respective tributaries indented under each larger stream's name.

== North Coast ==
- Mantua River
- Jaimanitas River
- Quibú River
- Almendares River
- Luyanó River
- Cojímar River
- Bacuranao River
- Tarará River
- Yumurí River
- Cormir River
- Río de la Palma
- Sagua la Grande River
- Sagua la Chica River
  - Camajuaní River
- Río Jatibonico del Norte
- Caonao River
- Máximo River
- Saramaguacán River
- Mayarí River
- Toa River
- Macaguanigua River

== South Coast ==
- Cuyaguateje River (Guane River)
- Guamá River
- San Diego River
- Ariguanabo River
- Mayabeque River
- Hanabana River (Amarillas River)
- Damují River (Rodas River)
- Agabama River (Manatí River)
- Arimao River
- Zaza River
- Río Jatibonico del Sur
- Jiquí River
- Tínima River
- San Pedro River
- Najasa River (San Juan de Najasa River)
- Tana River
- Sevilla River
- Jobabo River
- Cauto River
  - Salado River
  - Bayamo River
  - Contramaestre River
- Buey River
- Guantánamo River
- Jaibo River
- Guaso River
