= Río Cauto =

Rio Cauto can refer to:

- Cauto River, the longest river in Cuba
- Río Cauto, Cuba, a municipality and city in Granma Province, Cuba
