= Battle of Salado =

Battle of Salado may refer to:

- Battle of Río Salado or Battle of Tarifa (1340), a battle of the armies of King Afonso IV of Portugal and King Alfonso XI of Castile against those of sultan Abu al-Hasan 'Ali of Morocco and Yusuf I of Granada
- Battle of the Salado, a decisive engagement in 1842 that repulsed the final Mexican invasion of the Republic of Texas
- Battle of El Salado (1869), between Spanish and Cuban rebel forces during the Ten Years' War
