= Tana River =

Tana River may refer to:

- Tana River (Alaska), a river in Alaska, United States
- Tana River (Cuba), a river in southern Cuba
- Tana River (Kenya), the longest river in Kenya
  - Tana River County, a county in Kenya
  - Tana River Primate Reserve, a protected animal reserve in Kenya
- Tana River (Finland–Norway), a river on the border between Norway and Finland

== See also ==
- South of Tana River (1963), a Danish movie
