= Bayamo River =

Cuban river

Coordinates: 20.36187°N 76.64506°W

Bayamo River is a river of southern Cuba. It is a tributary of the Cauto River.

== See also ==
- List of rivers of Cuba
