= Contramaestre River =

River in Cuba

Contramaestre River is a river of southern Cuba. It is a tributary of the Cauto River.

== See also ==
- List of rivers of Cuba
