= Cosme Proenza =

- Born: Cosme Proenza Almaguer; 5 March 1948; Tacajó, Báguanos, Holguín Province, Cuba
- Died: 12 September 2022 (aged 74); Holguín, Cuba
- Education: Escuela Nacional de Arte, Havana; Institute of Fine Arts, Kyiv
- Known for: Painting, muralism, illustration
- Notable work: Los Dioses Escuchan*; *Parque de los Tiempos*
- Movement: Contemporary Cuban art
- Awards: Distinción por la Cultura Nacional (1998); Medalla Alejo Carpentier (2002)

Cosme Proenza Almaguer (5 March 1948 – 12 September 2022) was a Cuban painter, muralist, and illustrator, known for combining European art traditions with Caribbean and Cuban imagery in a distinctive, symbolist style.

== Early life and education ==
Proenza was born in Tacajó, Báguanos, in the province of Holguín, Cuba. He studied at the Escuela Nacional de Arte (National School of Art) in Havana and later earned a Master of Fine Arts degree at the Institute of Fine Arts in Kyiv, Ukraine.

He became a member of the Unión Nacional de Escritores y Artistas de Cuba (UNEAC) and of the International Association of Plastic Arts (AIAP), and taught for fifteen years, supervising numerous theses.

== Career ==
Proenza began exhibiting in the 1970s, presenting both drawings and paintings. His early solo shows included Dibujos y Pinturas at Galería Holguín (1978) and Pinturas Cubanas at the Institute of Civil Aviation in Kyiv (1983).

He participated in national and international exhibitions and developed series such as Manipulaciones, Boscomanías, and Los Dioses Escuchan, exploring reinterpretations of classical iconography.

In 2011, the exhibition Paralelos. Cosme Proenza: historia y tradición del arte occidental opened in Holguín with 114 works marking his forty-year career. Among his public works are the fresco Juventud (1986, Motel El Bosque, Holguín) and Celia, la flor más autóctona (2001, Escuela de Trabajadores Sociales, Holguín).

He also designed and oversaw Parque de los Tiempos, inaugurated in 2016 in Holguín, which translated his visual universe into sculptural and architectural forms.

== Artistic style ==
Critics described Proenza’s work as a fusion of Renaissance, Baroque, and medieval European influences with Cuban color, symbolism, and mythology. His visual language often drew from Western art history but adapted it to tropical and spiritual contexts.

The artist himself referred to this combination as a “tropical Middle Ages” (Medioevo Tropical), a metaphor for his reinterpretation of historical imagery through a Caribbean lens.

== Recognition ==
Proenza received multiple distinctions, including the Distinción por la Cultura Nacional (1998), the Hacha de Holguín (2000), and the Medalla Alejo Carpentier (2002). His works are part of collections in Cuba and abroad, including the Museo Nacional de Bellas Artes in Havana and the Vatican Museums in Rome.

Cosme Proenza died on 12 September 2022 at the Hospital Vladimir Ilich Lenin in Holguín. His passing was widely covered in Cuban media, which highlighted his role as a major representative of Holguín’s cultural identity.
