= Jaibo River =

River in Guantánamo, Cuba

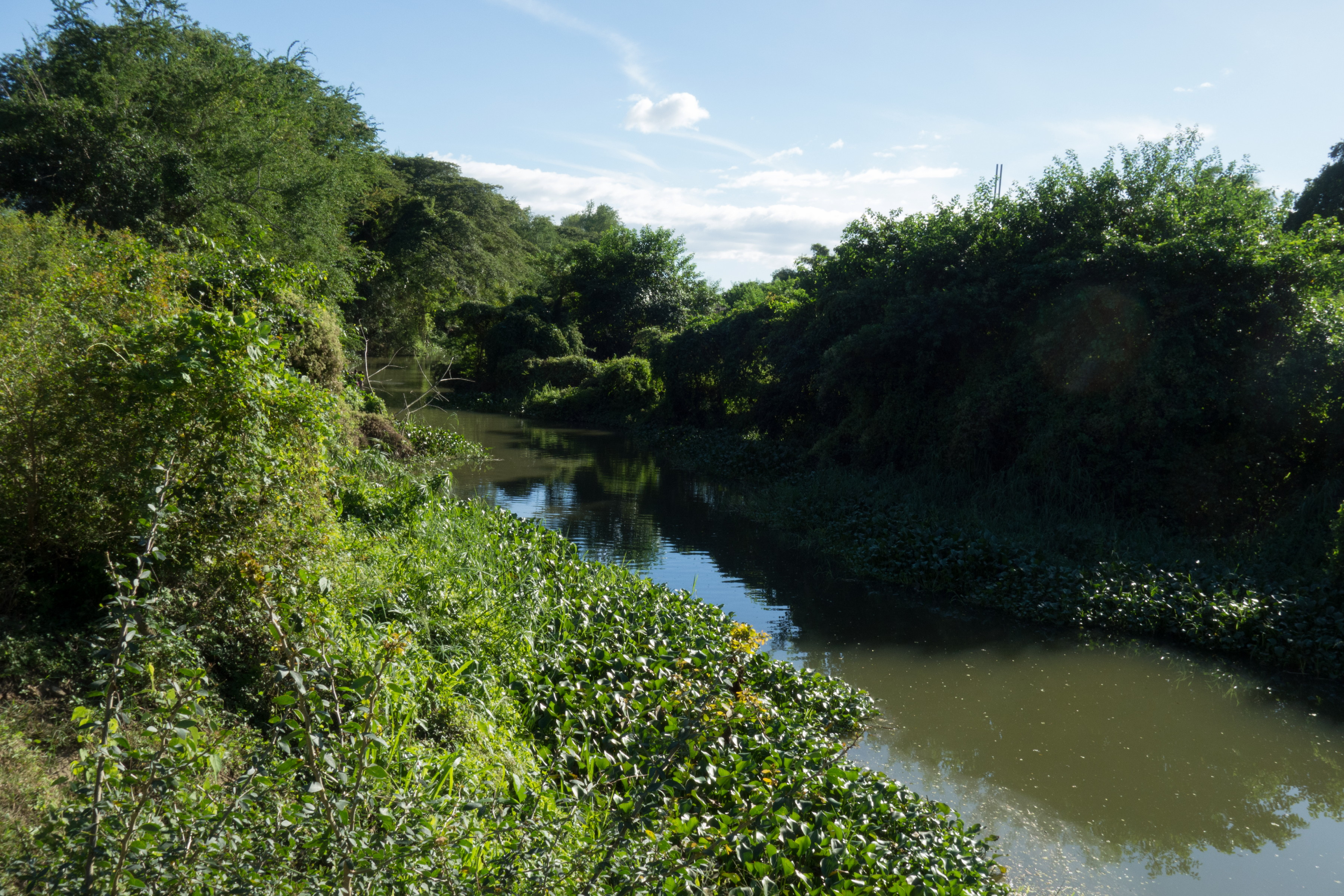
River Jaibo, Guanánamo city, Cuba

The Jaibo River is a river of southern Cuba.

== See also ==
- List of rivers of Cuba
