= Battle of Pino de Baire =

1868 battle of the Ten Years' War

- Part of the Ten Years' War
- Battle of Pino de Baire (Cuba)
Date	25 October 1868
Location	Baire, Oriente Province, Captaincy General of Cuba
Result	Cuban victory

Belligerents
Ejército Mambí	Spain

Commanders and leaders
Donato Mármol; Sergeant Máximo Gómez	Colonel Demetrio Quirós Weyler

Strength
1,100	700 men

Casualties and losses
Unknown	233 casualties

The Battle of Pino de Baire, also known as the Primera Carga al Machete (English: First Machete Charge), occurred on 25 October 1868 during the beginning of the Ten Years' War. It was the first instance of the reputable machete charge in the war that became a common mambí tactic.

== The events ==
A Spanish column of more than 700 men commanded by Colonel Demetrio Quirós Weyler was en route to Bayamo from Manzanillo or Santiago de Cuba to recapture the city from Carlos Manuel de Céspedes when ambushed by Máximo Gómez's forces, who were under the command of Donato Mármol, at Baire, near Contramaestre.

The column was armed with swords and bayonets while the mambises carried mostly machetes, pitchforks, and other farming tools. Due to the superior quality of Spanish equipment, Gómez decided to engage in close combat with machetes, a weapon he was familiar with from his service in the Dominican Republic.

The battle was disastrous for the Spanish column, who disorderly retreated after suffering numerous casualties. The column retreated to Santiago de Cuba with nearly one third of the men lost. In this retreat the force left behind firearms, ammunition, and a train of artillery. The mambises were left with a few men injured.

== Film depiction ==
The battle was depicted in the 1969 black and white film La primera carga al machete directed by Manuel Octavio Gómez.

== Bibliography ==
- “La primera carga al machete, de Manuel Octavio Gómez: Cine, mito y revolución” Artículo de Santiago Juan-Navarro publicado en Cinéma et Révolution cubaine. Eds. Julie Amiot and Nancy Berthier. Lyon: Université Lyon 2 – GRIMH, 2006. 105–113.
- Murguía, Salvador Jimenez; O'Reilly, Sean; McMenamin, Amanda (15 January 2020). A Cuban Cinema Companion. Rowman & Littlefield. ISBN 978-1-5381-0774-4.
- Navarro García, Luis (1998). Las guerras de España en Cuba. Madrid: Ediciones Encuentro. ISBN 8474904749.
- Walker, Jeanie Mort (1875). Life of Capt. Joseph Fry, the Cuban martyr. Being a faithful record of his remarkable career from childhood to the time of his heroic death at the hands of Spanish executioners; recounting his experience as an officer in the U. S. and Confederate navies, and revealing much of the inner history and secret marine service of the late Civil War in America. Hartford, J. B. Burr.
