= Caonao River =

Location
- Country: Cuba

Caonao River is a river of northern Cuba.

== See also ==
- List of rivers of Cuba
