= Saramaguacán River =

River in Cuba

Saramaguacán River is a river of northern Cuba.

== See also ==
- List of rivers of Cuba
