= Luis Marcano =

Dominican general of the pre-independence Cuban Army (1831–1870)

Luis Marcano Álvarez
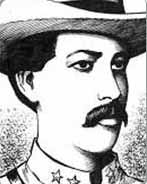
- Born: November 29, 1831; Baní, Dominican Republic
- Died: May 16, 1870 (aged 38); Manzanillo, Cuba
- Military career
- Allegiance: Dominican Republic (1840s and 1850s); Spain (1861–1865); Cuba (1868–1870)
- Branch: Army
- Rank: Major General
- Conflicts: Dominican War of Independence; Dominican Restoration War; Ten Years' War

Luis Marcano (September 29, 1831 – May 16, 1870) was a Dominican Republic general of the pre-independence Cuban Army during the Ten Years' War.

== Biography ==
Luis Jerónimo Marcano Álvarez was born in Baní, Dominican Republic in 1831, and he served in the militias which repelled the Haitian invasions of the 1840s and 1850s; he rose to the rank of Lieutenant-Colonel. He later served in the Spanish Army during the Dominican Restoration War, and, after the Dominicans won the war, Marcano and his two brothers fled to Spanish Cuba.

However, they joined the Cuban rebels during the Ten Years' War, and Marcano became a Major-General in the Cuban Army. He took part in the 1868 capture of Bayamo and the 1869 Battle of El Sallado.

On 16 May 1870, after an attack on the Congo camp, south of Manzanillo, he was fatally shot in the groin by an unknown assassin, apparently a member of his own troops hidden in the undergrowth.
