= Guaso River =

River in Guantánamo province, Cuba

Guaso River is a river of southern Cuba. It is the main river of Guantánamo city.

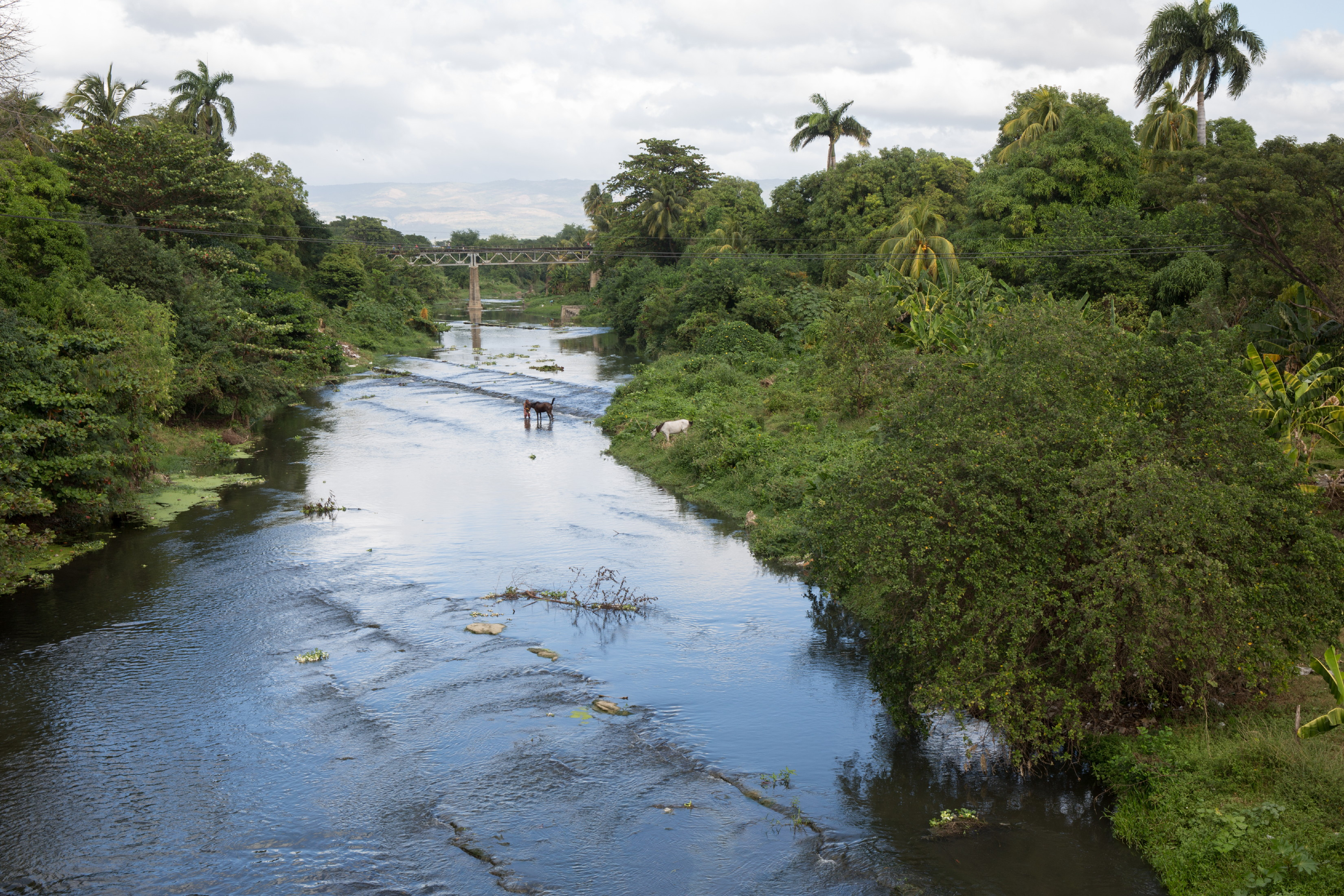
Guaso river in the city of Guantánamo

== See also ==
- List of rivers of Cuba
