= Máximo River =

River in Cuba

The Máximo River or Rio Máximo is a river of northern Cuba.

Flamingo can be found along the river.

== See also ==
- List of rivers of Cuba
