= Najasa River =

Coordinates: 21.11194°N 77.78957°W

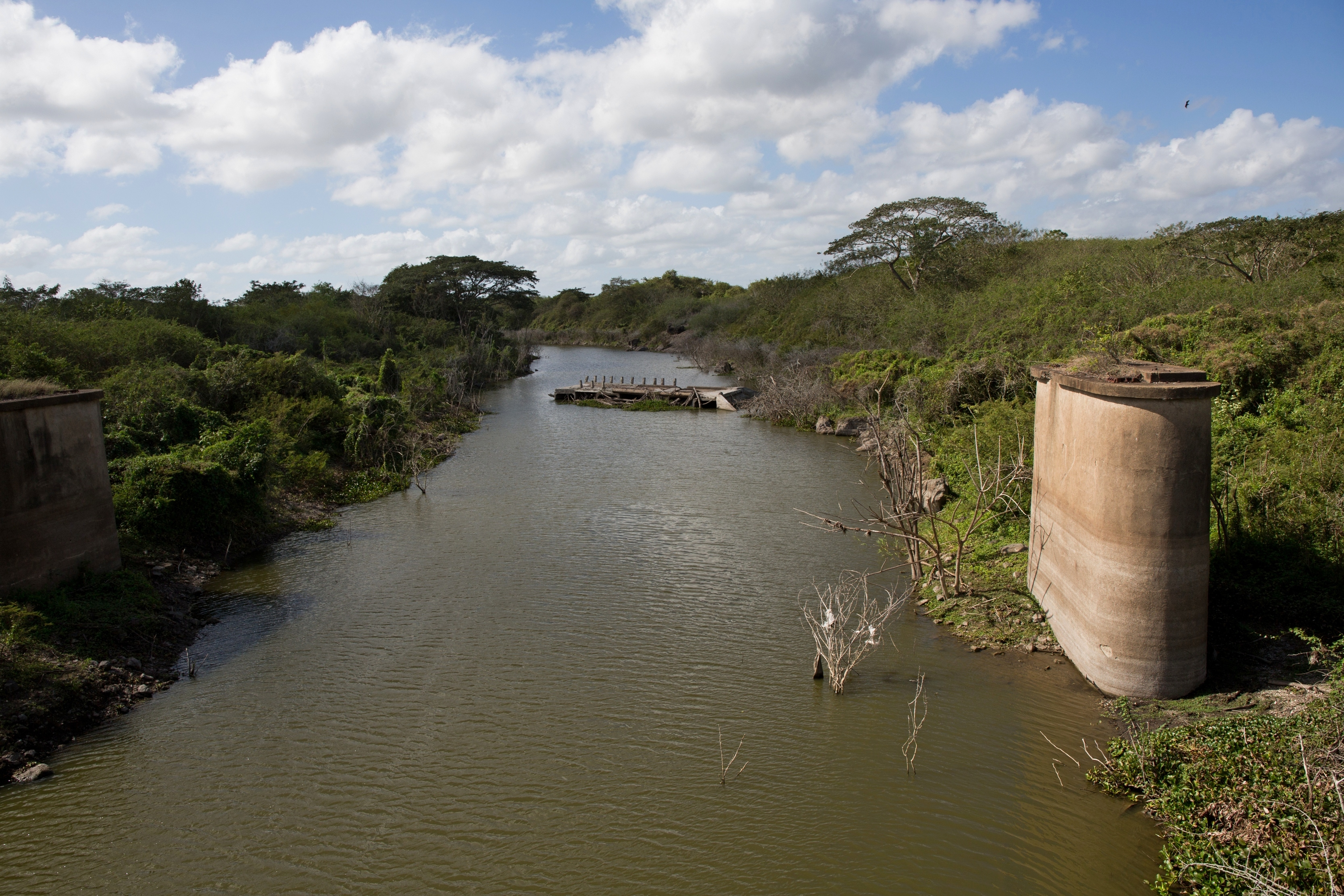
Najasa river near the village of the same name

Najasa River is a river of southern Cuba.

== See also ==
- List of rivers of Cuba
