= Demetrio Quirós Weyler =

Spanish army general

- Born: Demetrio Quirós y Weyler
- Relatives: Valeriano Weyler
- Military career
- Branch: Spanish Army
- Rank: Colonel
- Conflicts: Ten Years' War; Battle of Pino de Baire

Demetrio Quirós Weyler was a Spanish military officer notable for his service during the Ten Years' War in Cuba, where he later served as the governor of Matanzas.

== Early life ==
Demetrio Quirós y Weyler was born in the 19th century in Spain. His cousin was Spanish General Valeriano Weyler.

Demetrio Quirós Weyler graduated from the Infantry School of Toledo in the mid-1850s after deciding to join the Spanish Army.

In 1856 he served as Second Commander in the 35th Infantry Regiment of Toledo's Second Battalion. On 1 August 1856 he was appointed Lieutenant colonel.

By 1866 he was transferred to the island of Cuba where he led the 7th Infantry Regiment of Cuba (Spanish: Regimiento de Cuba, Número 7).

== Ten Years' War ==
He served as a colonel during Cuba's Ten Years' War that began in October 1868. After the uprising, Quirós was dispatched to recapture Bayamo.

=== Battle of Baire ===
On 25 October 1868 he was involved in the Battle of Pino de Baire in the eastern province of Oriente. A 700-soldier force under his command was attacked by the mambises of Gen. Donato Mármol and Maximo Gomez. In the face of mounting challenges, Quirós was eventually compelled to retreat to Santiago de Cuba, where he regrouped.

In 1872 Quirós led the 4th Infantry Regiment of Nápoles.

On 5 May 1873 he was appointed Military Governor of Matanzas in Cuba, succeeding Juan Nepomuceno Burriel.
