= Mantua River =

- Location of mouth
- Native name: Río Mantua (Spanish)

Location
- Country: Cuba
- Province: Pinar del Río

Physical characteristics
- Mouth
  - location: Guadiana Bay
  - coordinates: 22°08′18″N 84°22′08″W

The Mantua River is a river in northern Cuba.

== See also ==
- List of rivers of Cuba
