= Guamá River (Cuba) =

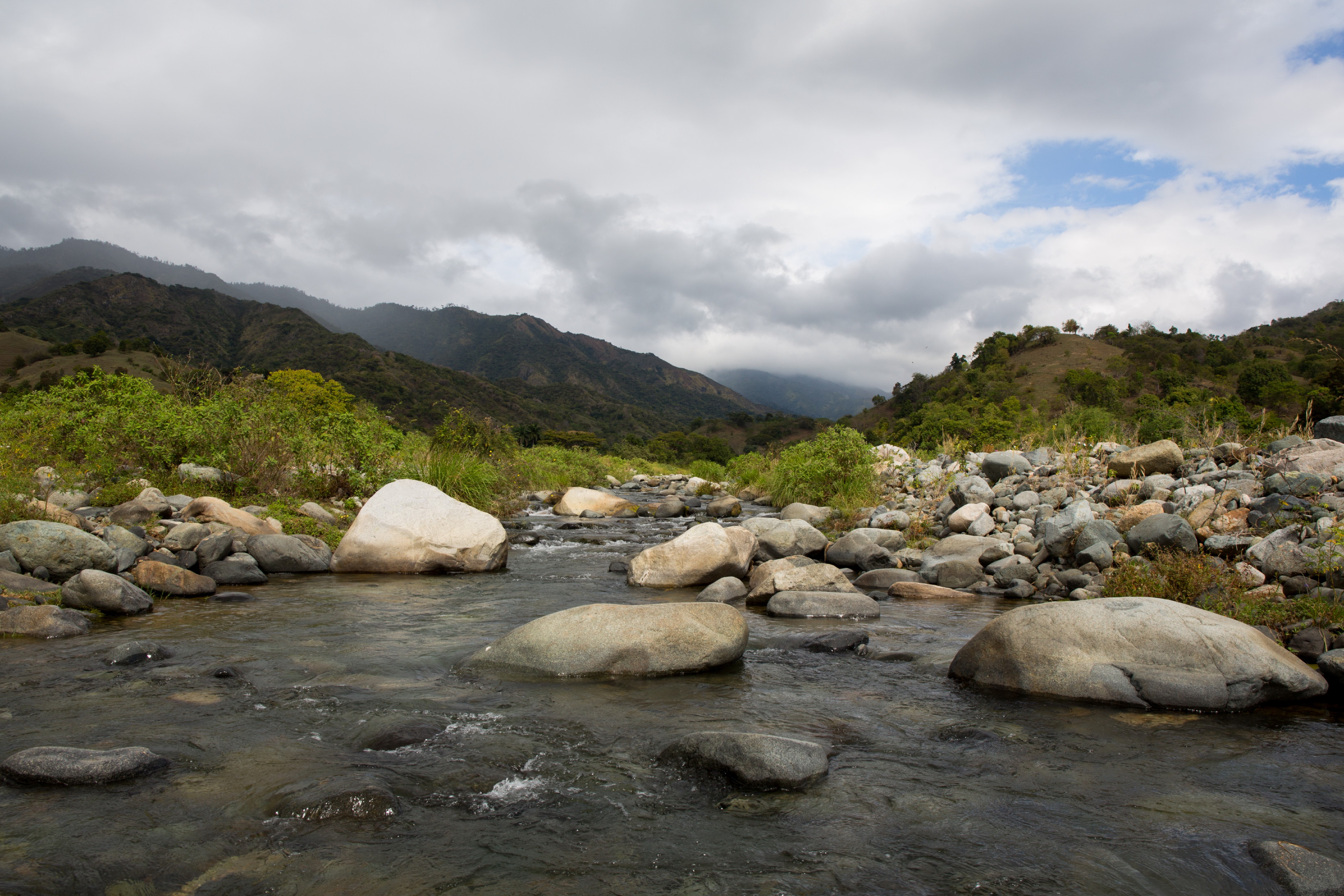

Location
- Country: Cuba
- Region: Sierra Maestra

Physical characteristics
- Source
  - elevation: 960 m (3,150 ft)
- Length: 82 km (51 mi)

Guamá River is a river of southern Cuba.

== See also ==
- List of rivers of Cuba
