= Jiquí River =

The Jiquí is a seasonal river in central Cuba. In Cuba it is known as Rio Jiquí.

== See also ==
- List of rivers of Cuba
