= Jobabo River =

River in Cuba

Jobabo River is a river of southern Cuba.

== See also ==
- List of rivers of Cuba
