= Tana River (Cuba) =

Location
- Country: Cuba
- Province: Las Tunas
- Municipality: Colombia

Tana River is a river of southern Cuba. It flows through the municipality of Colombia in the province of Las Tunas.

== See also ==
- List of rivers of Cuba
