= Jatibonico del Sur River =

Jatibonico del Sur
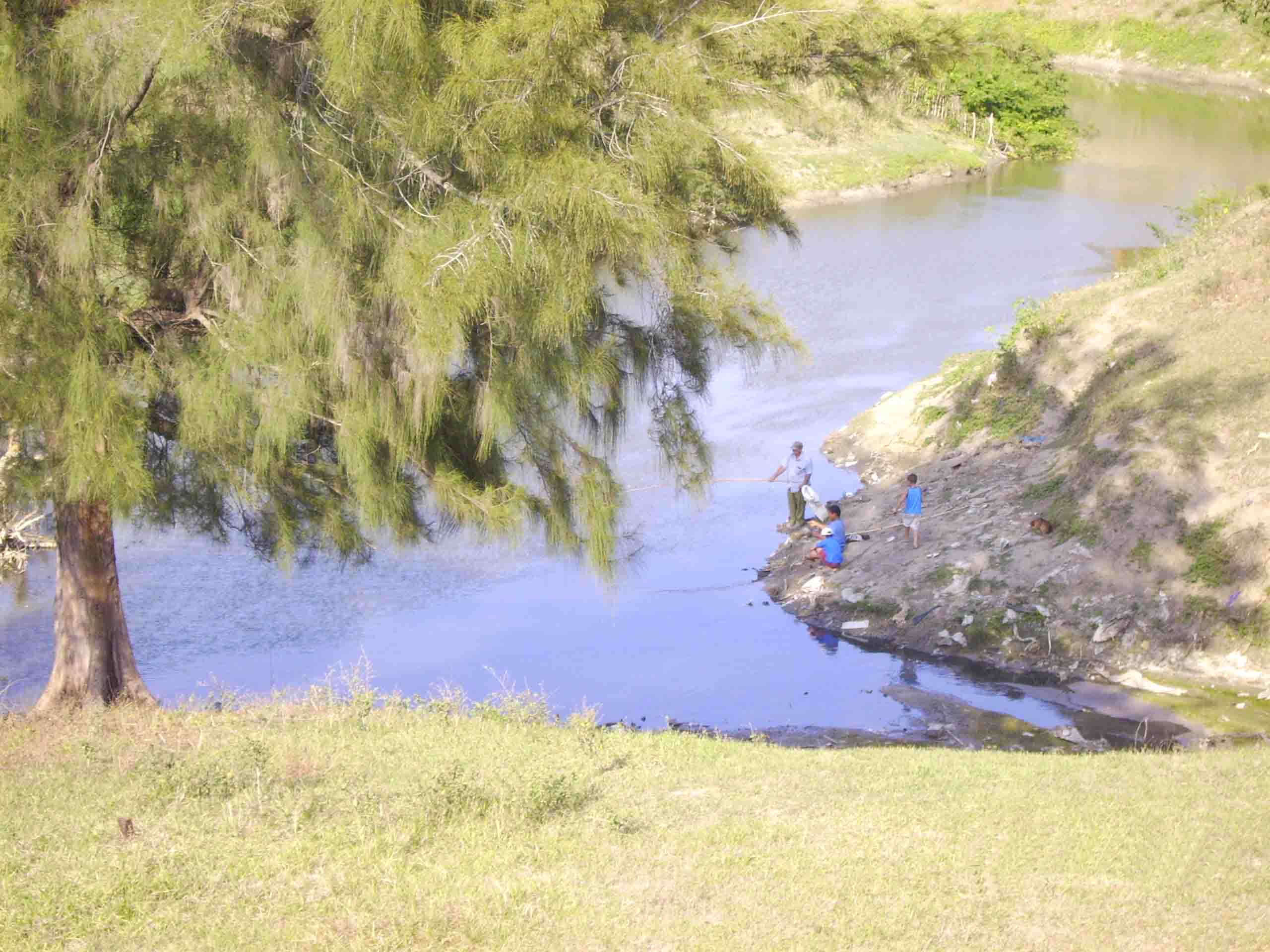
- Fishermen at the Jatibonico del Sur

- Location of mouth

Location
- Country: Cuba

Physical characteristics
- Source: Santa Clara
  - coordinates: 22°13′N 79°14′W
  - elevation: 220 m (720 ft)
- Mouth: Atlantic Ocean
  - location: Jatibonico
  - coordinates: 21°33′N 79°09′W
  - elevation: 0 m (0 ft) (Sea level)
- Length: 119.5 km (74.3 mi)
- Discharge
  - average: 8.48 m^{3}/s (299 cu ft/s)

Río Jatibonico del Sur is a river of southern Cuba.

The river's source is located approximately 1 kilometre south of the town Iguará at 220 metres elevation. The water then splits into two streams, running down from the heights of the municipality of Santa Clara . The southern one is Río Jatibonico del Sur, while the northern one is Río Jatibonico del Norte. The river's mouth is located at the tip of Jatibonico in a low and marshy area, about 15 kilometers south of the town El Jíbaro. The river has a total length of 119.5 kilometres, constituting the border between the municipalities of Taguasco and Jatibonico, as well as the latter and La Sierpe.

The water of the river is used for agriculture, especially rice plantations.

== See also ==
- List of rivers of Cuba
