= Salado River (Cuba) =

River in Cuba

Salado River is a river of southern Cuba. It is a tributary of the Cauto River.

== See also ==
- List of rivers of Cuba
