= Río de la Palma =

- Location of mouth

Location
- Country: Cuba

Physical characteristics
- Mouth
  - coordinates: 23°03′N 80°54′W

Río de la Palma is a river of northern Cuba.

== See also ==
- List of rivers of Cuba
