= Hanabana River =

River in Cuba

Hanabana River is a river of southern Cuba.

== See also ==
- List of rivers of Cuba
