= Guamo Embarcadero =

Guamo Embarcadero Guamo
- Village
- Location of Guamo Embarcadero in Cuba
- Coordinates: 20°36′59″N 76°57′32″W
- Country: Cuba
- Province: Granma
- Municipality: Río Cauto

Area
  - Total: 0.8292 km^{2} (0.3202 sq mi)
- Elevation: 10 m (33 ft)

Population (2012)
  - Total: 3,840
  - Density: 4,631/km^{2} (11,990/sq mi)
- Time zone: UTC-5 (EST)

Guamo Embarcadero, simply known as Guamo, is a Cuban village and consejo popular ("people's council", i.e. hamlet) of the municipality of Río Cauto, in Granma Province of Cuba. It is 45 kilometres (28 mi) northwest of Bayamo, the provincial capital.

== History ==
The rural village of Guamo, situated on Cuba's longest river, the Cauto River, was originally part of the township or municipal district of Bayamo in Oriente Province in Cuba.

Following the 1976 Cuban constitutional referendum, Guamo Embarcadero became part of the Cuban municipality of Río Cauto in Granma Province.

== Demographics ==
In 2012, the settlement of Guamo Embarcadero had a population of 3,840.

== See also ==
- List of cities in Cuba
