= José María Rodríguez Rodríguez =

Cuban military man

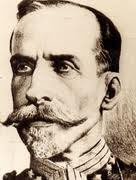
Portrait of José María Rodríguez Rodríguez

José María Rodríguez Rodríguez, also known as Mayia (June 13, 1849 - May 25, 1903), was a Cuban military man who served in the Ten Years War.
