= Colombia, Cuba =

Colombia Central Elia
- Municipality
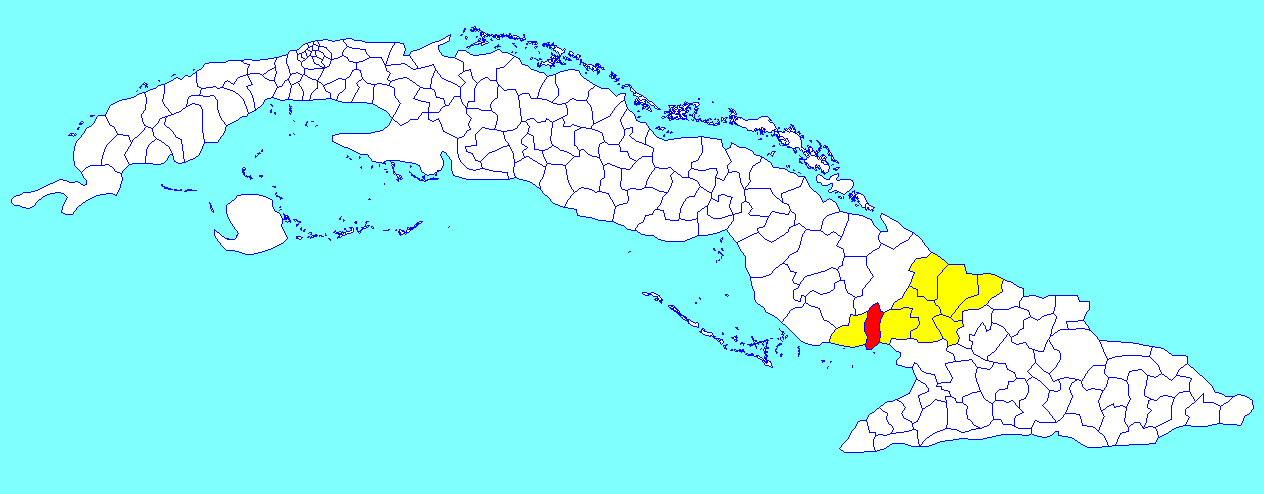
- Colombia municipality (red) within Las Tunas Province (yellow) and Cuba
- Coordinates: 20°59′26″N 77°24′57″W
- Country: Cuba
- Province: Las Tunas

Area
  - Total: 563 km^{2} (217 sq mi)
- Elevation: 65 m (213 ft)

Population (2022)
  - Total: 31,482
  - Density: 55.9/km^{2} (145/sq mi)
- Time zone: UTC-5 (EST)
- Postal code: 77600
- Area code: +53-31
- Website: https://www.colombia.gob.cu/

Colombia is a municipality and town in the Las Tunas Province of Cuba. It is located in the western part of the province, 10 kilometres (6.2 mi) south of Guáimaro. Río Tana flows through the community.

== Demographics ==
In 2022, the municipality of Colombia had a population of 31,482. With a total area of 563 km^{2} (217 sq mi), it has a population density of 56/km^{2} (150/sq mi).

== See also ==
- Municipalities of Cuba
- List of cities in Cuba
