= Arimao River =

River in Cuba

- Arimao River
- Rio Arimao (Spanish)
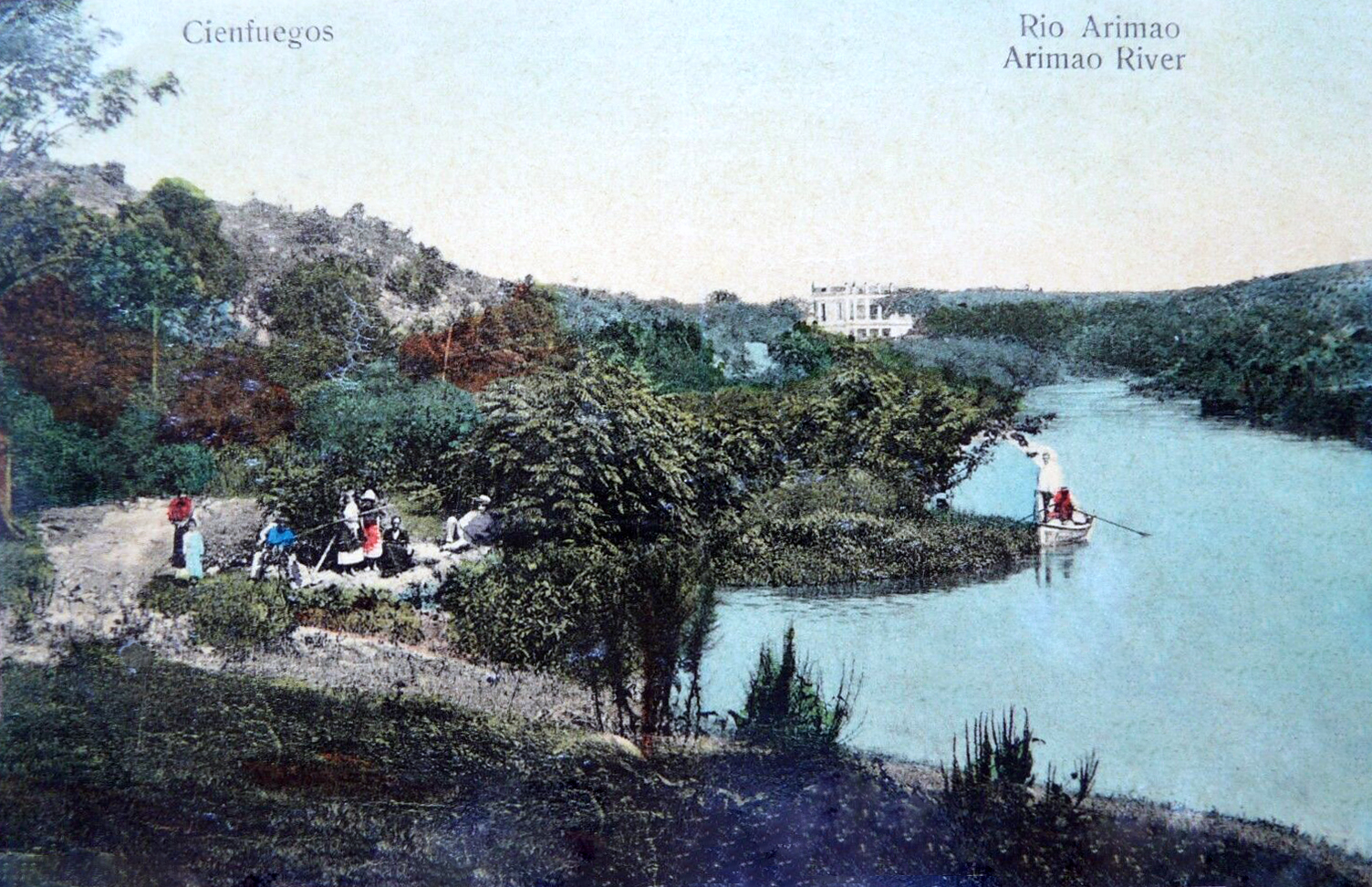
- Arimao River c. 1915

- Location in Cuba
- Coordinates: 22°01′38″N 80°24′09″W / 22.02722°N 80.4025°W
- Ocean/sea sources: Caribbean Sea
- Basin countries: Cuba
- Max. length: 82.6 kilometres (51.3 mi)
- Settlements: Cienfuegos, Cuba; Jagua

The Arimao River (22.02722°N 80.4025°W) is a river in Cuba that runs 82.6 km from the center of the island.

== Description ==
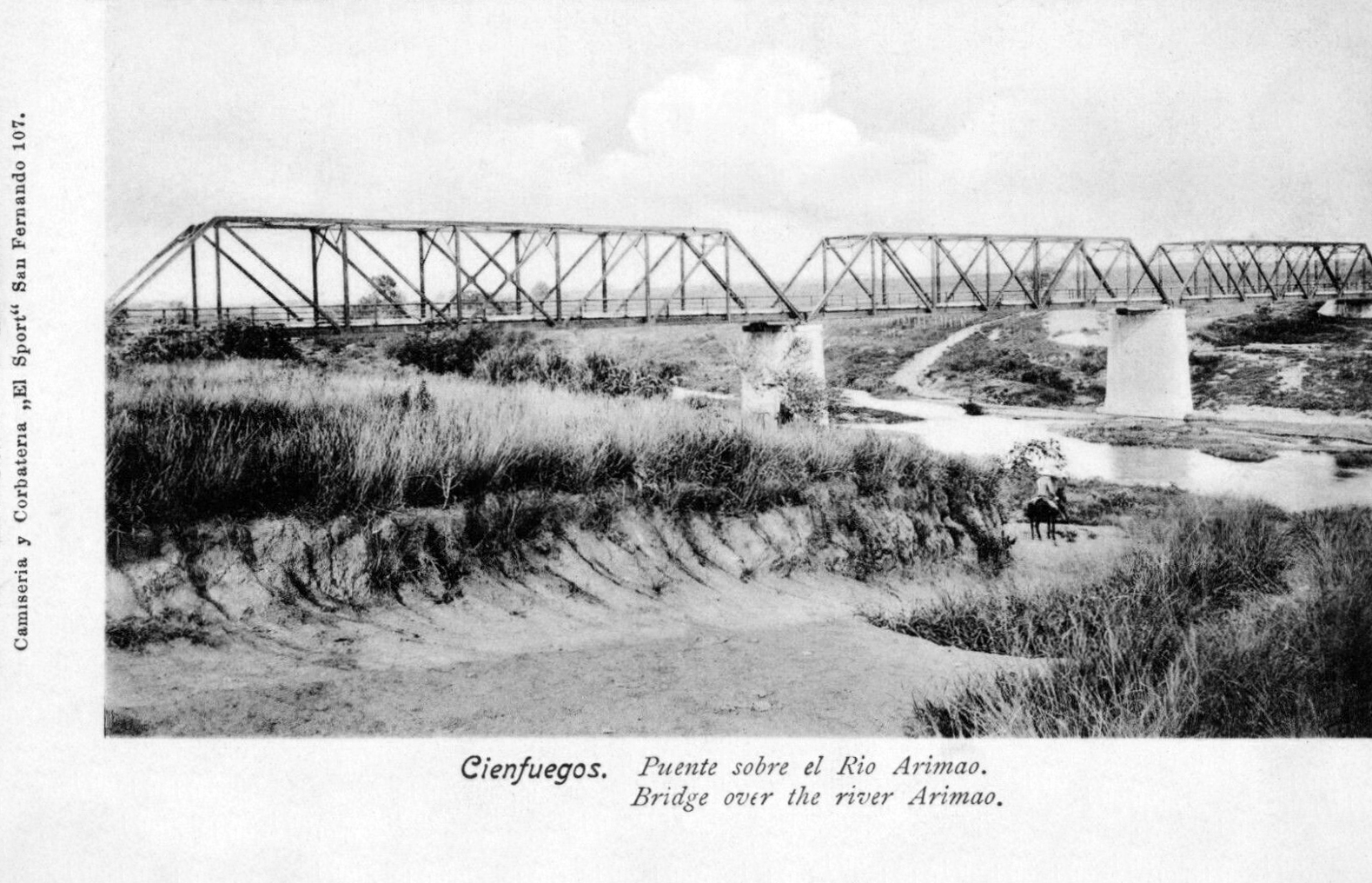
Bridge over the Arimao River c. 1903

The Arimao River originates in the foothills of the Sierra del Escambray, east of Cienfuegos Province and flows in a very winding course to the southwest, flowing into the Cienfuegos Bay. Its watershed covers approximately 994.5 km², and has 9 tributaries.

The Arimao River Basin has been the focus of environmental groups.
