= Geometrical continuity =

The concept of geometrical continuity was primarily applied to the conic sections (and related shapes) by mathematicians such as Leibniz, Kepler, and Poncelet. The concept was an early attempt at describing, through geometry rather than algebra, the concept of continuity as expressed through a parametric function.

The basic idea behind geometrical continuity was that the five conic sections were really five different versions of the same shape. An ellipse tends to a circle as the eccentricity approaches zero, or to a parabola as it approaches one; and a hyperbola tends to a parabola as the eccentricity drops toward one; it can also tend to intersecting lines. Thus, there was continuity between the conic sections. These ideas led to other concepts of continuity. For instance, if a circle and a straight line were two expressions of the same shape, perhaps a line could be thought of as a circle of infinite radius. For such to be the case, one would have to make the line closed by allowing the point $x =\infty$ to be a point on the circle, and for $x =+\infty$ and $x =-\infty$ to be identical. Such ideas were useful in crafting the modern, algebraically defined, idea of the continuity of a function and of $\infty$ (see projectively extended real line for more).
