= Jatibonico del Norte River =

River in Cuba

Coordinates: 22°23′N 78°56′W

Río Jatibonico del Norte is a river of northern Cuba.

== See also ==
- List of rivers of Cuba
