= Báguanos =

Town in Cuba

Báguanos Báguano
- Municipality
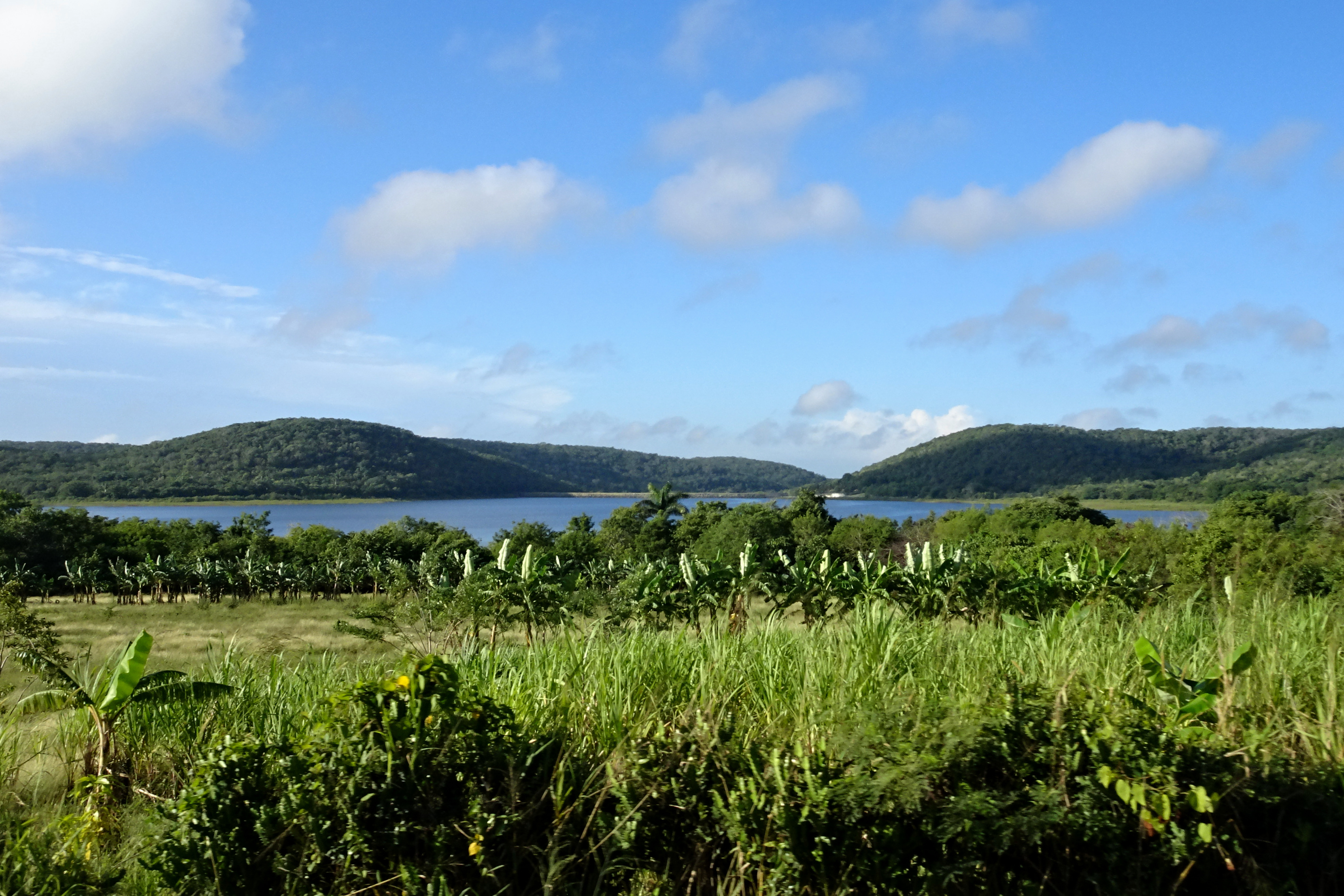
- Camazán Reservoir, Báguanos

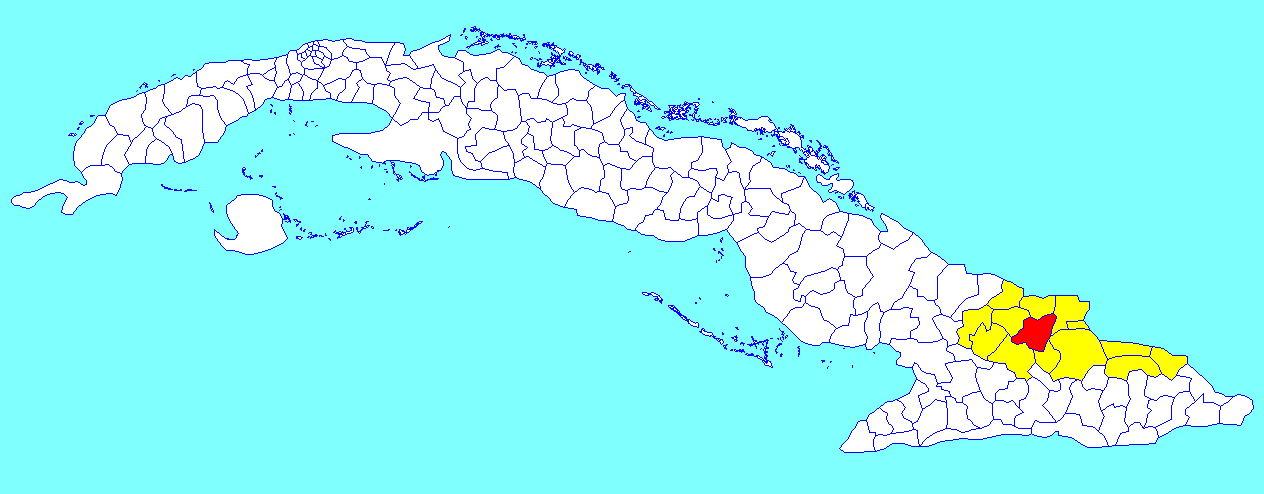
- Báguanos municipality (red) within Holguín Province (yellow) and Cuba
- Coordinates: 20°45′47″N 76°01′47″W
- Country: Cuba
- Province: Holguín

Area
  - Total: 806 km^{2} (311 sq mi)
- Elevation: 80 m (260 ft)

Population (2022)
  - Total: 47,851
  - Density: 59.4/km^{2} (154/sq mi)
- Time zone: UTC-5 (EST)
- Area code: +53-24

Báguanos (Spanish pronunciation: [ˈbaɣwanos]) is a municipality and town in the Holguín Province of Cuba.

== Geography ==
Located in the middle of the province, Báguanos is 34 kilometres (21 mi) far from Holguín and 52 kilometres (32 mi) from Banes. The municipal territory includes several villages. The most populated one is Tacajó.

== Demographics ==
In 2022, the municipality of Báguanos had a population of 47,851. With a total area of 806 km^{2} (311 sq mi), it has a population density of 59/km^{2} (150/sq mi).

== See also ==
- List of cities in Cuba
- Municipalities of Cuba
