= Río Cauto, Cuba =

Río Cauto
- Municipality
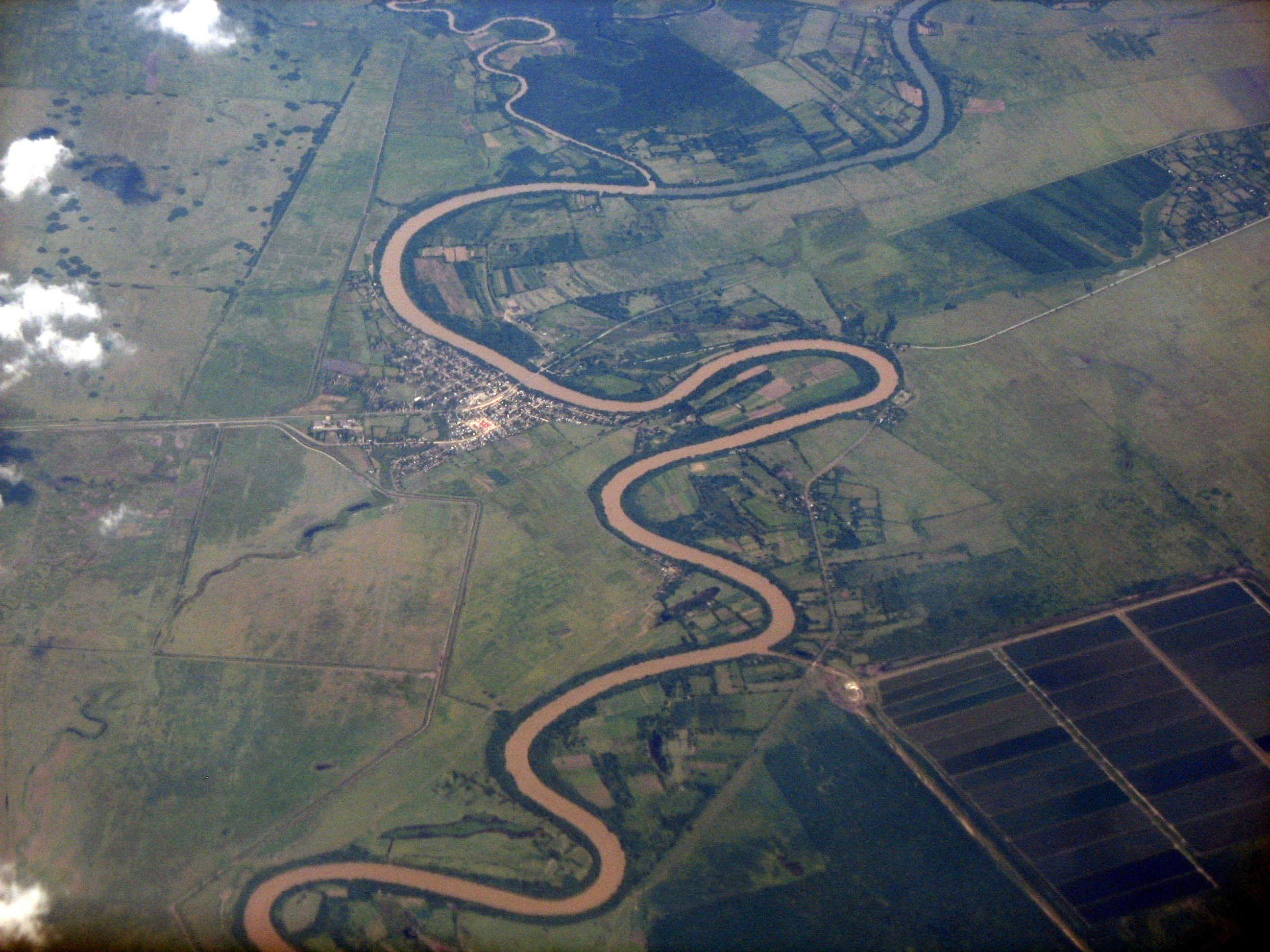

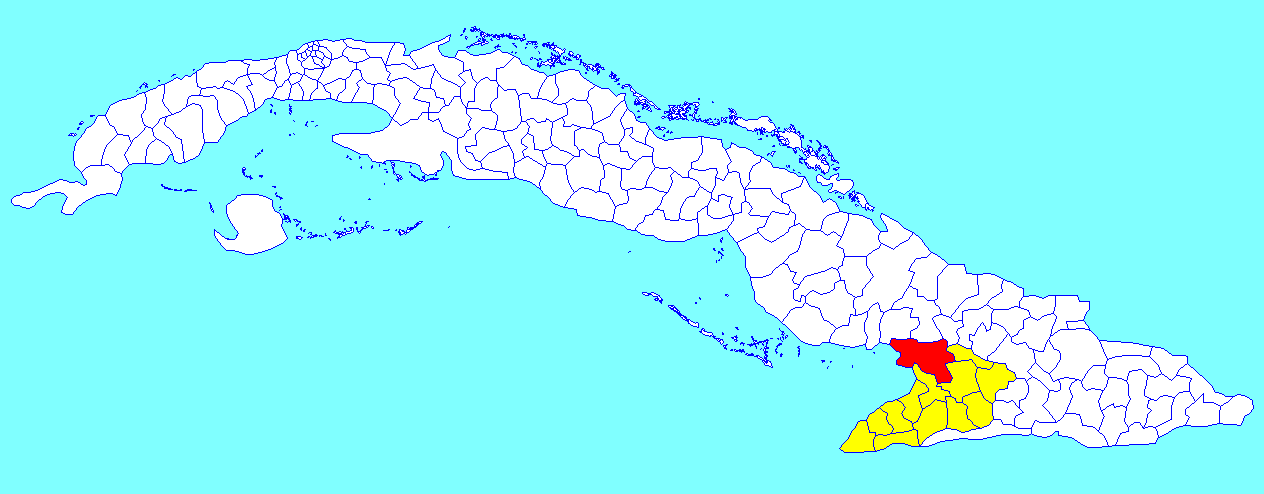
- Río Cauto municipality (red) within Granma Province (yellow) and Cuba
- Coordinates: 20°33′49″N 76°55′2″W
- Country: Cuba
- Province: Granma

Area
  - Total: 1,500 km^{2} (580 sq mi)
- Elevation: 10 m (33 ft)

Population (2022)
  - Total: 45,545
  - Density: 30/km^{2} (79/sq mi)
- Time zone: UTC-5 (EST)
- Area code: +53-23
- Website: https://www.riocauto.gob.cu/

Río Cauto is a municipality and town in the Granma Province of Cuba. It is located in the northern part of the province, upstream of the mouth of Cauto River.

== Demographics ==
In 2022, the municipality of Río Cauto had a population of 45,545. With a total area of 1,500 km^{2} (580 sq mi), it has a population density of 30/km^{2} (78/sq mi).

== See also ==
- Municipalities of Cuba
- List of cities in Cuba
