= Cauto River =

River in Cuba

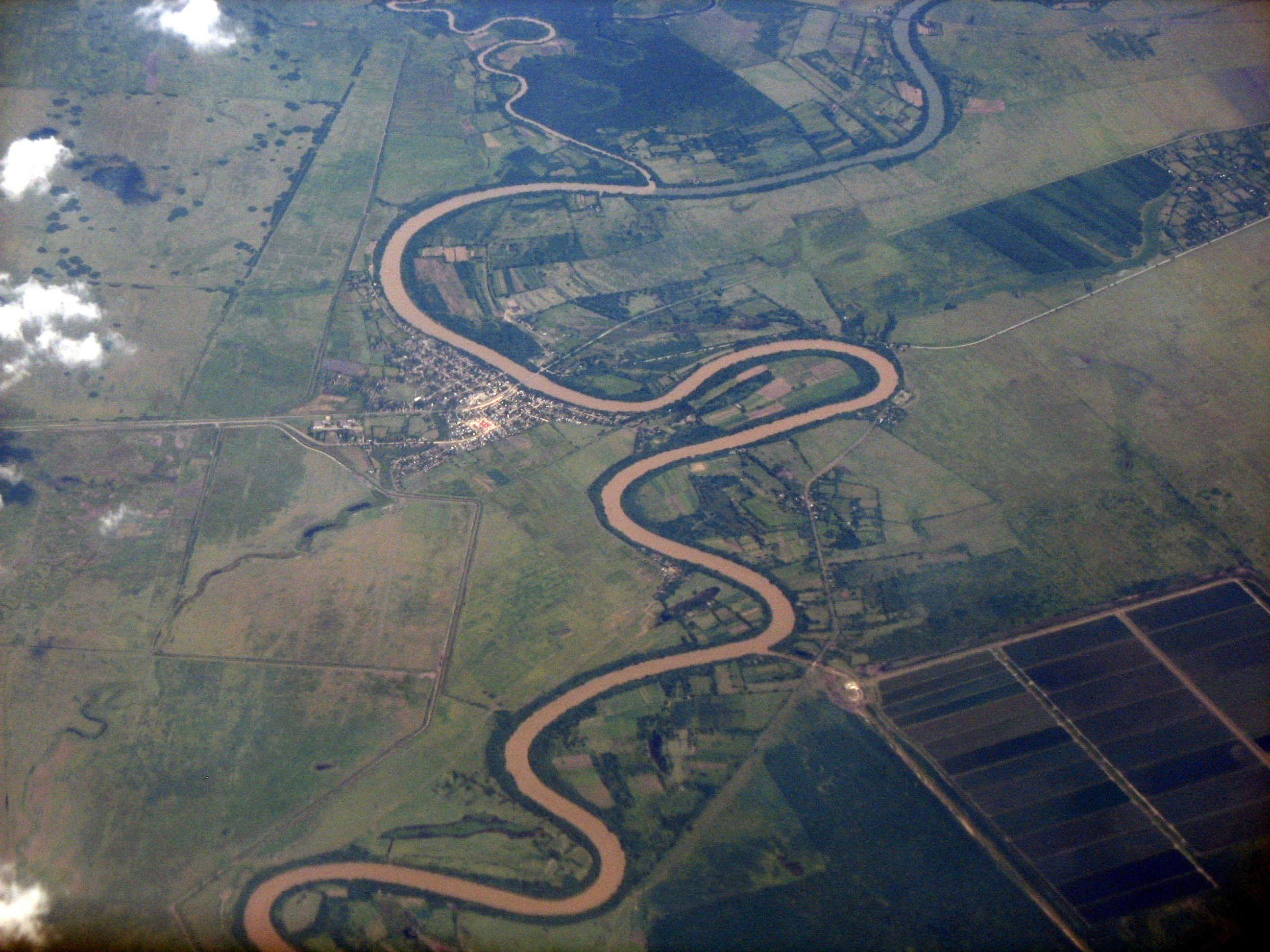
- Rio Cauto near Guamo Embarcadero

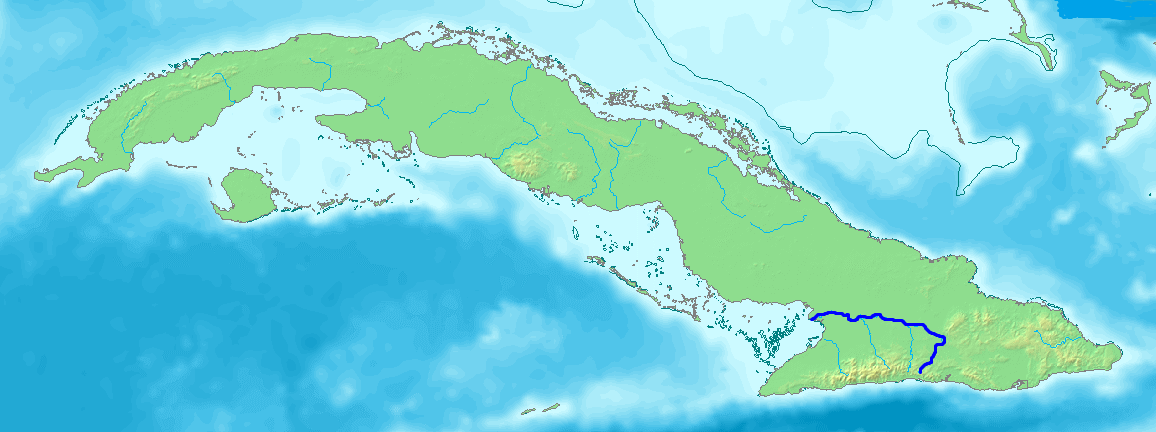

- Location of mouth

Location
- Country: Cuba

Physical characteristics
- Source
  - location: Sierra Maestra
  - elevation: 600 m (1,969 ft)
- Mouth: Caribbean Sea
  - location: Gulf of Guacanayabo
  - coordinates: 20°32′57″N 77°14′30″W
  - elevation: Sea level
- Length: 230 mi (370 km)
- Basin size: 8,928 km^{2} (3,447 sq mi)

The Cauto River or Río Cauto is the longest river in Cuba, as well as the longest river in the Caribbean. Located in the southeast of the island, it is one of two navigable rivers in Cuba, the other being the Sagua la Grande River.

== Overview ==
The Cauto flows for 343 km (213 mi) from the Sierra Maestra to the west and north-west, and enters the Caribbean Sea north of Manzanillo. However, it provides only 110 km (70 mi) of navigable waterway. A 2013 study led by multiple Cuban academic institutions determined that the river could be 'classified as unpolluted to moderately polluted'.

It flows through the provinces of Santiago de Cuba, Holguin, and Granma. The communities of Palma Soriano, Cauto Cristo, and Rio Cauto are located along the river. Rice, sugarcane, tobacco, and cattle are the primary agricultural beneficiaries along its course.

== Gallery ==
Cauto River

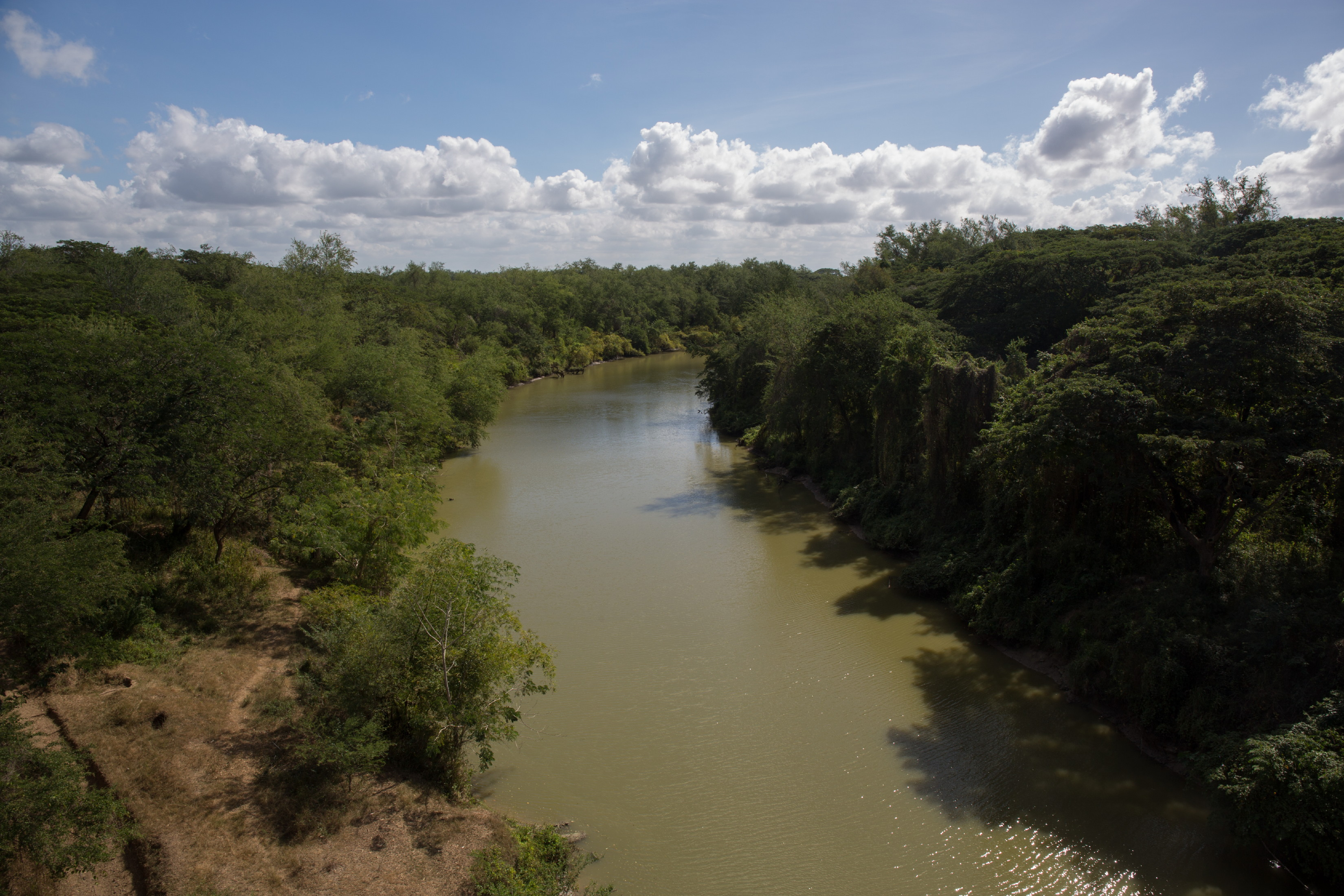

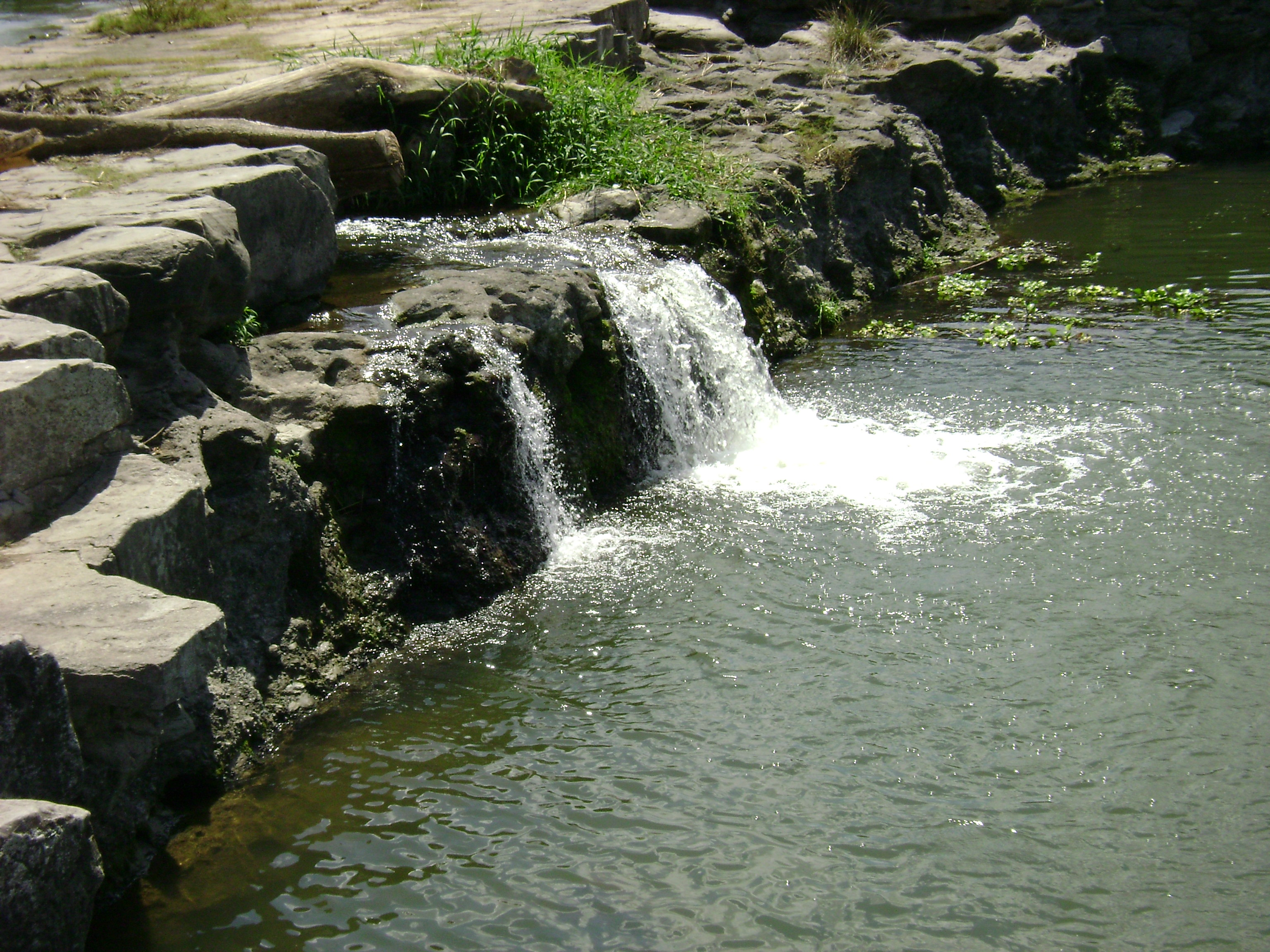

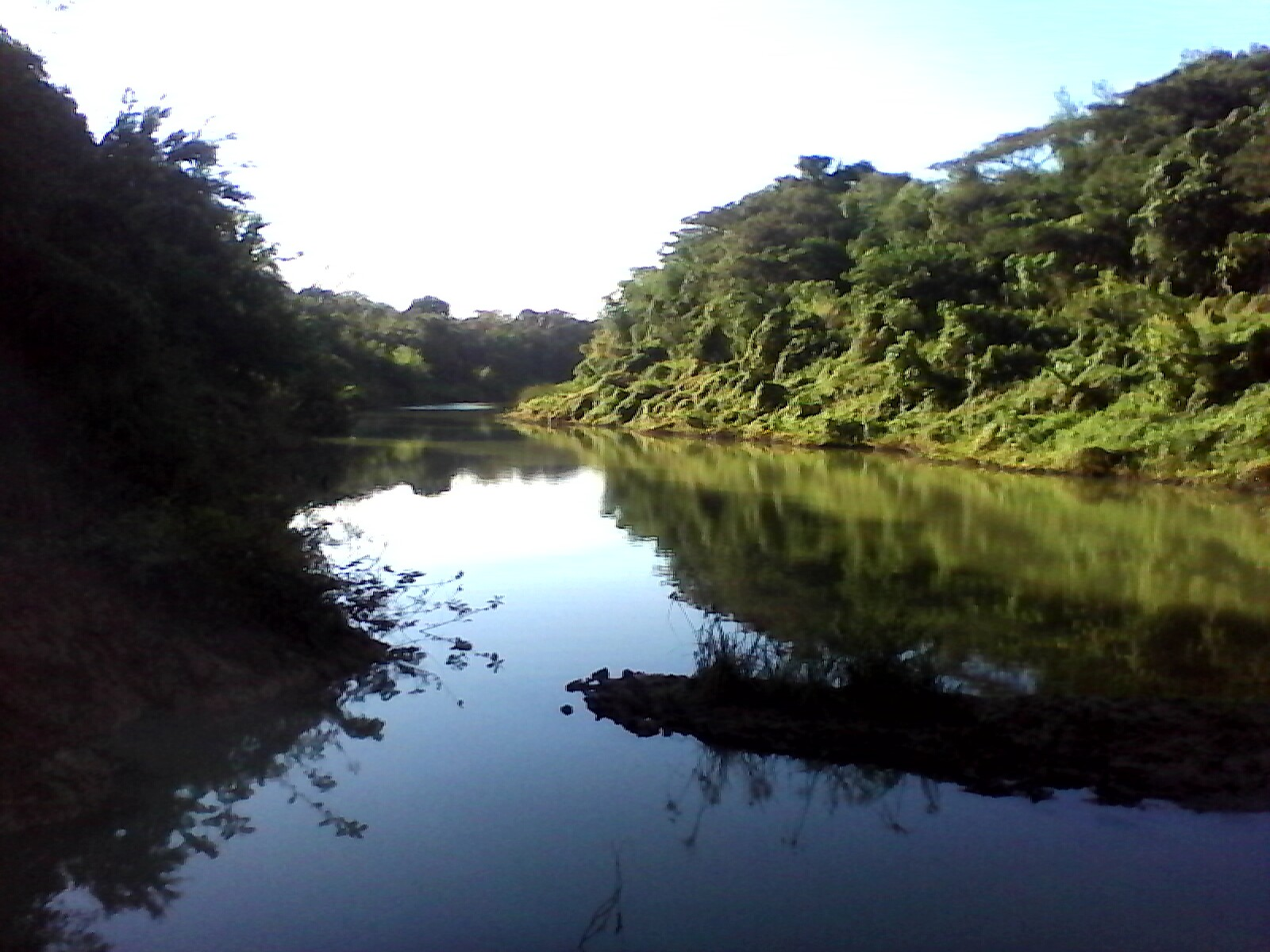

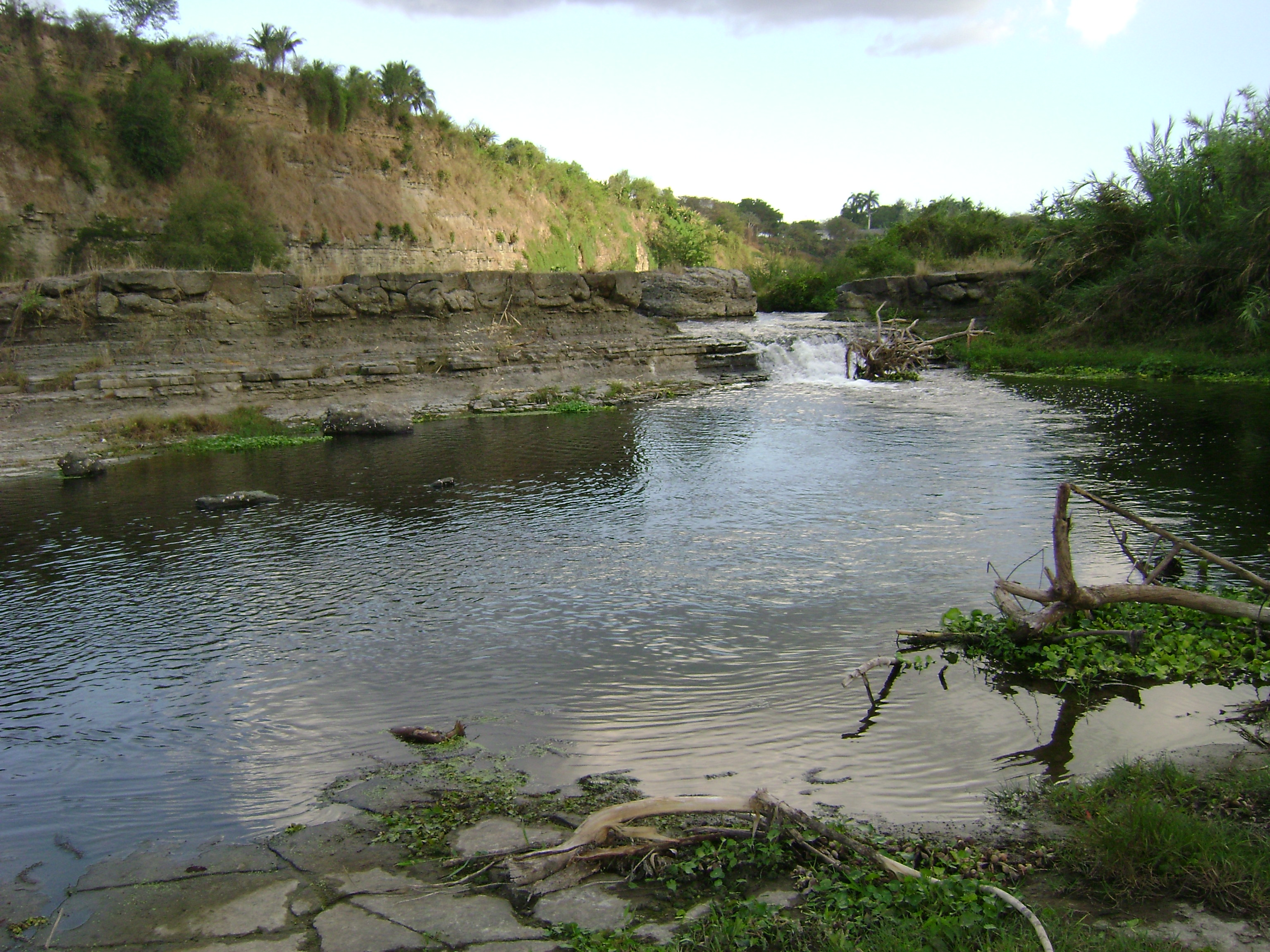
