= List of places in Cuba =

This is a list of places in Cuba.

== Cities and towns ==
=== Cities ===
- Bayamo
- Camagüey
- Ciego de Ávila
- Cienfuegos
- Guantánamo
- Havana
- Holguín
- Las Tunas
- Matanzas
- Pinar del Río
- Sancti Spíritus
- Santa Clara
- Santiago de Cuba

=== Towns ===
- Guanimar

== Provinces ==
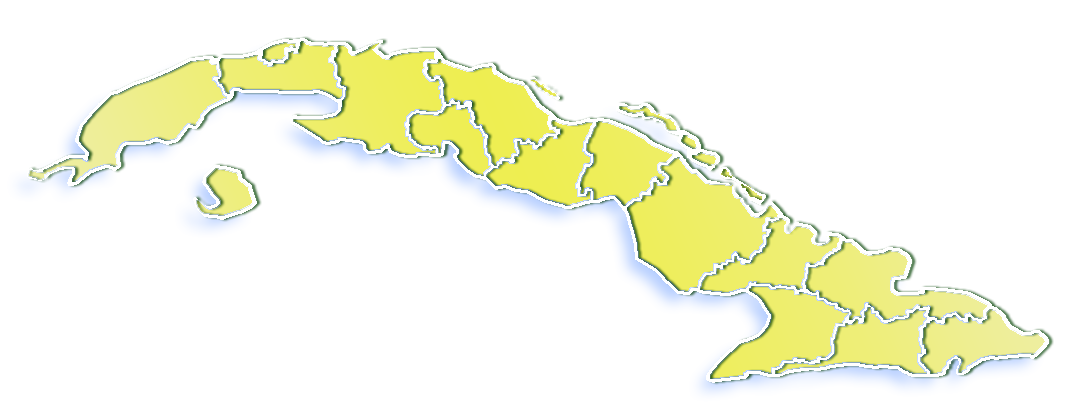
- Camagüey Province
- Ciego de Ávila Province
- Cienfuegos Province
- Ciudad de La Habana
- Granma Province
- Guantánamo Province
- Holguín Province
- La Habana Province (1976-2011)
  - Artemisa Province (2011–present)
  - Mayabeque Province (2011–present)
- Las Tunas Province
- Matanzas Province
- Pinar del Río Province
- Sancti Spiritus Province
- Santiago de Cuba Province
- Villa Clara Province

=== Historic provinces ===
- Pinar del Río
- Havana
- Matanzas
- Las Villas (before 1940, "Santa Clara"), contained the present day provinces of Cienfuegos, Villa Clara and Sancti Spíritus
- Camagüey (before 1899, "Puerto Príncipe"), contained the present day provinces of Camagüey and Ciego de Ávila
- Oriente (before 1905, "Santiago de Cuba"), contained the present day provinces of Las Tunas, Granma, Holguín, Santiago de Cuba and Guantánamo

=== Special territories ===
- Guantanamo Bay Naval Base, treaty enclave of the United States

== Geographic features ==
- Gulfs and bays: Gulf of Batabanó, Bay of Havana, Ensenada de la Broa, Bay of Cárdenas, Gulf of Cazones, Gulf of Guacanayabo, Guantánamo Bay, Bay of Pigs, Bay of Santa Clara, Bay of Matanzas
- Islands: Colorados Archipelago; Canarreos Archipelago: Isla de la Juventud (Isla de Pinos), Cayo Largo del Sur, Ernst Thälmann Island (Cayo Blanco), Jardines del Rey, Sabana-Camaguey Archipelago: Cayo Coco, Cayo Romano, Cayo Guajaba, Cayo Guillermo, Cayo Sabinal; Jardines de la Reina; Cayo Saetia
- Rivers: Almendares River, Cauto River, Toa River
- Lakes: Laguna de Leche, Ariguanabo, Zaza Reservoir (man-made)
- Mountains: Loma del Capiro, Topes de Collantes, Escambray Mountains, Mogotes de Jumagua, Sierra Cristal, Sierra Maestra, Sierra del Rosario, San Juan Hill, Cuchillas del Toa, Pico Turquino, El Yunque
- Other: Guanahacabibes Peninsula, Hicacos Peninsula, Viñales Valley, Zapata Peninsula, Escaleras de Jaruco

== Municipalities ==
The provinces of Cuba are divided into 200 municipalities (municipios). They were defined by Cuban Law Number 1304 of July 3, 1976. The municipalities are listed below, by province:

Province	Municipalities
Artemisa Province	
Camagüey Province	
Ciego de Ávila Province	
Cienfuegos Province	
Granma Province	
Guantánamo Province	
Havana	Arroyo Naranjo; Boyeros; Centro Habana; Cerro; Cotorro; Diez de Octubre; Guanabacoa; La Habana del Este; La Habana Vieja; La Lisa; Marianao; Playa; Plaza de la Revolución; Regla; San Miguel del Padrón
Holguín Province	
Isla de la Juventud	Isla de la Juventud (seat: Nueva Gerona)
Las Tunas Province	
Matanzas Province	
Mayabeque Province	
Pinar del Río Province	
Sancti Spíritus Province	
Santiago de Cuba Province	
Villa Clara Province	
