= Spanish West Indies =

Spanish colony from 1492 to 1898

Spanish West Indies Las Antillas Españolas
- 1492–1898
- Flag Coat of arms
- Anthem: Marcha Real "Royal March"
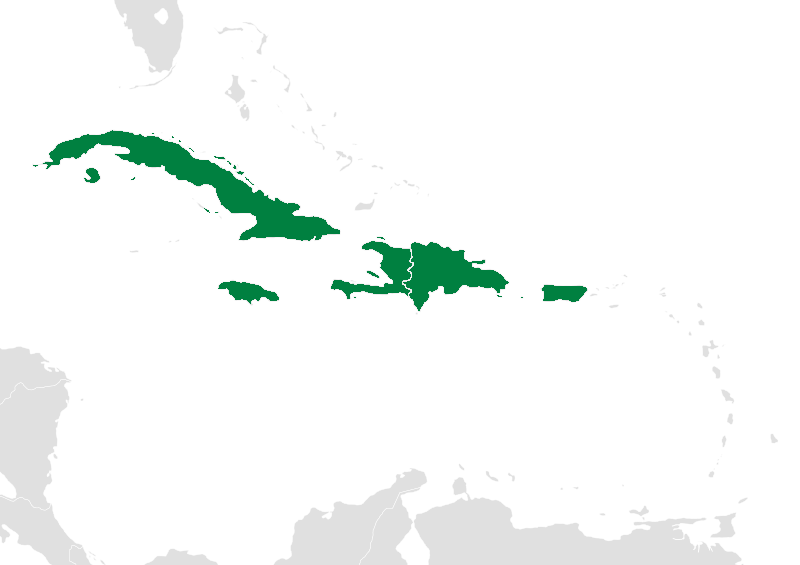
- Map of the Greater Antilles, under direct Spanish rule as part of the Viceroyalty of New Spain.
- Status: Possessions of the Spanish Empire
- Capital: Madrid
- Common languages: Spanish, Taino
- Religion: Roman Catholicism
- Demonym: Españoles Antillanos (Spanish Antillean)
- Monarch
  - 1492–1504: Ferdinand II
  - 1492–1504: Isabella I
  - 1896–1898: Alfonso XIII
- Historical era: Spanish colonization
  - Columbus landed in San Salvador: 12 October 1492
  - Treaty of Paris: 10 December 1898
- Currency: Spanish colonial real, Spanish dollar
Preceded by
Viceroyalty of New Spain
Succeeded by
Era de Francia
Captaincy General of Santo Domingo
Captaincy General of Cuba
Captaincy General of Puerto Rico
- Today part of: Cuba; Dominican Republic; Puerto Rico

The Spanish West Indies, Spanish Caribbean or the Spanish Antilles (also known as "Las Antillas Occidentales" or simply "Las Antillas Españolas" in Spanish) were Spanish territories in the Caribbean. In terms of governance of the Spanish Empire, the Indies was the designation for all its overseas territories and was overseen by the Council of the Indies, founded in 1524 and based in Spain. When the Crown established the Viceroyalty of New Spain in 1535, the islands of the Caribbean came under its jurisdiction.

The islands ruled by Spain were chiefly the Greater Antilles: Hispaniola (including modern-day Haiti and the Dominican Republic), Cuba, Jamaica, and Puerto Rico. The majority of the Taíno, the Indigenous populations on these islands, had died out or had mixed with the European colonizers by 1520. Spain also claimed the Lesser Antilles including Martinica, but these smaller islands remained largely independent until they were seized or ceded to other European powers as a result of war, or diplomatic agreements during the 17th and 18th centuries.

The islands that became the Spanish West Indies were the focus of the voyages of the Spanish expedition of Christopher Columbus to the Americas. Largely due to the familiarity that Spaniards gained from Columbus's voyages, the islands were also the first lands to be permanently colonized by Europeans in the Americas. The Spanish West Indies were also the most enduring part of Spain's American Empire, only ending with Cuba and Puerto Rico being surrendered in 1898 at the end of the Spanish–American War. For over three centuries, Spain controlled a network of ports in the Caribbean including Havana (Cuba), Santo Domingo (Dominican Republic), San Juan (Puerto Rico), Cartagena de Indias (Colombia), Veracruz (Mexico), and Portobelo (Panama), which were connected by galleon routes.

== Change of sovereignty or independence ==
- Martinica was ceded to France in 1635.
- The Bay Islands were ceded to England in 1643 and then to Honduras in 1861.
- Colony of Santiago—Jamaica was captured by England in 1655, confirmed in the Treaty of Madrid (1670).
- The Cayman Islands were ceded to England in the Treaty of Madrid in 1670.
- Haiti (western Hispaniola) was ceded to France in the Treaty of Ryswick in 1697 (Saint-Domingue).
- Trinidad was captured by Britain during the invasion of Trinidad, confirmed in the Treaty of Amiens in 1802.
- Captaincy General of Santo Domingo (eastern Hispaniola) was ceded to France after the War of the First Coalition per the Treaty of Ryswick in 1697. It was later returned to Spain, and gained its first independence from Spain as the Republic of Spanish Haiti in 1821, then from Haiti in 1844 as the First Dominican Republic, and finally from Spain at the end of the Dominican Restoration War in 1865, when the Second Dominican Republic was proclaimed.
- Captaincy General of Cuba was lost to the United States in 1898 after the Spanish–American War, concluded by the 1898 Treaty of Paris.
- Captaincy General of Puerto Rico was lost to the United States in 1898 after the Spanish–American War, concluded by the 1898 Treaty of Paris.

== Spanish Caribbean ==
Today, the term Spanish Caribbean or Hispanophone Caribbean refers to the Spanish-speaking areas in the Caribbean Sea, specifically Cuba, the Dominican Republic, Puerto Rico, Nicaragua, Panama, and the northern coasts of Colombia and Venezuela. In a broader sense, the Spanish Caribbean may include Guatemala, Honduras and the eastern coast of Mexico; however, the latter share little culturally with the aforementioned countries. It includes regions where Spanish is the main language, and where the legacy of Spanish settlement and colonization influences culture, through religion, language, cuisine, and so on. The varieties of Spanish that predominate in this region are known collectively as Caribbean Spanish.

The Spanish Caribbean can be considered a separate subregion of Latin America, culturally distinct from both continental Spanish-speaking countries and the non-Spanish-speaking Caribbean. Apart from culture, the Spanish Caribbean is different racially as well. In contrast to the predominantly black-majority of the non-Hispanic Caribbean, the Hispanic Caribbean similar to other areas of Hispanic Latin America, is dominated by mixed-race people. However, in the Spanish Caribbean, similar to the non-Hispanic Caribbean, there is a significant African cultural component. The majority of the mixed-race population in the Hispanic Caribbean is made up of mulattos/tri-racials, being of mixed white Spanish, black West African, and to a lesser degree indigenous Taino ancestry, who also make up the majority of the total population overall, especially in the Dominican Republic, as opposed to mestizos in many continental Hispanic countries. The Hispanic Caribbean has less African admixture and influence than the non-Hispanic Caribbean and more than the most other Spanish speaking regions, while having more indigenous admixture than the rest of the Caribbean but less than Spanish speaking regions outside of the Caribbean. There are also smaller amounts of whites and blacks, who are predominantly of European or African ancestry.

The average Puerto Rican is about 65% European, 20% sub-Saharan African, and 15% Indigenous. The average Dominican is about 52% European, 40% sub-Saharan African, and 8% Indigenous. The average Cuban is about 72% European, 20% sub-Saharan African, and 8% Indigenous. Indigenous ancestry in the Spanish Caribbean comes from the Taino people, who were native to the Greater Antilles region. Sub-Saharan African ancestry in the Hispanic Caribbean, just like the rest of Latin America, comes from various parts of West and Central Africa. European ancestry, mainly comes from Spain, especially from the southern regions of Spain such as Andalusia and the Canary Islands. The Spanish Caribbean were treated as "forgotten backwater colonies" during the colonial era, the spanish settlers that settled the islands were mostly poorer peasants from the south, especially from the Canary Islands. The Spanish Caribbean has higher Canarian influence compared to continental Latin America, making them the primary European ancestral group, many cultural aspects come from Canarian settlers including the Caribbean Spanish accents. Non-Spanish Europeans immigrated to the Spanish Caribbean as well. In fact, due to white French fleeing Haiti after independence to the surrounding Hispanic Caribbean, around 18% of surnames in the Spanish Caribbean are of French origin, second highest after Spanish. This mixture of European (especially Canarian), West African, and Taino is heavily reflected in the culture. Cultural characteristics of the Spanish Caribbean include musical genres like salsa, merengue, bachata, and reggaeton, as well as love for the sports of baseball and boxing.

The term is used in contrast to Anglophone Caribbean, French Caribbean, and Dutch Caribbean, which are other modern linguistic divisions of the Caribbean region. The Hispanophone Caribbean is a part of the wider Hispanic America, which includes all the Spanish-speaking countries in the Americas. Historically, coastal areas of Spanish Florida and the Caribbean South America (cf. the Spanish Main) were closely tied to the Spanish Caribbean. During the period of Spanish settlement and colonization of the New World, the Spanish West Indies referred to those settlements in islands of the Caribbean Sea under political administration of Spain, as in the phrase "a 1765 cedula authorized seven sea ports, in addition to the port of San Juan, to trade with the Spanish Caribbean." Until the early 19th century these territories were part of the Viceroyalty of New Spain.

In a modern sense, the Caribbean islands of Colombia could be included in the Hispanophone Caribbean as well, due to the fact they are located in the Caribbean, but not in the Antilles.

== Islands ==
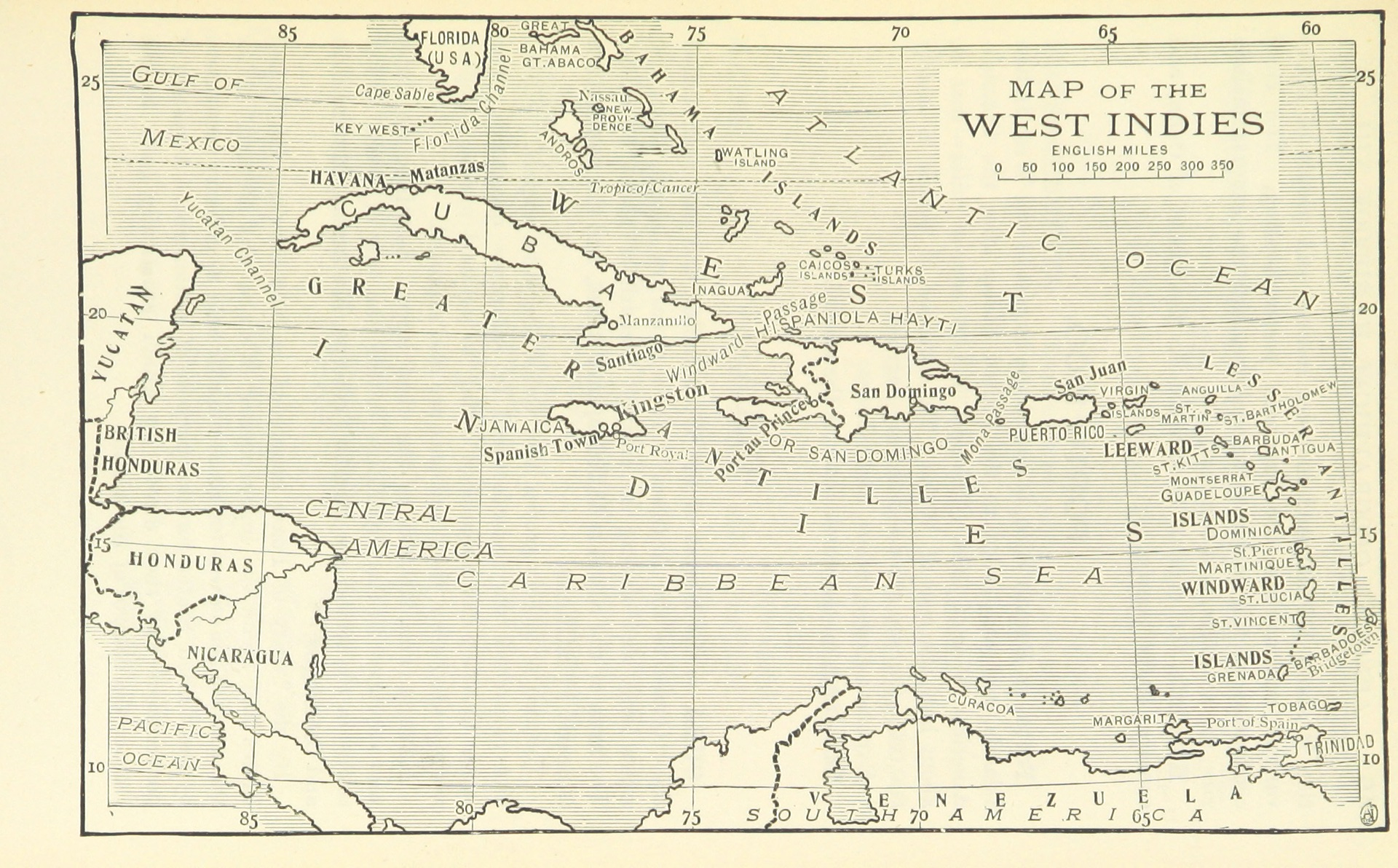
Map of the West Indies published in 1899

Below is a list of islands belonging geographically to the Greater and Lesser Antilles and that were under Spanish rule in various stages of history, until it became independent from Spain. Several islands which were previously largely under Spanish rule, but since they were passed into the domain of France, England, or the Netherlands, are no longer considered part of the Spanish Caribbean.

In addition, the Colombian islands of San Andrés, Providencia and Santa Catalina are located in the Caribbean, but are not part of the Antilles. Under intermittent periods of Spanish rule, these islands were administered as part of the Spanish Main (initially Guatemala, later New Granada).

West Indian islands that were under Spanish rule
Political entity	Islands of the West Indies	Status
Cuba	Isla de Cuba — Isla de la Juventud — Sabana-Camagüey Archipelago — Cayo Blanco del Sur — Cayo Levisa — Cayo Los Ensenachos — Cayo Largo del Sur — Jardines de la Reina — Cayo Guillermo — Cayo Coco — Cayo Romano — Cayo Guajaba — Cayo Sabinal — Cayo Santa María — Cayo Paredón Grande — Colorados Archipelago — Cayo Saetía — Cayo Blanco	Independent republic from Spain since 1898
Dominican Republic	Eastern Hispaniola — Saona — Beata — Catalina — Alto Velo — Cayo Levantado	Independent republic from Spain since 1821, independent from Haiti since 1844
Puerto Rico	Isla de Puerto Rico — Culebra — Vieques — Mona — Monito — Desecheo — Caja de Muertos — Isla de Cabras — Cayo Batata — Isla Cardona — Cayos de Caña Gorda — Culebrita — Icacos — Cayo Luis Peña — Isla Magueyes — Cayo Norte — Isla Palominos — Isla de Ratones — Isleta de San Juan — Cayo Santiago — Spanish Virgin Islands	Commonwealth of the United States, independent from Spain since 1898
Venezuela	Isla de Margarita — Coche — Cubagua (form the state of Nueva Esparta) Los Monjes — Las Aves — Los Roques (Gran Roque, Francisquí, Isla Larga, Nordisquí, Madrisquí, Crasquí, Cayo Espenquí, Cayo Carenero, Cayo de Agua, Dos Mosquises, Cayo Sal, Cayo Grande) — Los Hermanos — Los Frailes — Aves — La Sola — La Tortuga (Cayo Herradura — Islas Los Tortuguillos) — La Orchila — La Blanquilla — Los Testigos — Patos (ceded from British Trinidad in 1942, form the Federal Dependencies of Venezuela)	Independent republic from Spain since 1811, recognized by Spain in 1845

== See also ==
- Antillean Confederation
- British West Indies
- Danish West Indies
- Dutch West Indies
- French West Indies
- New Spain
- Population history of American indigenous peoples
- Province of Tierra Firme
- Spanish colonization of the Americas
- Spanish East Indies
- Voyages of Christopher Columbus
- Culture of Cuba
- Culture of Dominican Republic
- Culture of Puerto Rico
