= Sabana-Camagüey Archipelago =

Achipelago on Cuba's north-central Atlantic coast

Coordinates: 23°00′N 80°00′W

Location of Sabana-Camagüey Archipelago in Cuba

The Sabana-Camagüey Archipelago (Spanish: Archipiélago de Sabana-Camagüey) (SCA) is an archipelago off Cuba's north-central Atlantic coast of the provinces of Matanzas, Villa Clara, Sancti Spíritus, Ciego de Ávila and Camagüey, and is bounded to the north by the Atlantic Ocean, specifically the Nicholas Channel (Sabana segment) and Old Bahama Channel (Camagüey segment).

== Geography ==
The archipelago is oriented on a general north-west to south-east axis, and stretches for 465 kilometres (289 mi) or 475 kilometres (295 mi) from the Hicacos Peninsula and Varadero to the Bay of Nuevitas, with a maximum width of 50 kilometres (31 mi). The entire system covers more than 8,311 square kilometres (3,209 sq mi) and is composed of 2515 or approximately 2517 cays and islets. The eastern islands are grouped in the Jardines del Rey archipelago, and include Cayo Coco, Cayo Guillermo and Cayo Romano, among others.

== Conservation ==
The SCA contains 22 Protected Natural Areas (PNA): "two National Parks (NP), five Ecological Reserves (ER), nine Wildlife Refuges (WR), one Featured Natural Element (FNE), three Protected Areas of Managed Resources (PAMR), and two Managed Floristic Reserves (MFR) ... on coastal sections, keys, islets or marine waters". The Sabana-Camagüey ecosystem includes the Bay of Buena Vista Biosphere Reserve and Caguanes National Park. In 1997, the archipelago was designated the second Particularly Sensitive Sea Area, after the Great Barrier Reef of Australia. Cayos Romano-Cruz-Megano Grande IBA, comprising cayos Romano and Cruz and many other cays and islets, is an Important Bird Area.

Construction of tourism infrastructure has caused serious ecological damage. In the San Juan de los Remedios and Buenavista bays, it is responsible for "a major increase in water salinity that could potentially lead to the disappearance of 60 marine species" and raised the already high salinity of Bahía de los Perros by 80%, causing deterioration of the sea bottom. The region has also seen the loss of over 5,000 hectares (12,000 acres) of mangroves. On Cayo Coco, tourism has severely affected the "most significant breeding ground of the roseate spoonbill and the greater flamingo. Beach erosion is also a problem.

Visual census surveys conducted in 1988–1989 and 2000 found a 2/3 reduction in fish density and biomass on coral reefs.

Marine debris from heavy sea traffic through the Old Bahama Channel is a concern.

The coastal and marine ecosystem of the archipelago is undergoing conservation projects supported by the Global Environment Facility and Environment Canada. Mangroves and coastal forests effectively create a buffer zone between the agricultural coast and the sensitive marine environment.

== Economic activity and potential ==
The region is Cuba's second-richest fishing ground, and fishing—commercial, for self-consumption and recreational—is the main employer of various local communities.

Native species with potential for aquaculture include "sessile bivalve mollusks, such as oysters of the family Ostreidae, mussels of the family Mytilidae, and clams of the families Veneridae and Arcidae ... the sea cucumber, sponges, and some marine algae."

== Partial list of cays ==
=== Sabana section ===
- Cayo Piedras
- Cayo Cruz del Padre
- Cayo Blanco _{(fr)}
- Cayo Cinco Leguas _{(es)}
- Cayo Inglés
- Cayo Falcones
- Cayo Megano
- Cayo Blanquizal _{(es)}
- Cayo Sotavento _{(es)}
- Cayo Verde
- Cayo Hicacal _{(es)}
- Cayo La Vela
- Cayos de Pajonal
- Cayo Fragoso

=== Camagüey section ===
- Cayo Francés _{(fr)}
- Cayo Santa Maria
- Cayo Caiman Grande
- Jardines del Rey
  - Cayo Guillermo
  - Cayo Coco
  - Cayo Judas
  - Cayo Romano
  - Cayo Paredón Grande _{(fr)}
  - Cayo Megano Grande
  - Cayo Eusebio
  - Cayo Cruz
  - Cayo Guajaba
  - Cayo Sabinal
  - Cayo Confites

== See also ==
- Geography of Cuba
