= Volvarina sofiae =

Scientific classification
- Kingdom: Animalia
- Phylum: Mollusca
- Class: Gastropoda
- Subclass: Caenogastropoda
- Order: Neogastropoda
- Family: Marginellidae
- Genus: Volvarina
- Species: V. sofiae

Binomial name
- Volvarina sofiae Ortea & Espinosa, 1998

Species of gastropod

Volvarina sofiae is a species of sea snail, a marine gastropod mollusk in the family Marginellidae, the margin snails.

It is named after Queen Sofía of Spain, to honor the first visit of Spanish monarchs to Cuba, which happened in 1999.

== Distribution ==
This species is known only from specimens collected in Jardines del Rey archipelago, Cuba.
