= Spanish Indies =

The Spanish Indies may refer to the following:

- The Spanish West Indies (1492–1898) Colony of Spain that covered most of the Caribbean
- The Spanish East Indies (1565–1901) The overseas territories of the Spanish Empire that covered the Philippine Islands and other parts of the East Indies
