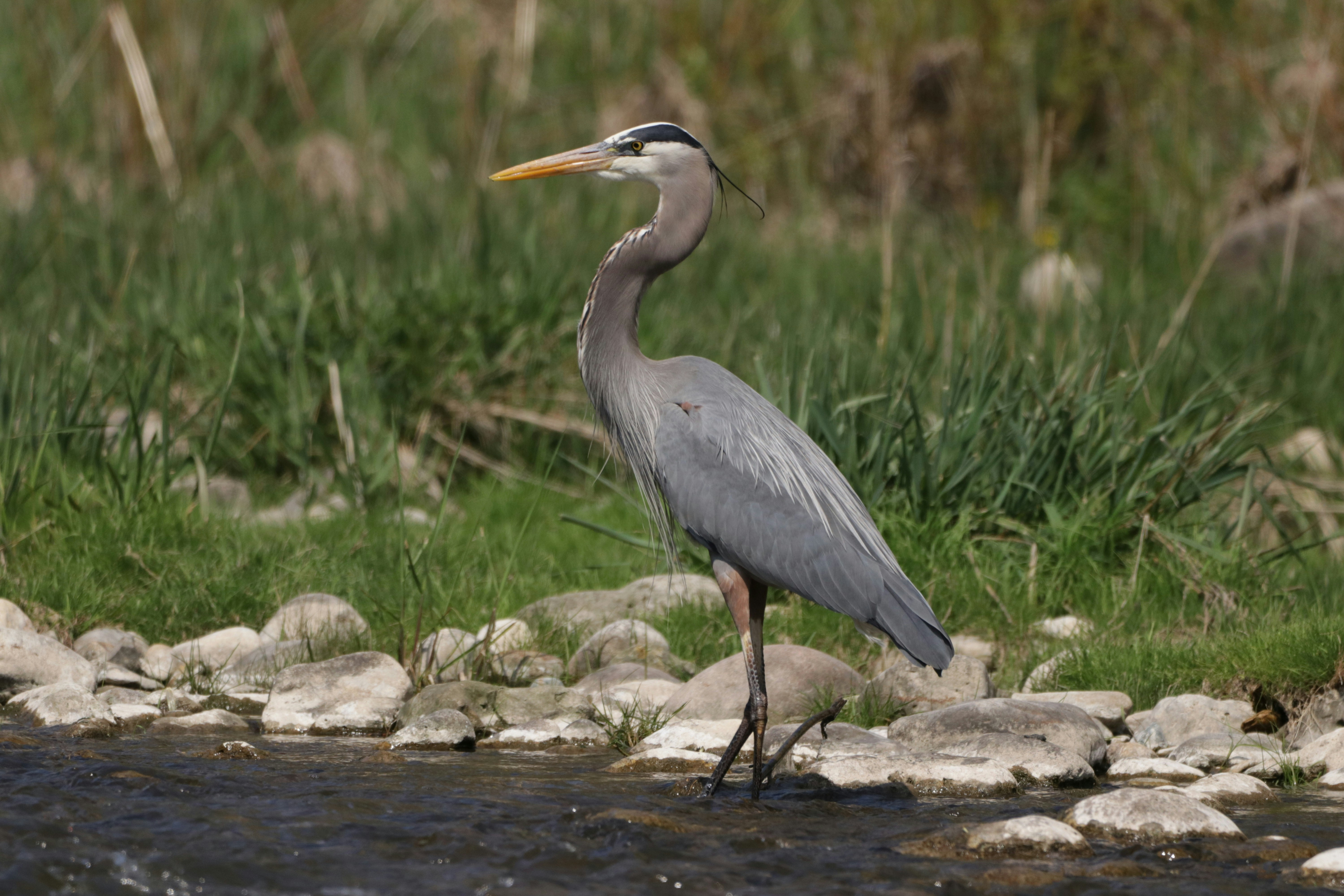
- A. h. herodias, in Ontario, Canada
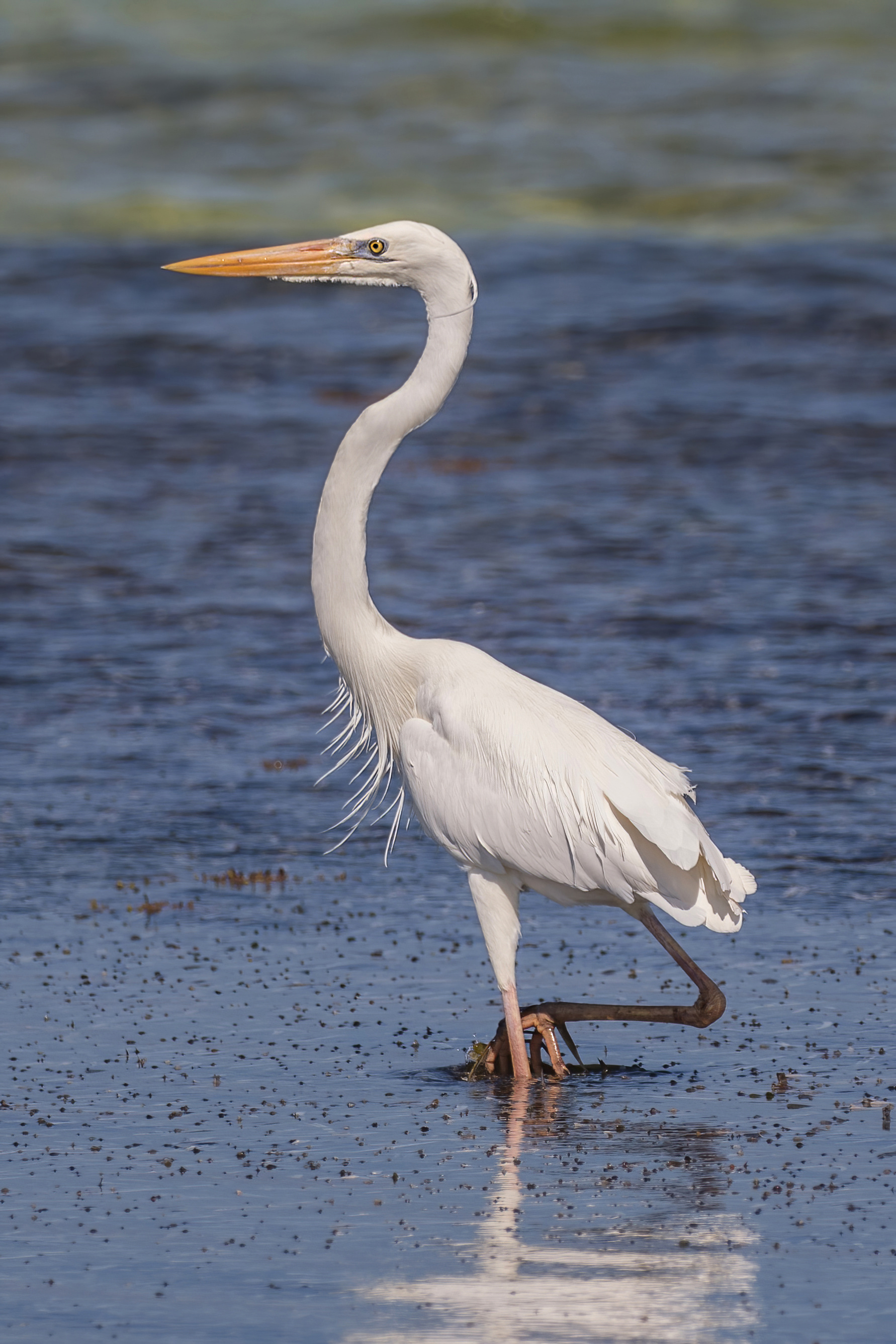
- A. h. occidentalis, in Cayo Guillermo National Park, Cuba

Conservation status
- Least Concern (IUCN 3.1)

Scientific classification
- Kingdom: Animalia
- Phylum: Chordata
- Class: Aves
- Order: Pelecaniformes
- Family: Ardeidae
- Genus: Ardea
- Species: A. herodias

Binomial name
- Ardea herodias Linnaeus, 1758
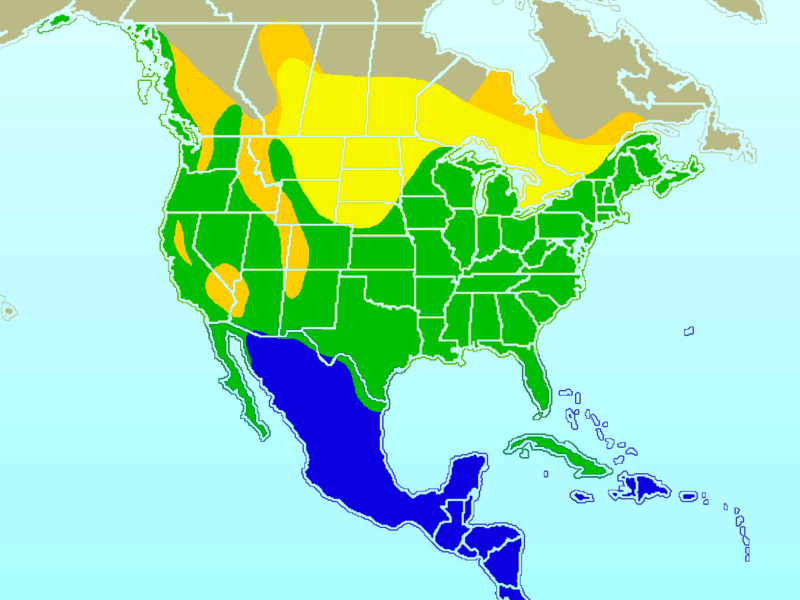
- North American range (also in far northwestern South America, not shown) Breeding range Year-round range Wintering range Present during migration

Audio

= Great blue heron =

Great blue heron Temporal range: Pleistocene–present

Species of bird

The great blue heron (Ardea herodias) is a large wading bird in the heron family (Ardeidae), common near shores of open water and wetlands over most of North and Central America, as well as Northwestern South America, the Caribbean, and the Galápagos Islands. It is occasionally found in the Azores and is a rare vagrant to Europe. An all-white population found in South Florida, the Florida Keys, and the Caribbean islands, is known as the great white heron. Debate exists about whether these white birds are a color morph of the great blue heron, a subspecies of it, or an entirely separate species.

== Taxonomy ==
The great blue heron was one of many species originally described by Carl Linnaeus in his 18th-century work, Systema Naturae. The scientific name comes from Latin ardea, and Ancient Greek ἐρῳδιός (erōdios), both meaning "heron".

The great blue heron's niche in the Old World is filled by the congeneric grey heron (Ardea cinerea), which is somewhat smaller at 90–98 cm (35–39 in) and sports a pale gray neck and legs, lacking the brown hues of the great blue heron. The great blue heron forms a superspecies with the grey heron, which also includes the Cocoi heron of South America, which differs in having more extensive black on the head and a white breast and neck.

=== Subspecies ===
The five subspecies are:

Image	Subspecies	Distribution
	A. h. herodias Linnaeus, 1758	Most of North America, except as below
	A. h. fannini Chapman, 1901	Pacific Northwest, from southern Alaska south to Washington; coastal
	A. h. wardi Ridgway, 1882	Kansas and Oklahoma to northern Florida, sightings in southeastern Georgia
	A. h. occidentalis Audubon, 1835	southern Florida, Caribbean islands, formerly known as a separate species, the great white heron
	A. h. cognata Bangs, 1903	Galápagos Islands

== Description ==
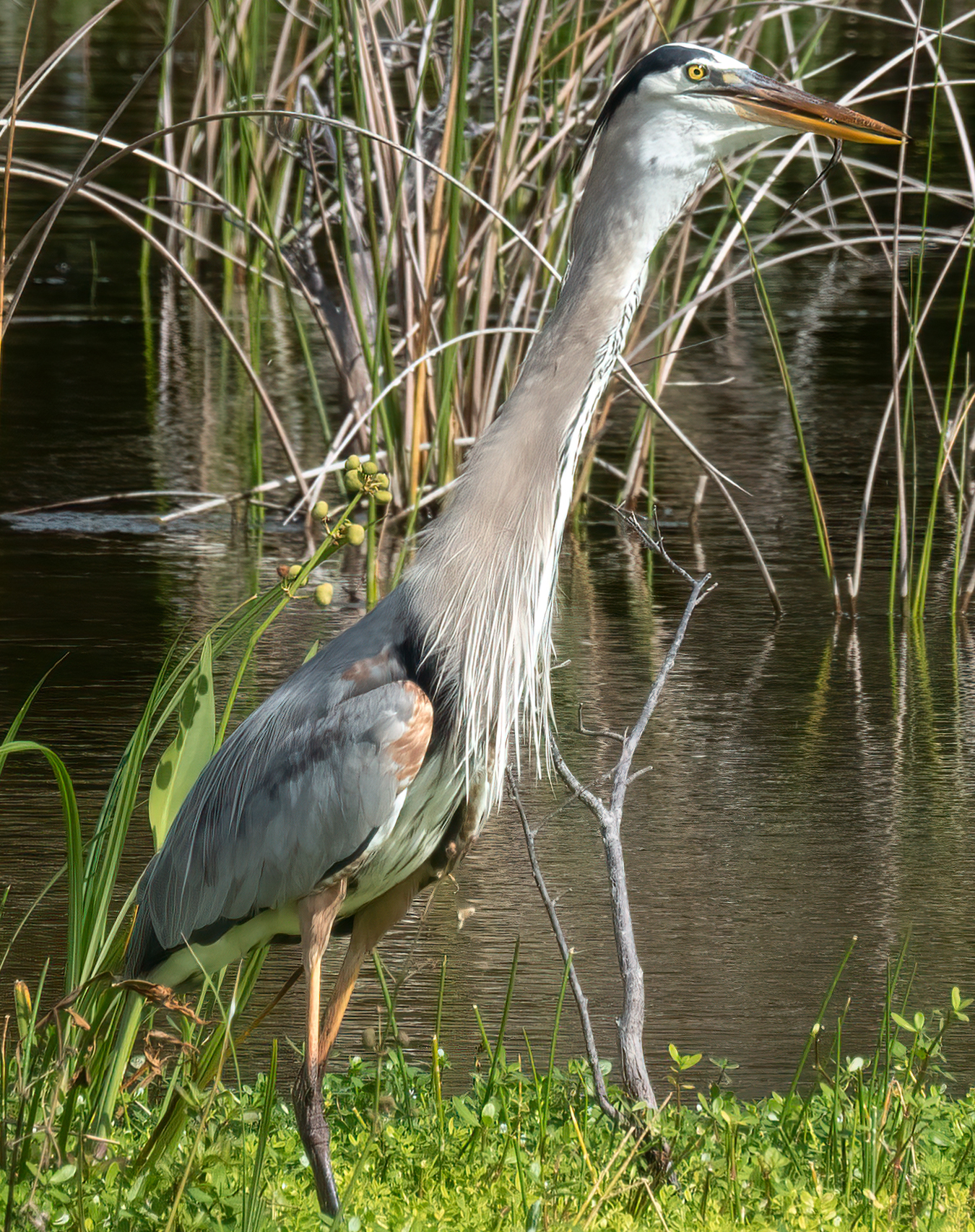
Neck fully extended, while swallowing a brown water snake

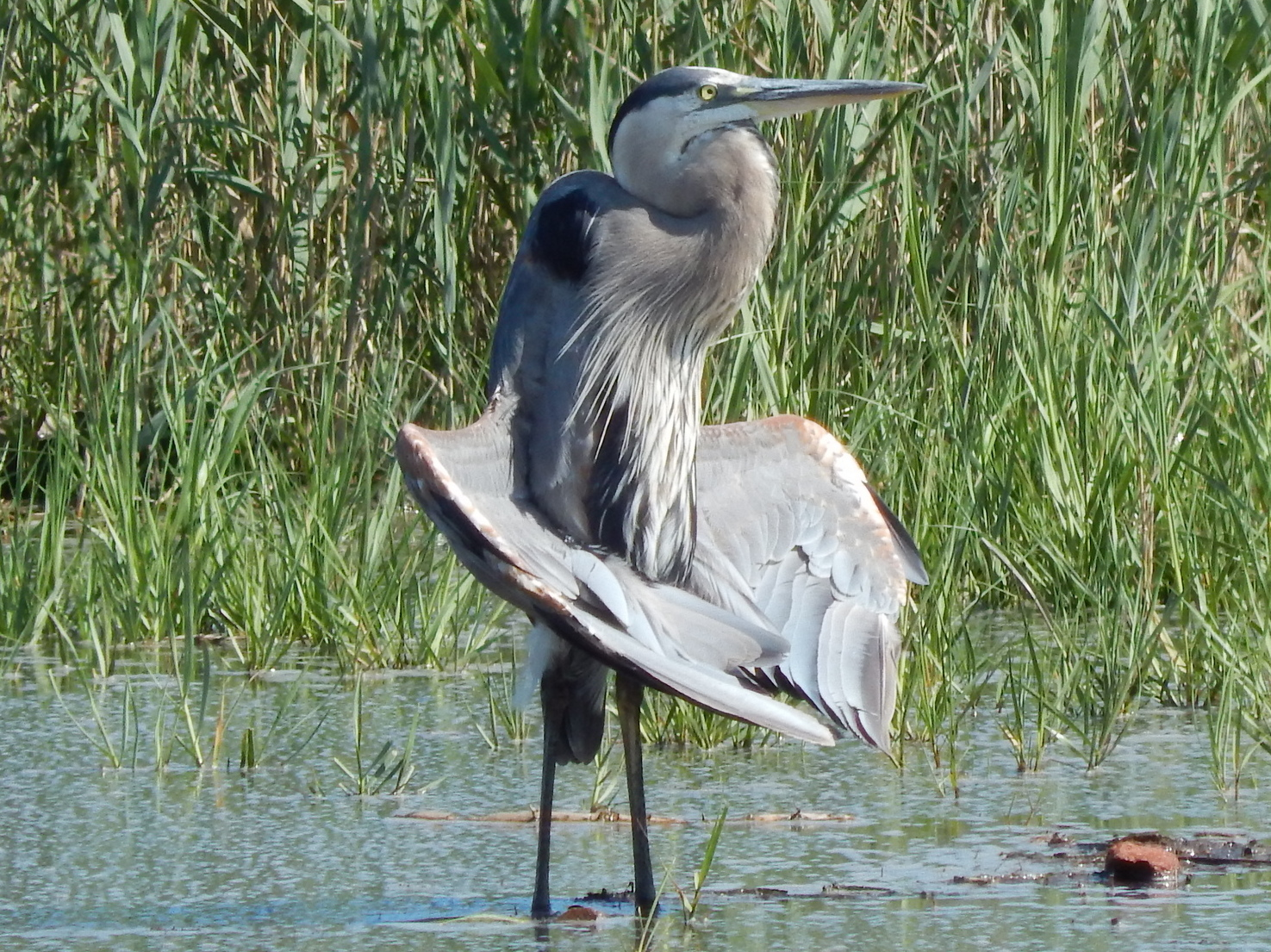
Sunning, in the delta-wing posture

The great blue heron is the largest heron native to North America. Among all extant herons, it is surpassed in size only by the Goliath heron (Ardea goliath) and the white-bellied heron (Ardea insignis). It exhibits a minor degree of sexual dimorphism; males are slightly larger than females, but otherwise the sexes are not easily outwardly distinguishable. It has a head-to-tail length of 91–137 cm (36–54 in), a wingspan of 167–201 cm (66–79 in), a height of 115–138 cm (45–54 in), and a weight of 1.82–3.6 kg (4.0–7.9 lb). In British Columbia, adult males averaged 2.48 kg (5.5 lb) and adult females 2.11 kg (4.7 lb). In Nova Scotia and New England, adult herons of both sexes averaged 2.23 kg (4.9 lb), while in Oregon, both sexes averaged 2.09 kg (4.6 lb) Thus, great blue herons are roughly twice as heavy as great egrets (Ardea alba), although only slightly taller than them, but they weigh only about half as much as a large goliath heron.

Notable features of great blue herons include slaty (gray with a slight azure blue) flight feathers, red-brown thighs, and a paired red-brown and black stripe up the flanks; the neck is rusty gray, with black-and-white streaking down the front; the head is paler, with a nearly white face, and a pair of black or slate plumes runs from just above the eye to the back of the head. The feathers on the lower neck are long and plume-like; it also has plumes on the lower back at the start of the breeding season. The bill is dull yellowish, becoming orange briefly at the start of the breeding season, and the lower legs are gray, also becoming orangey at the start of the breeding season. Immature birds are duller in color, with a dull blackish-gray crown, and the flank pattern is only weakly defined; they have no plumes, and the bill is dull gray-yellow. Among standard measurements, the wing chord is 43–49.2 cm (16.9–19.4 in), the tail is 15.2–19.5 cm (6.0–7.7 in), the culmen is 12.3–15.2 cm (4.8–6.0 in), and the tarsi are 15.7–21.0 cm (6.2–8.3 in). The heron's stride is around 22 cm (8.7 in), almost in a straight line. Two of the three front toes are generally closer together. In a track, the front toes, as well as the back, often show the small talons.

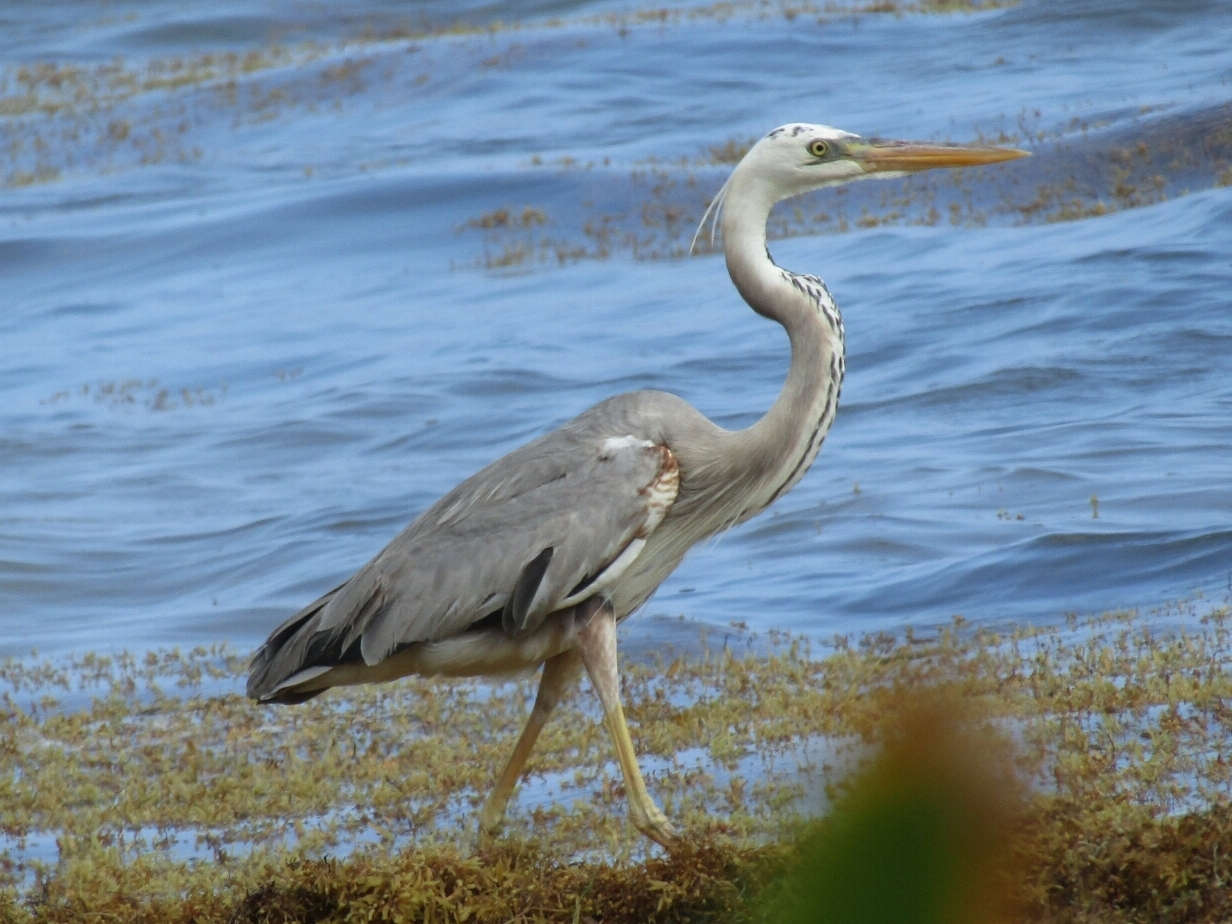
Würdemann's heron (A. h. occidentalis × wardi), in Mexico

The subspecies physically differ only slightly in size and plumage tone, with the exception of A. h. occidentalis, native to South Florida and the Caribbean region, which also has a distinct white morph, known as the great white heron (not to be confused with the great egret, for which "great white heron" was once a common name). The great white heron differs from other great blues in bill morphology, head plume length, and in having a total lack of pigment in its plumage. It averages somewhat larger than the sympatric race A. h. wardi and may be the largest race in the species. In a survey of A. h. occidentalis in Florida, males were found to average 3.02 kg (6.7 lb) and females average 2.57 kg (5.7 lb), with a range for both sexes of 2.0 to 3.4 kg (4.4 to 7.5 lb). This is mainly found near salt water, and was long thought to be a separate species. Birds intermediate between the normal morph and the white morph are known as Würdemann's heron; these birds resemble a "normal" great blue heron with a white head.

The theory that great white herons may be a separate species (A. occidentalis) from the great blue heron has again been given some support by David Sibley.

=== Similar species ===
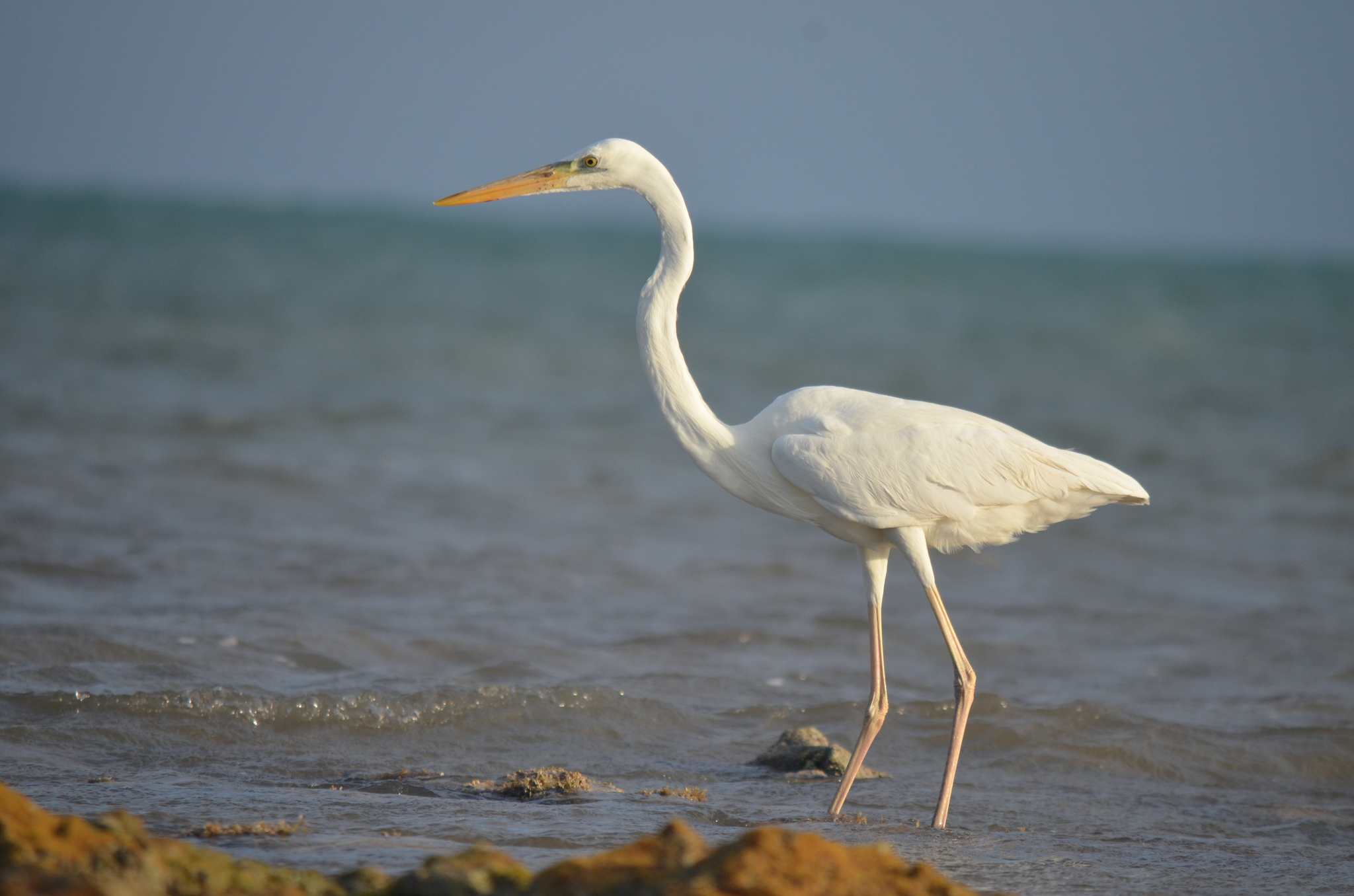
A. h. occidentalis, in Florida

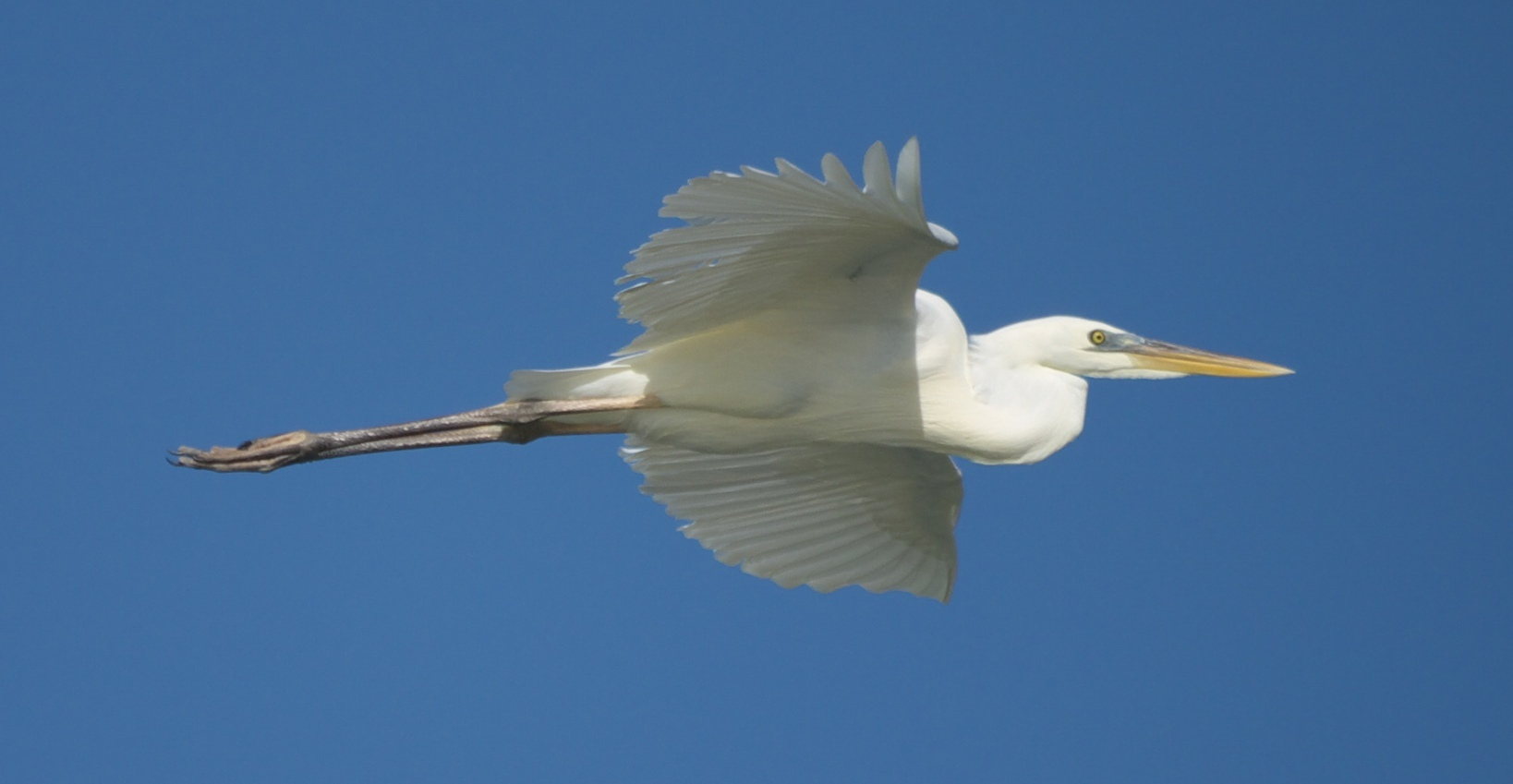
A. h. occidentalis flying in the Florida Everglades

The "great white heron" could be confused with the great egret (Ardea alba), but is larger, with yellow legs as opposed to the great egret's black legs. The reddish egret (Egretta rufescens) and little blue heron (Egretta caerulea) could be mistaken for the great blue heron, but are much smaller, and lack white on the head and yellow in the bill. At the southernmost extent of its range (e.g., Colombia and Panama), the great blue heron sometimes overlaps in range with the closely related and similarly sized cocoi heron (A. cocoi). The cocoi is distinguished by a striking white neck and solid black crown, but the duller juveniles are more easily confused. More superficially similar is the slightly smaller grey heron, which sometimes appears as a vagrant on the northern coasts of North America. The grey heron (which occupies the same ecological niche in Eurasia as the great blue heron) has very similar plumage, but has a solidly soft-gray neck. Erroneously, the great blue heron is sometimes referred to as a "crane". Herons and cranes are easiest to differentiate in flight; cranes hold their necks straight when flying, but herons bend theirs into an S shape.

== Distribution and habitat ==
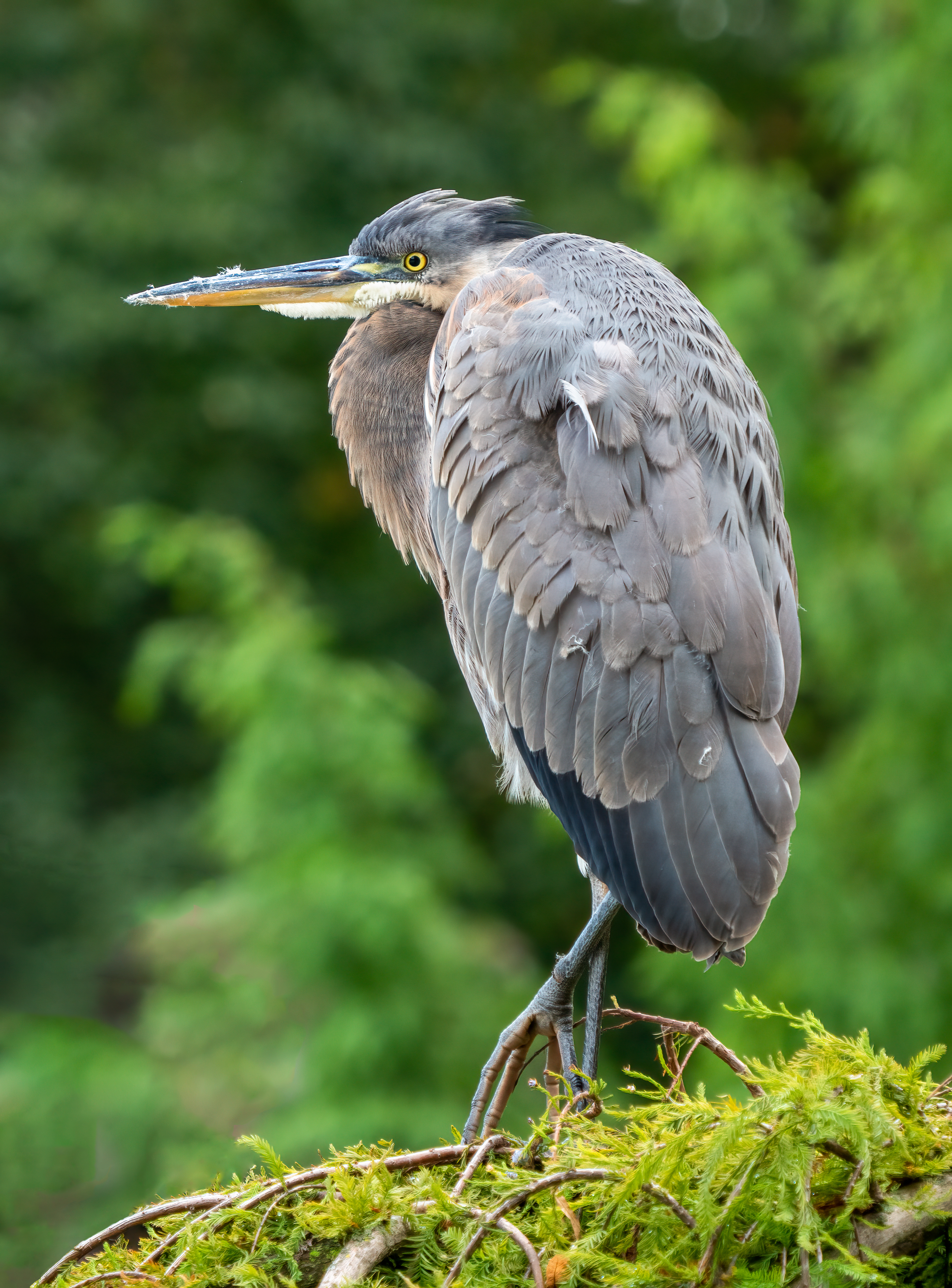
Perched in Green-Wood Cemetery, New York City

A. h. fannini, fluffing to dry its feathers at Port Townsend, Washington, US

The great blue heron is found throughout most of North America, as far north as Alaska and the southern Canadian provinces in the summer. In winter, the range extends south through Florida, Mexico, and the Caribbean to far northwestern South America (regular in Colombia and Venezuela, accidental elsewhere in South America). Birds east of the Rocky Mountains in the northern part of their range are migratory and winter in the coastal areas of the Southern United States, Central America, or northern South America. From the Southern United States southwards, and on the lower Pacific coast, they are year-round residents. However, their hardiness is such that individuals often remain through cold northern winters, as well, so long as fish-bearing waters remain unfrozen (which may be the case only in flowing water such as streams, creeks, and rivers).

The great blue heron can adapt to almost any wetland habitat in its range. It may be found in numbers in fresh and saltwater marshes, mangrove swamps, flooded meadows, lake edges, or shorelines. It is quite adaptable and may be seen in heavily developed areas as long as they hold bodies of fish-bearing water.

Great blue herons rarely venture far from bodies of water, but are occasionally seen flying over upland areas. They usually nest in trees or bushes near water's edge, often on islands (which minimizes the potential for predation) or partially isolated spots.

It has been recorded as a vagrant in England, Greenland, Hawaii, and the Azores.

The great white heron A. h. occidentalis occurs in South Florida, including Great White Heron National Wildlife Refuge in the Florida Keys, and many Caribbean islands.

== Behavior ==
=== Diet ===
The great blue heron (A. herodias) is widely recognized as an apex predator within many North American wetland systems. Its hunting behavior ranges across marshes, river edges, and shallow coastal zones, where it consumes fish, amphibians, reptiles, invertebrates, and small mammals, placing it at the top of local food webs. Adult great blue herons face relatively few natural predators, allowing them to function as dominant, top-level consumers and key indicators of ecosystem health, particularly through their sensitivity to bioaccumulated contaminants.

The primary food for the great blue heron is fish. While they can prey on various sizes of fish from small fingerlings to large adult fish, measuring 60 cm (24 in) in length and weighing around 900 g (2.0 lb), small to medium-sized fish around 10–20 cm (3.9–7.9 in) are usually preferred. Primary prey fish species is variable based on availability and abundance. In Nova Scotia, 98% of the diet was flounder. In British Columbia, the primary prey species are sticklebacks, gunnels, sculpins, and perch. California herons were found to live mostly on sculpin, bass, perch, flounder, and top smelt.

Besides fish, it is also known to feed on a wide range of prey opportunistically. Amphibians such as leopard frogs, American bullfrogs, toads, and salamanders are readily taken, as well as reptiles such as small turtles, snakes, and lizards. They can take on sizeable snakes, including water snakes 105 cm (41 in) in length. Aquatic crustaceans (such as crayfish, shrimp and crabs), grasshoppers, dragonflies, and aquatic insects are taken as supplementary prey. They also prey on small mammals including shrews, rats, ground squirrels, and moles. One study in Idaho showed that from 24 to 40% of the diet was made up of voles. Remains of muskrats (Ondatra zibethicus) and long-tailed weasels (Mustela frenata) were also found in pellets during the study. Great blue heron preying on both young and adults of eastern cottontails (Sylvilagus floridanus) has been reported. Though not often, birds such as black rails (Laterallus jamaicensis), phalaropes, American dippers (Cinclus mexicanus), pied-billed grebes (Podilymbus podiceps), and chicks of marsh terns (Chlidonias) are also taken.

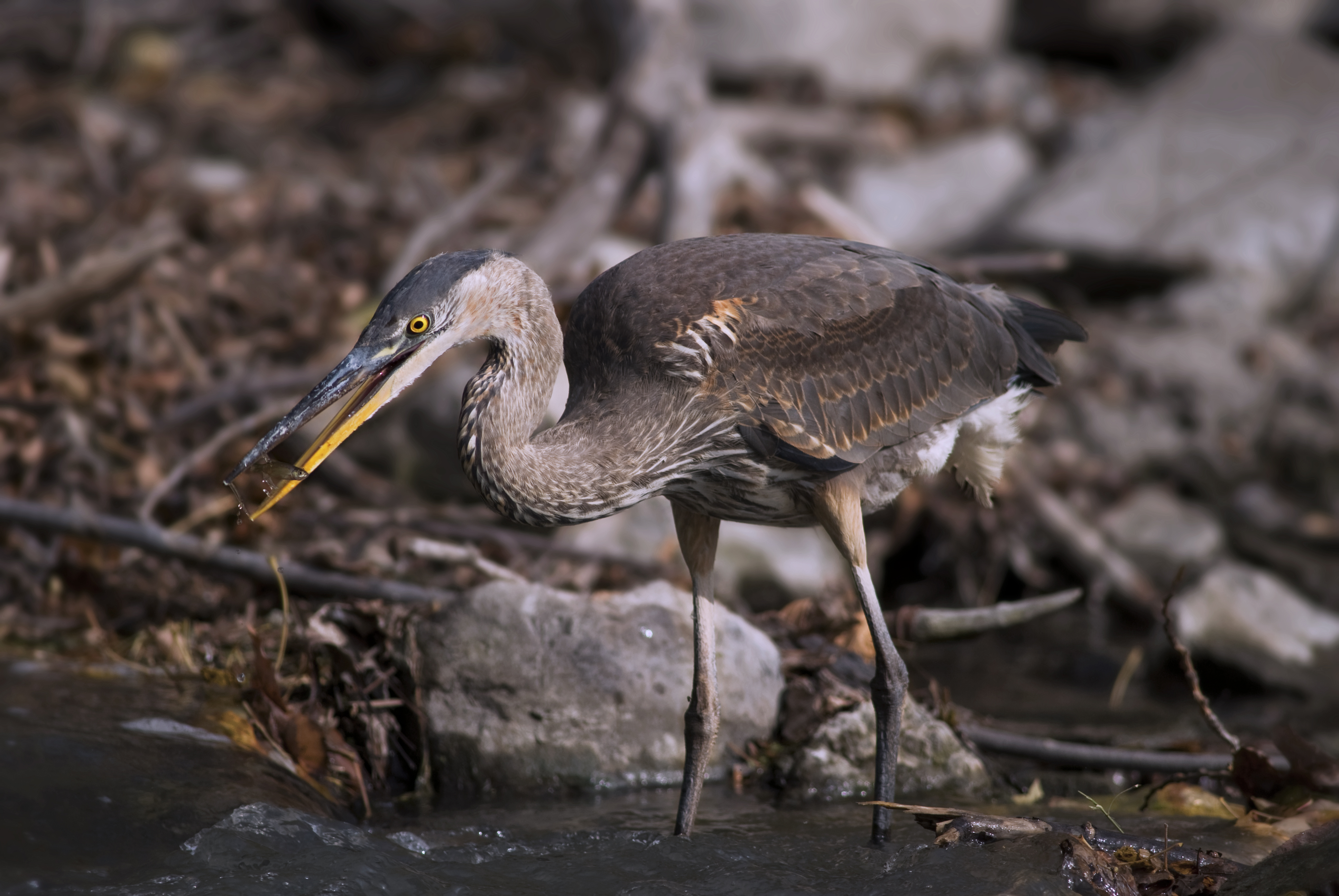
Eating a small fish

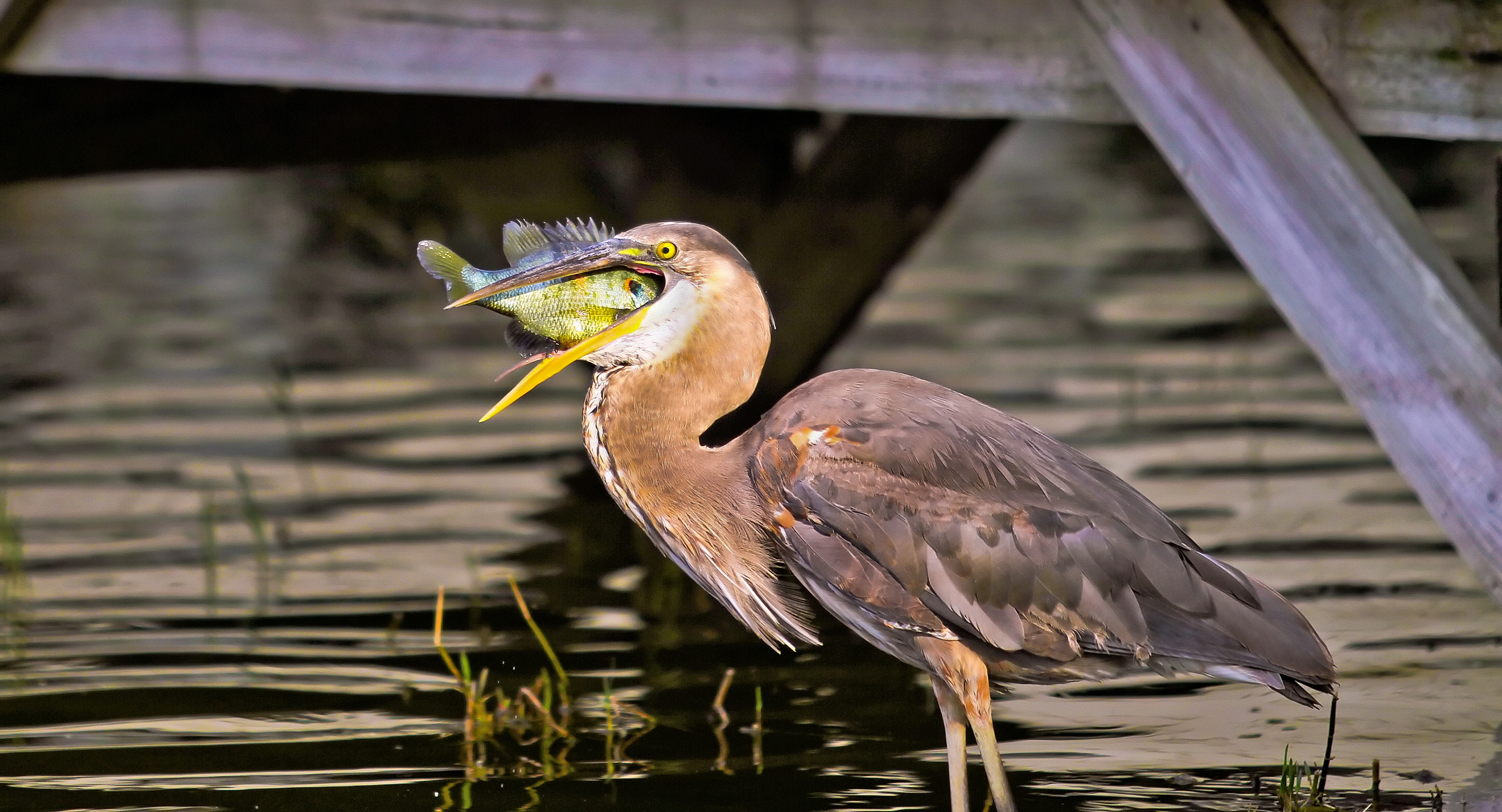
Eating a large sunfish

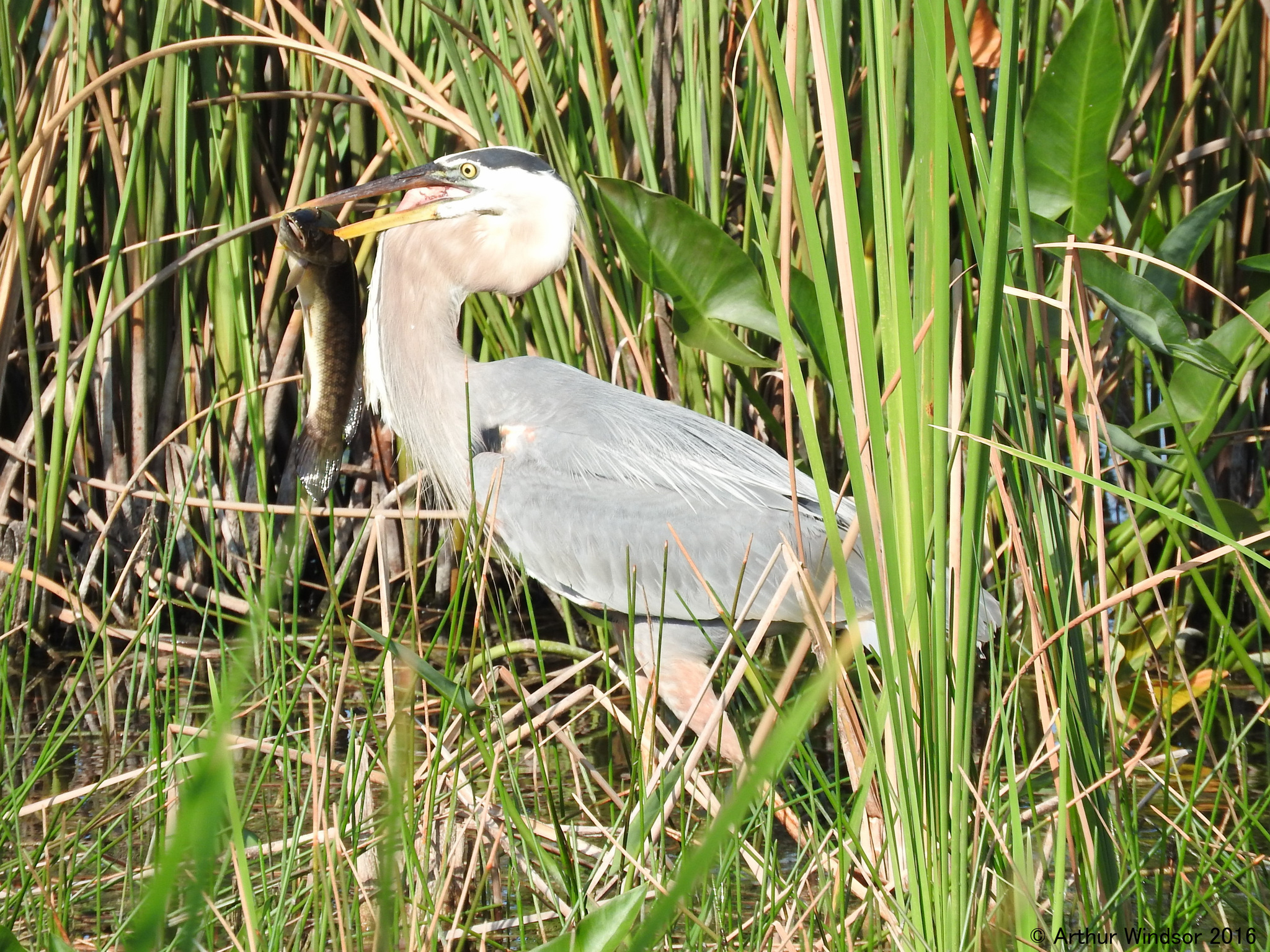
Displaying glottis exposure while eating a bowfin

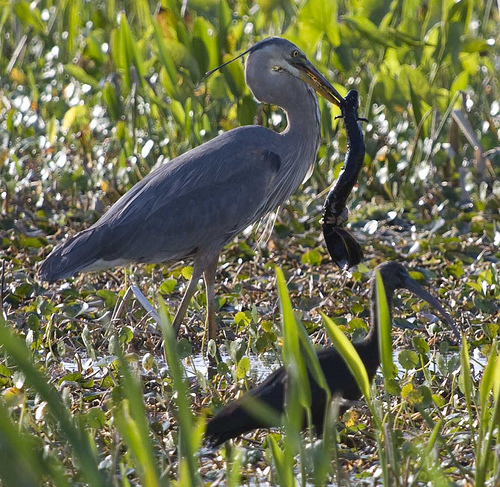
Eating a two-toed amphiuma

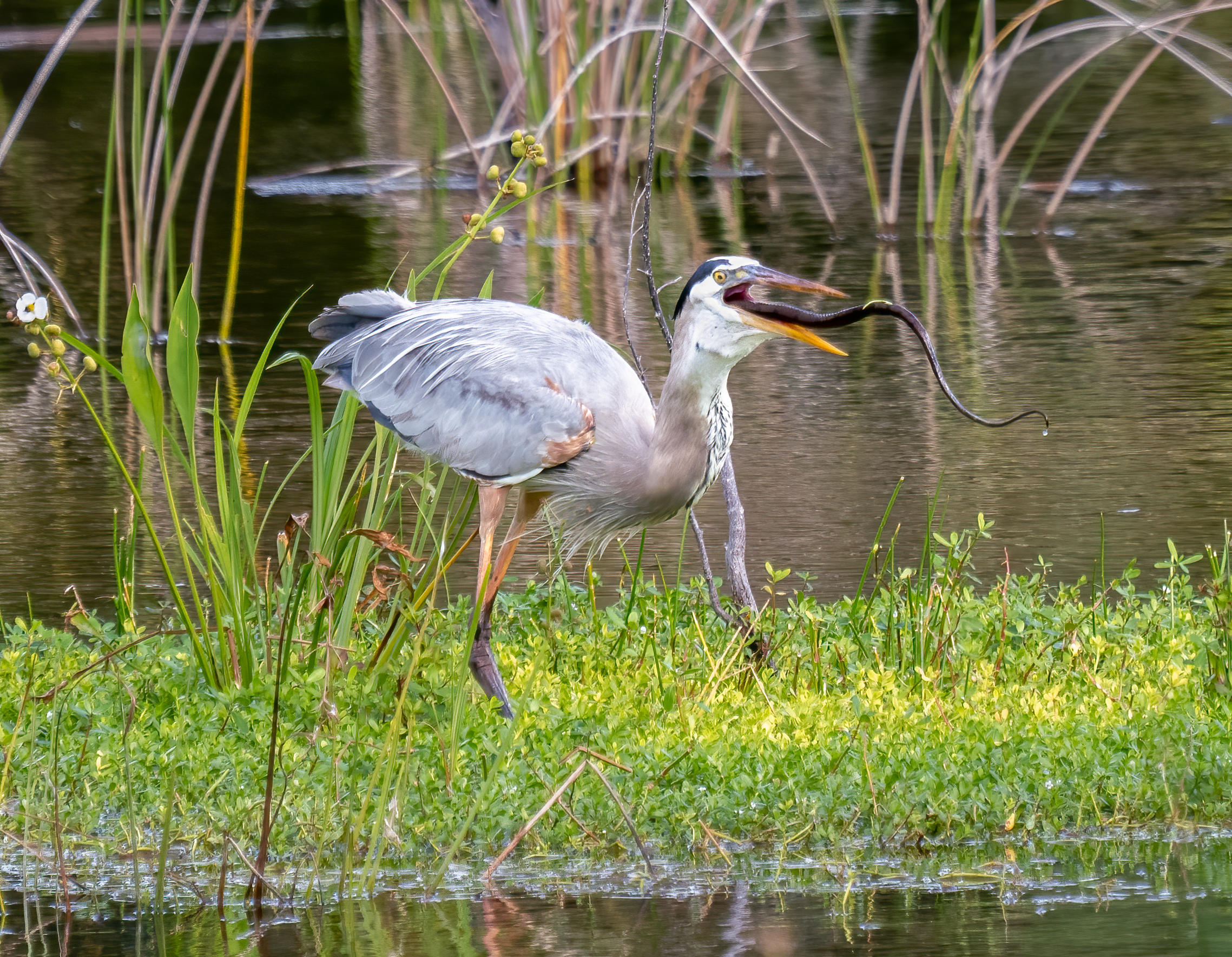
Eating a brown water snake in Florida

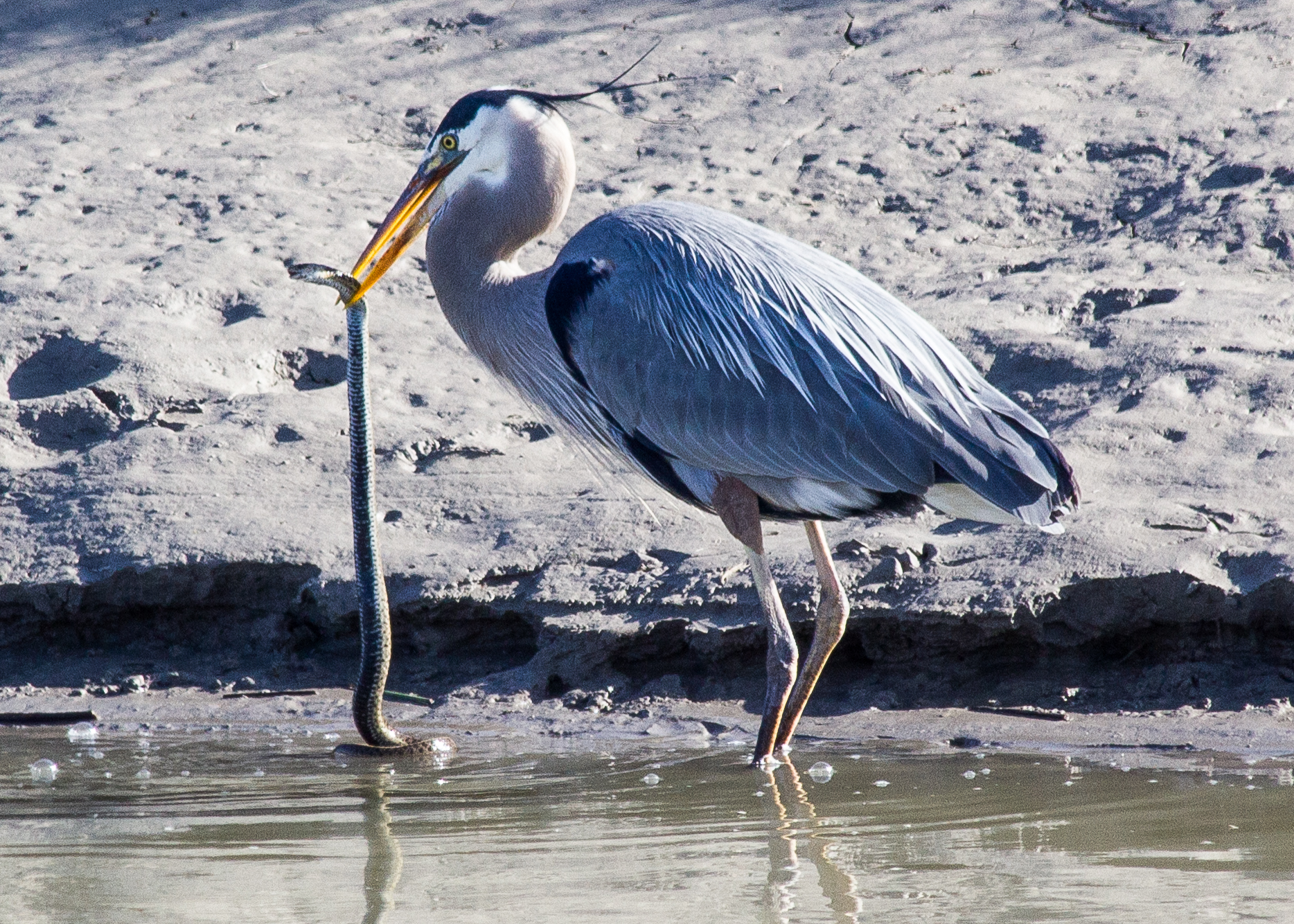
Eating a garter snake

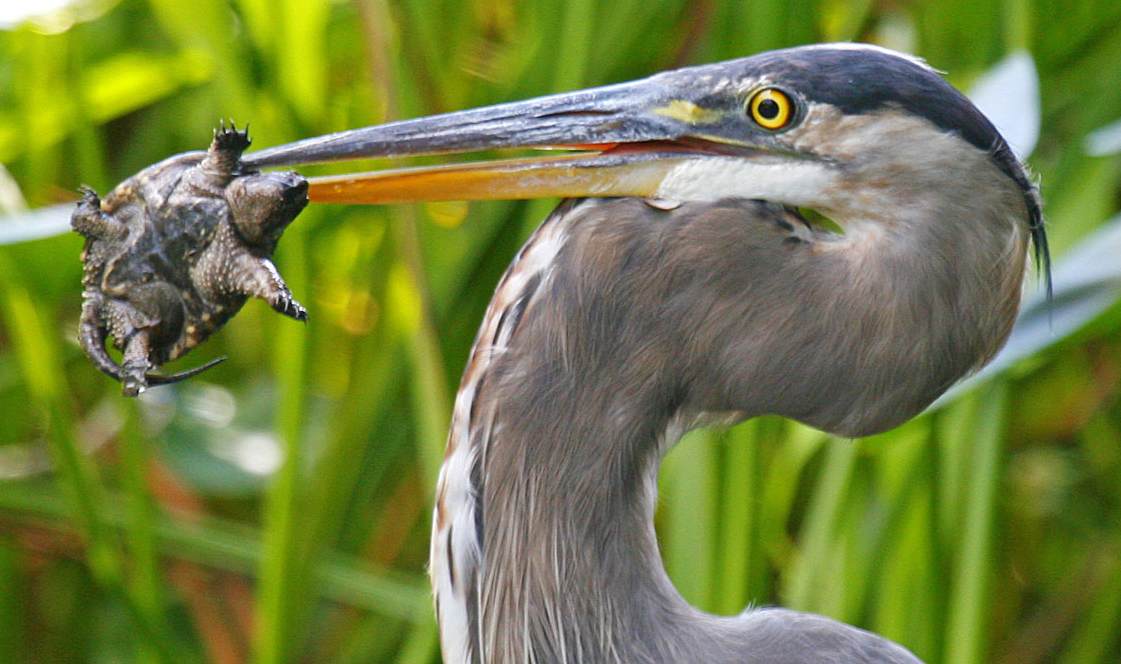
Eating a hatchling common snapping turtle

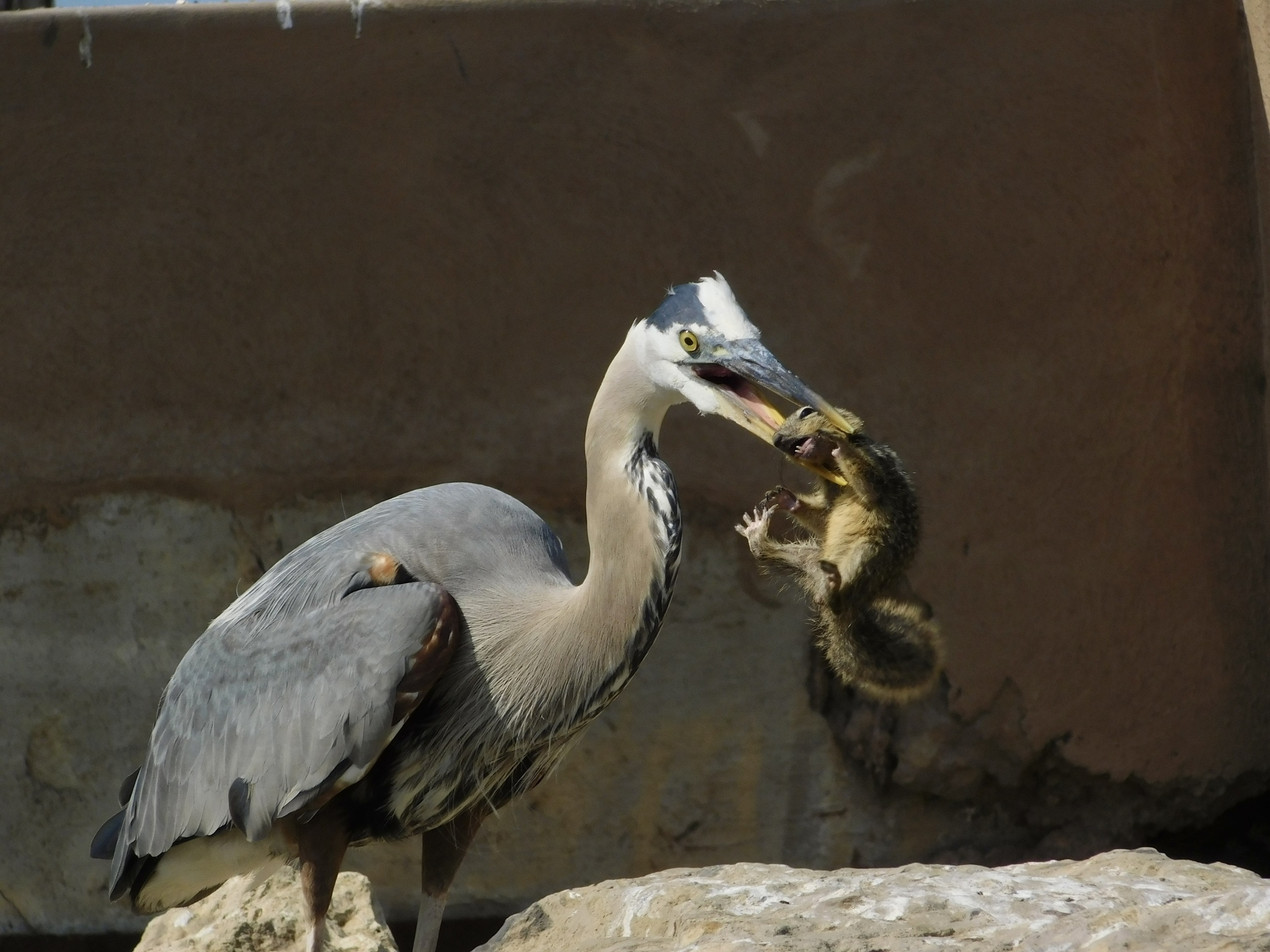
Eating a California ground squirrel

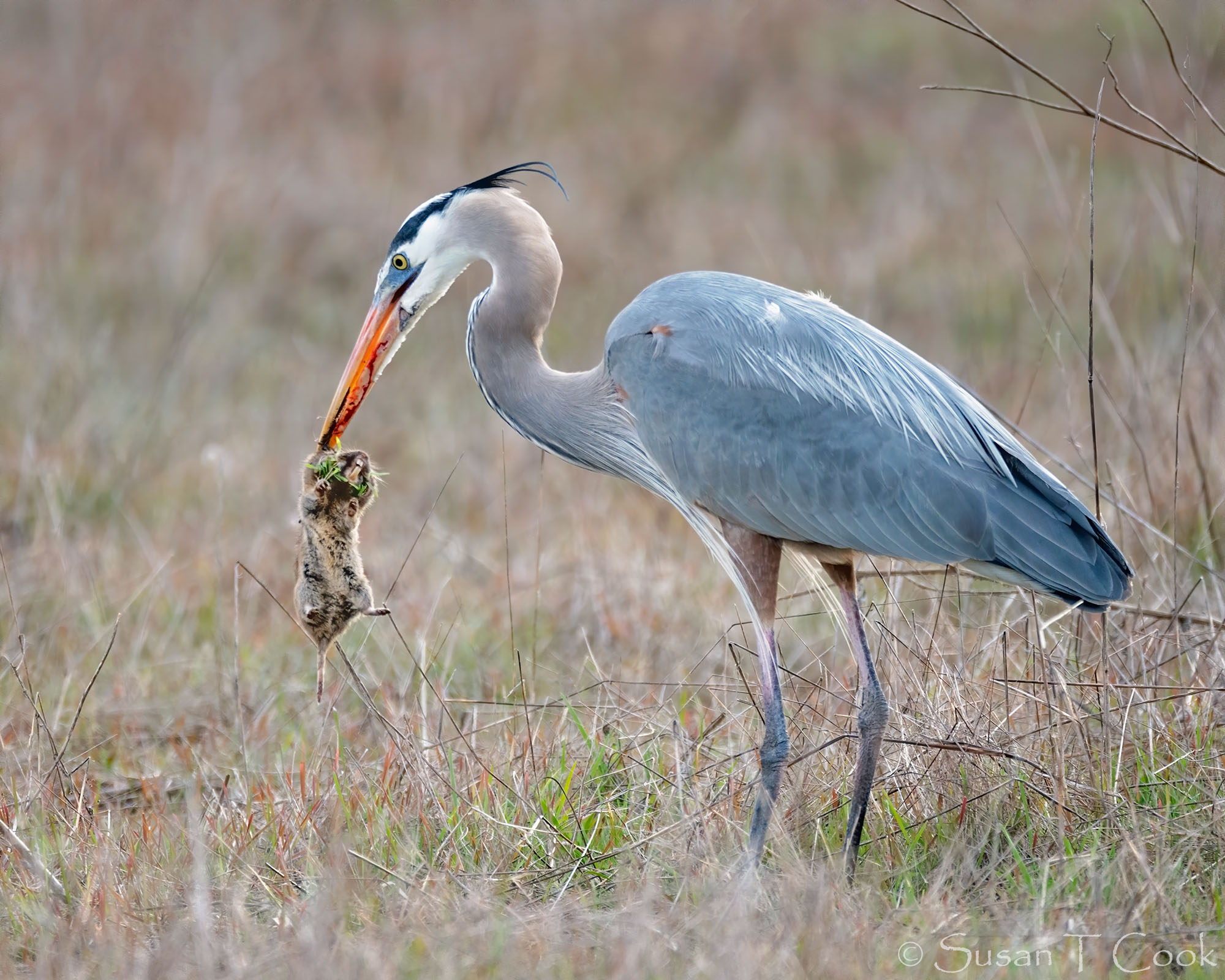
Eating a Botta's pocket gopher

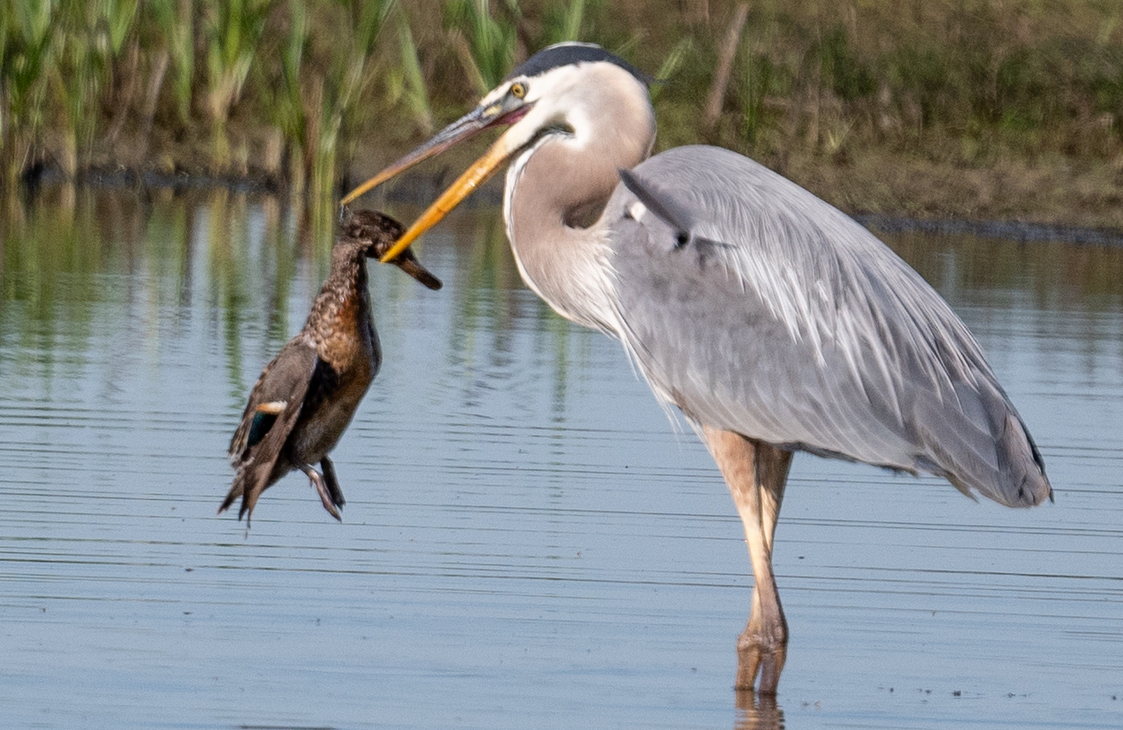
Eating a duck

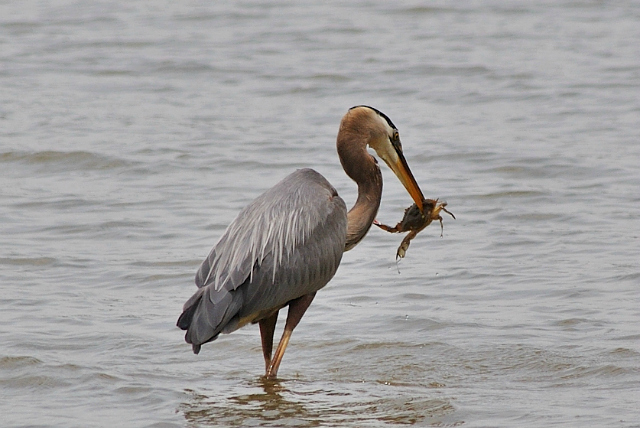
Eating a swimmer crab

Herons locate their food by sight and usually swallow it whole. They have been known to choke on prey that is too large. They are generally solitary feeders. Individuals usually forage while standing in water, but also feed in fields or drop from the air, or perch, into water. Mice are occasionally preyed on in upland areas far from the species' typical aquatic environments. Occasionally, loose flocks gather to feed, and may be beneficial since they are able to locate schools of fish more easily.

Catching fish

As large wading birds, great blue herons are capable of feeding in deeper waters, thus are able to harvest from niche areas not open to most other heron species. Typically, the great blue heron feeds in shallow waters, usually less than 50 cm (20 in) deep, or at the water's edge during both the night and the day, but especially around dawn and dusk. The most commonly employed hunting technique of the species is wading slowly with its long legs through shallow water and quickly spearing fish or frogs with its long, sharp bill. Although usually slow and deliberate in movements, the great blue heron is adaptable in its fishing methods. Feeding behaviors variably have consisted of standing in one place, probing, pecking, walking at slow speeds, moving quickly, flying short distances and alighting, hovering over the water and picking up prey, diving headfirst into the water, alighting on water feet-first, jumping from perches feet-first, and swimming or floating on the surface of the water.

=== Breeding ===
A. h. herodias is primarily migratory, while A. h. fannini is primarily not.

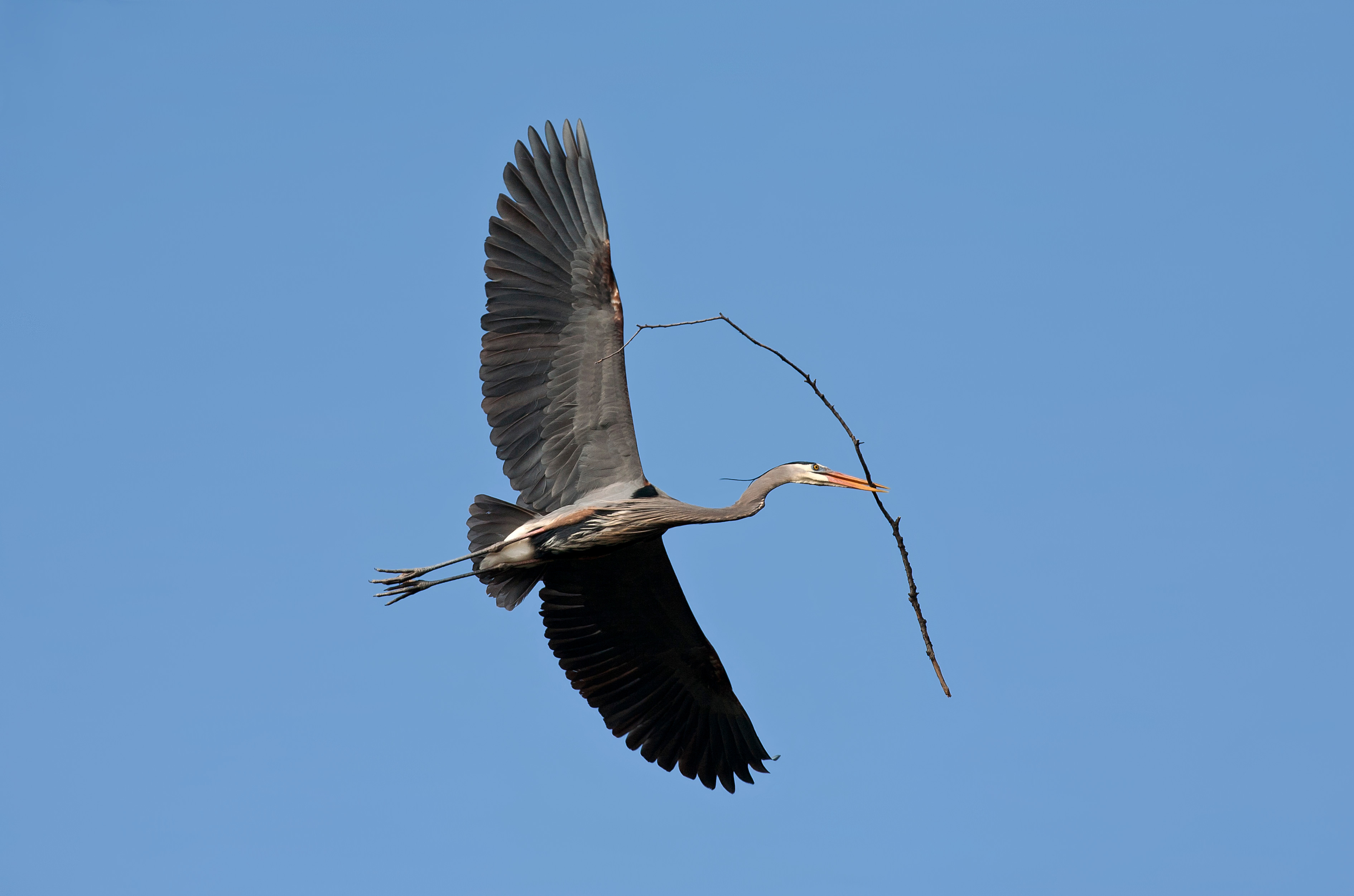
With nesting material in Illinois

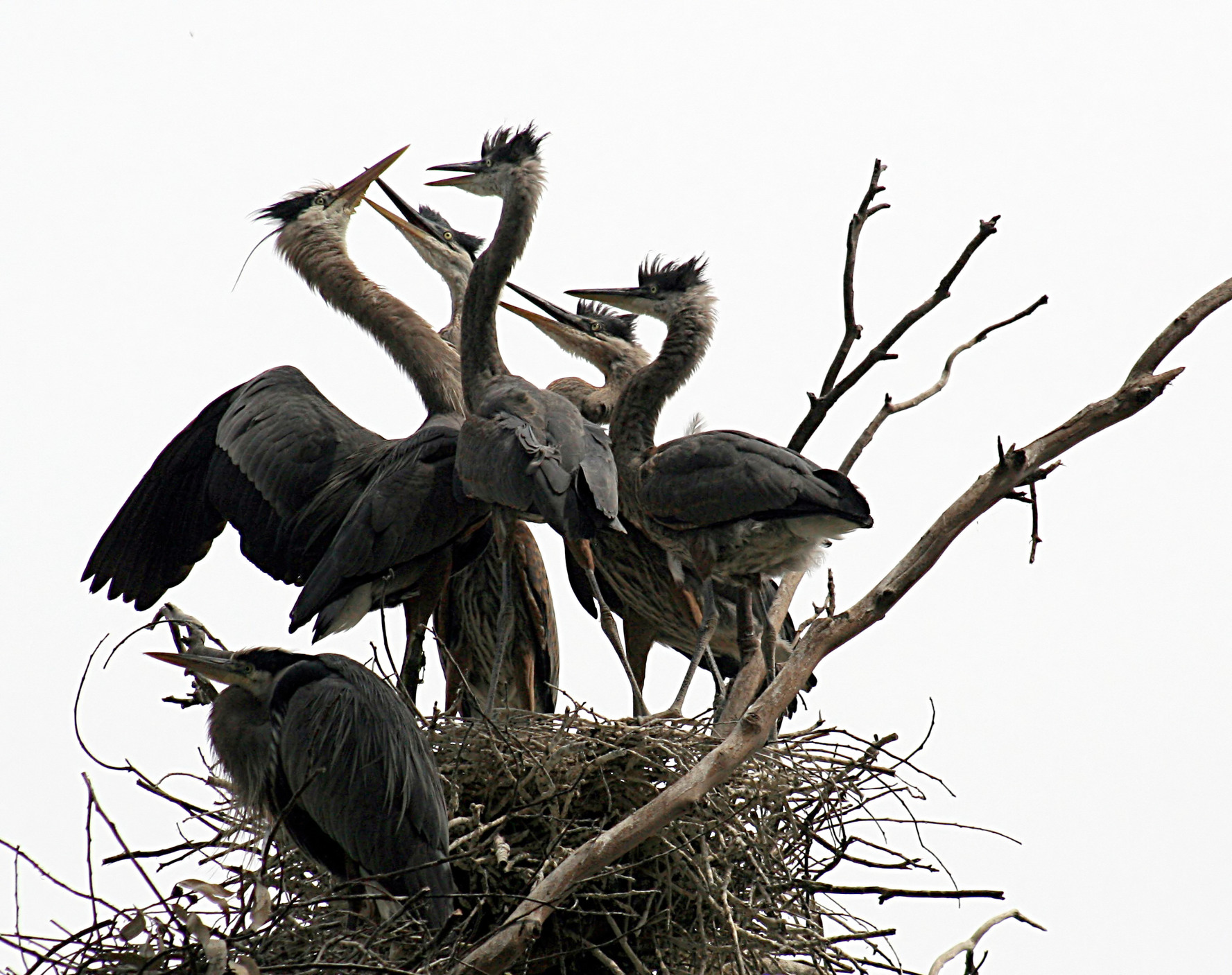
Chicks at a nest in San Francisco

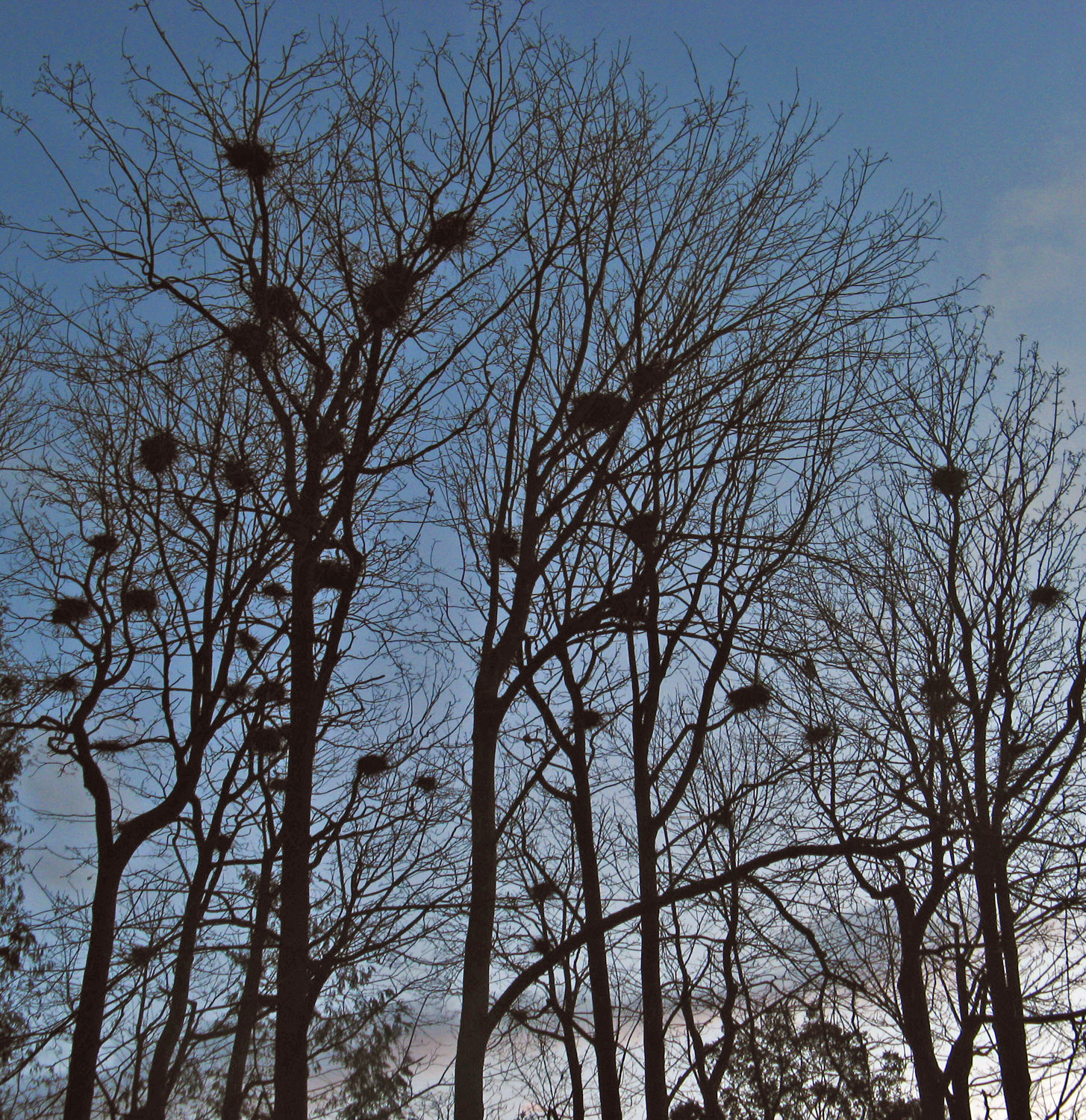
A. h. fannini heronry at Stanley Park British Columbia, Canada

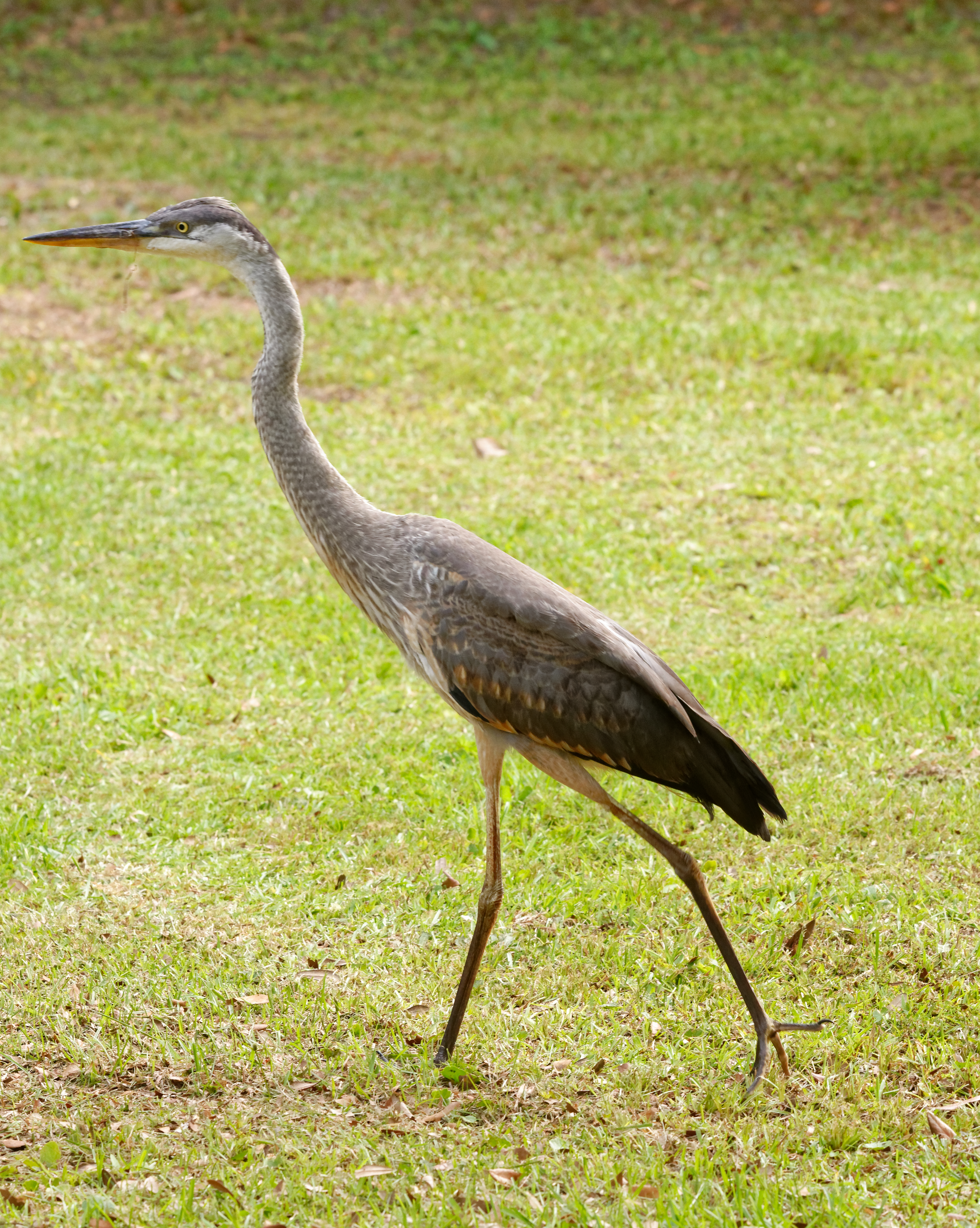
Juvenile in Georgia

This species usually breeds in colonies, in trees close to lakes or other wetlands. These colonies (called heronries) typically contain between five and 500 nests per colony, with an average around 160 nests per colony. Most heronries are located within 4 to 5 km (2.5 to 3.1 mi) of ideal feeding spots. Adults generally return to the colony site between December (in warmer climes such as California and Florida) to March (in cooler areas such as Canada). Usually, colonies include only great blue herons, though sometimes they nest alongside other species of herons.

Heronry sites are usually difficult to reach on foot (e.g., islands, trees in swamps, high branches, etc.) to protect from potential mammalian predators. Trees of any type are used when available. When not, herons may nest on the ground, sagebrush, cacti, channel markers, artificial platforms, beaver mounds, and duck blinds. Other waterbirds (especially smaller herons) and occasionally even fish- and mammal-eating raptors may nest among colonies.

Although nests are often reused for many years and herons are socially monogamous within a single breeding season, individuals usually choose new mates each year. Males arrive at colonies first and settle on nests, where they court females; most males choose a different nest each year. Great blue herons build a bulky stick nest. Nests are usually around 50 cm (20 in) across when first constructed, but can grow to more than 120 cm (47 in) in width and 90 cm (35 in) deep with repeated use and additional construction.

If the nest is abandoned or destroyed, the female may lay a replacement clutch. Reproduction is negatively affected by human disturbance, particularly during the beginning of nesting. Repeated human intrusion into nesting areas often results in nest failure, with abandonment of eggs or chicks. However, Vancouver, British Columbia's Stanley Park has had a healthy colony for some years right near its main entrance and tennis courts adjacent to English Bay and not far from Lost Lagoon. The park's colony has had as many as 183 nests.

The female lays three to six pale-blue eggs, which can measure from 50.7 to 76.5 mm (2.00 to 3.01 in) in length and 29 to 50.5 mm (1.14 to 1.99 in) in width, though the smallest eggs in the above sample may have been considered "runt eggs" too small to produce viable young. Egg weights range from 61 to 80 g (2.2 to 2.8 oz). One brood is raised each year.

First broods are laid generally in March and April. Eggs are usually laid at two-day intervals, incubated around 27 days, and hatch asynchronously over a period of several days.

Males incubate for about 10.5 hours of each day, while females usually incubate for the remainder, with eggs left without incubation for about 6 minutes of each hour. Both parents feed the young at the nest by regurgitating food. Parent birds have been shown to consume up to four times as much food when they are feeding young chicks (about 4300 kJ/day) than when laying or incubating eggs (about 1200 kJ/day).

The first chick to hatch usually becomes more experienced in food handling and aggressive interactions with siblings, so it often grows more quickly than the other chicks. By the time they are 45 days old, the young are 86% of the adult's weight.

After about 55 days at the northern edge of the range (Alberta) and 80 days at the southern edge of the range (California), young herons take their first flight. They return to the nest to be fed for about another three weeks, following adults back from foraging grounds, and they are likely to disperse gradually away from their original nest over the course of the ensuing winter.

Young herons are not as successful at fish capture as adults, as strike rates are similar, but capture rates are about half those of adults during the first two months after fledging.

=== Predation ===
Adult herons have few natural predators and are rarely preyed upon due to their large size and dagger-like bill making a full-grown heron into a formidable and "high-risk" foe to a potential predator.

Bald eagles (Haliaeetus leucocephalus) are known to attack great blue herons at every stage of their lifecycle from in the egg to adulthood. Less frequently, golden eagles (Aquila chrysaetos) and great horned owls (Bubo virginianus) are known to take adults. In one instance, during an act of attempted predation by a golden eagle, a heron was able to mortally wound the eagle, although it succumbed to injuries sustained in the fight.

A single report has that a large bobcat (Lynx rufus) managed to subdue and kill an adult great blue heron. In an exceptional case, a young Harris's hawk (Parabuteo unicinctus) killed a subadult great blue heron.

Predators of eggs and nestlings include turkey vultures (Cathartes aura), common ravens (Corvus corax), and American crows (Corvus brachyrhynchos). Red-tailed hawks (Buteo jamaicensis), American black bears (Ursus americanus), and raccoons (Procyon lotor) are known to take larger nestlings or fledglings, and in the last predator, many eggs.

When predation on an adult or chick occurs at a breeding colony, the colony can sometimes be abandoned by the other birds. The primary source of disturbance and breeding failures at heronries is human activities, mostly through human recreation or habitat destruction, as well as by egg collectors and hunters.

== In art and logos ==
John James Audubon illustrates the great blue heron in Birds of America, Second Edition (published, London 1827–1838) as Plate 211. The image was engraved and colored by Robert Havell's London workshops. The original watercolor by Audubon is in the collection of the New-York Historical Society.

The great blue heron (with its color changed to orange) is the basis of logos for the Delmarva Shorebirds minor league baseball team from the team's 1996 inception.

Great white herons feature prominently in the logo for the Major League Soccer club Inter Miami CF.
