= Islands in the Stream (novel) =

1970 posthumous novel by Ernest Hemingway

- First edition cover
- Author: Ernest Hemingway
- Cover artist: Paul Bacon
- Language: English
- Publisher: Charles Scribner's Sons
- Publication date: 1970
- Publication place: United States
- ISBN: 0-684-10243-9

Islands in the Stream (1970) is the first of the posthumously published novels of Ernest Hemingway. The book was originally intended to revive Hemingway's reputation after the negative reviews of Across the River and Into the Trees. He began writing it in 1950 and advanced greatly through 1951. The work, rough but seemingly finished, was found by Mary Hemingway among 332 works Hemingway left behind at his death. Islands in the Stream was meant to encompass three stories to illustrate different stages in the life of its main character, Thomas Hudson. The three different parts of the novel were originally to be titled "The Sea When Young", "The Sea When Absent" and "The Sea in Being". These titles were changed, however, into what are now its three acts: "Bimini", "Cuba", and "At Sea". The novel was adapted into a 1977 film of the same name.

== Background ==
Early in 1950 Hemingway started working on a "sea trilogy", to consist of three sections: "The Sea When Young" (set in Bimini); "The Sea When Absent" (set in Havana); and "The Sea in Being" (set at sea). He also wrote an unpublished story, "Sea-Chase", which his wife and editor combined with the previous stories about the islands, renamed them as Islands in the Stream, which was published in 1970.

== Plot ==
The first act, "Bimini", begins with an introduction to the character of Thomas Hudson, a typical Hemingway stoic male figure. Hudson is an American painter who finds tranquility on the island of Bimini, in the Bahamas, a far cry from his usual adventurous lifestyle. Hudson's strict routine of work is interrupted when his three sons arrive for the summer and is the setting for most of the act. Also introduced in this act is the character of Roger Davis, a writer, one of Hudson's oldest friends. Though similar to Hudson, by struggling with an unmentioned internal conflict, Davis seems to act as a more dynamic and outgoing image of Hudson's character. The act ends with Hudson receiving news of the death of his two youngest children soon after they leave the island.

"Cuba" takes place soon thereafter during the Second World War in Havana, Cuba where Hudson has just received news of his oldest (and last) son's death in the war. More cynical and introverted than before, Hudson spends his time in heavy drinking and in naval reconnaissance for the US military. For the sake of the latter occupation, he has converted his yacht into an auxiliary patrol boat.

"At Sea", the final act, follows Hudson and a team of irregulars aboard their boat as they track and pursue survivors of a sunken German U-boat along the Jardines del Rey archipelago on the northern coast of Cuba. Hudson becomes intent on finding the fleeing Germans after he finds they massacred an entire village to cover their escape. The novel ends with a shoot-out and the destruction of the Germans in one of the tidal channels surrounding Cayo Guillermo. Hudson is presumably mortally wounded in the gun battle, although the ending is slightly ambiguous. During the chase, Hudson stops questioning the deaths of his children. This chapter rings heavily with influences of Hemingway's earlier work For Whom the Bell Tolls.

== Real life influences ==
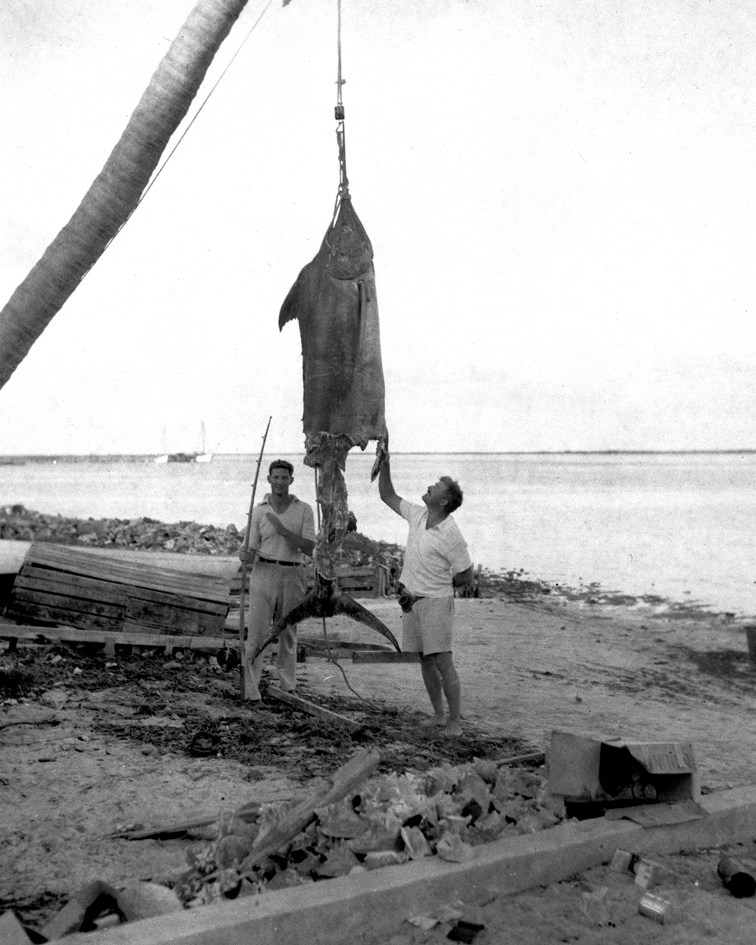
Henry Strater and Hemingway in Bimini

Hemingway used many of his real life experiences, friends, and relatives to base his characters on and to form his stories.

Henry "Mike" Strater, an American painter, spent the summer with Hemingway fishing on Bimini in 1935. He is shown in the adjacent picture standing next to what was believed to be a 1,000-pound marlin that had been half eaten by sharks while Strater landed the fish.

While on Bimini, Gerald and Sara Murphy, good friends of Hemingway, lost their young son, Baoth, to illness. Hemingway's grief for the loss is captured in letters to the Murphys.

During WWII, Hemingway hunted for U-boats aboard his boat Pilar. His boat was outfitted with communications gear provided by the US Embassy in Havana.
