= Cayo Coco =

- Resort island and village
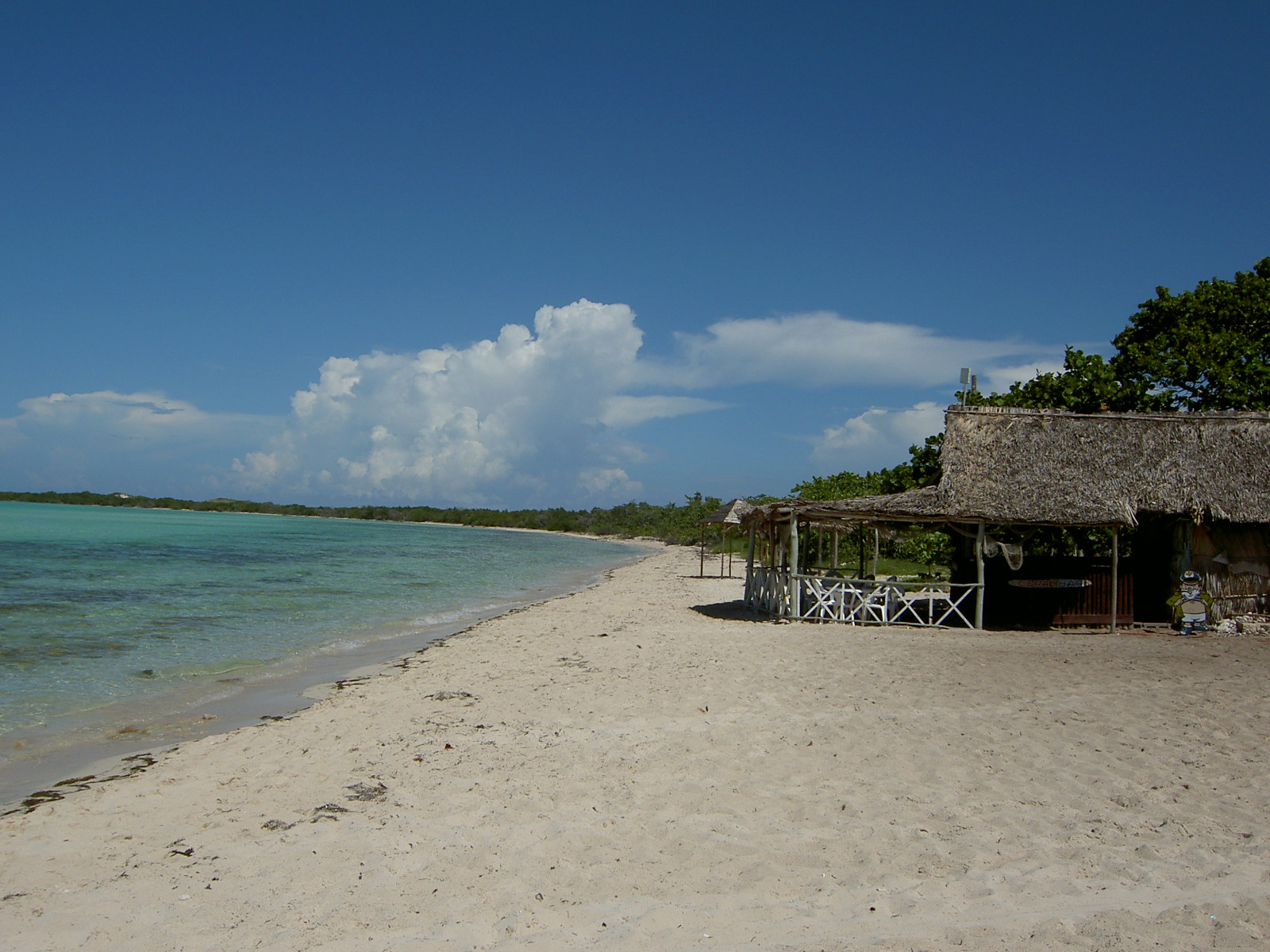
- White sand beach in Cayo Coco

- Location of Cayo Coco in Cuba
- Coordinates: 22°30′53″N 78°30′41″W
- Country: Cuba
- Province: Ciego de Ávila
- Municipality: Morón
- Elevation: 4 m (13 ft)
- Time zone: UTC-5 (EST)
- Area code: +53-43

Cayo Coco is an island on the north coast of central Cuba, known for its all-inclusive resorts. It lies within the Ciego de Ávila Province and is part of a chain of islands called Jardines del Rey ('King's Gardens'). The cay is administered by the Morón municipality, has a surface area of 370 km^{2}, and is named after the white ibis, locally called coco ('coconut') birds. The island is known for its long beaches and many resort hotels.

== History ==
Used as a hideout by buccaneers in the early colonial period, the island was home to a small settlement of fishermen and charcoal producers until 1955, when the freshwater supply was exhausted and the market for charcoal ended with the spread of electrification after the Cuban Revolution. A causeway connecting the island to the Cuban mainland opened on July 26, 1988, and resort construction began. The first resort, Guitart Cayo Coco (now the Hotel Colonial Cayo Coco), opened in 1993. The Cuban exile group Alpha 66 attacked the resort with machine guns in 1994 and 1995, but there were no injuries.

Cayo Coco and the neighboring Cayo Guillermo provided settings for Ernest Hemingway's Islands in the Stream and The Old Man and the Sea.

On September 9, 2017, Cayo Coco was hit by Hurricane Irma, causing devastation to the strip of hotels that it hosts, including the Jardines Del Rey Airport and the nearby towns of Ciego de Ávila, and Morón

== Tourism ==
The causeway linking Cayo Coco to the mainland is 27 kilometres (17 miles) long and runs across Bahía de Perros ('Bay of Dogs'). It took 16 months to build and required 3 million cubic metres (110 million cubic feet) of stone. The causeway caused concern among environmentalists because it disturbed the tidal flow, thus changing the salinity and temperature of the water. A number of gaps were created in the causeway to restore some water flow. Wild flamingos still live in the shallow waters of the bay and can often be seen from the causeway, albeit less frequently. Two short causeways link Cayo Coco to Cayo Guillermo (to the west) and Cayo Romano (to the east).

Still largely wild with swamps and scrubland populated by wild cattle, the islands boast about a dozen large international hotels currently offering approximately 5000 rooms: the Jardines del Rey project plans to eventually offer 32,000 rooms. Beaches are attractive for tourists and the enormous coral reef off the north coast attracts divers from around the world.

The island has its own international airport, the Jardines del Rey Airport (Aeropuerto Jardines del Rey; airport codes IATA: CCC, ICAO: MUCC). Since 2005, tourists can fly directly in to the airport on Cayo Coco. An earlier airport, the Cayo Coco Airport has been reclaimed as a small natural park called Parque Natural El Baga. Prior to the construction of the Jardines del Rey Airport, tourist flights for area resorts landed at the Máximo Gómez Airport (Aeropuerto Máximo Gómez; airport codes IATA: AVI, ICAO: MUCA) near Morón on the Cuban mainland.

Thomas Cook Group was a major tour operator for Cayo Coco, transporting holidaymakers from Manchester, Glasgow and London Gatwick from 2007, until its collapse in 2019.
