= Cayo Romano =

Island in Cuba

Coordinates: 22°04′00″N 77°50′00″W

Location of Cayo Romano in Cuba

Cayo Romano is an island on the northern coast of Cuba, in the province of Camagüey. It is the largest cay of the Jardines del Rey archipelago with 777 square kilometres (300 sq mi).

== Situation ==
Administratively, the south part is on Esmeralda (Camagüey Province) and the north part is on Morón (Ciego de Ávila Province) - despite that the closest municipality on Cuban mainland in Ciego de Ávila Province is Bolivia.

On the south-west side, two bays separate it from the mainland: the Bay of Jiguey and, further north, the bay of Perros.
On the north-est side it is bordered by the Old Bahama Channel and The Bahamas to 20 miles. At the northwest end is Cayo Paredon Grande, which has an old lighthouse. Cayo Megano Grande, Cayo Cruz as well as many reefs are developed on the northern shore. Cayo Coco is located to the north-west and Cayo Guajaba to the south-east.

A road runs from Cayo Coco, across Cayo Romano to Cayo Paredon Grande. However, the bridge from Cayo Coco is not suitable for all vehicles.

== Overview ==
The cay is a popular for birdwatchers but is otherwise undeveloped, compared to the intensive resort developments on nearby Cayo Coco.

== History ==
The island of Cayo Romano was transferred to American Sugar Refining Company in 1921 by Manuel A. Cadenas y Aguilera. The Cadenas family was well known in Camaguey society since the many years of upheaval and rebellion against Spain that occurred during many tumultuous years in Cuba history before 1900.
