= Jardines del Rey =

Coordinates: 22°09′N 77°53′W

Location of Jardines del Rey in Cuba

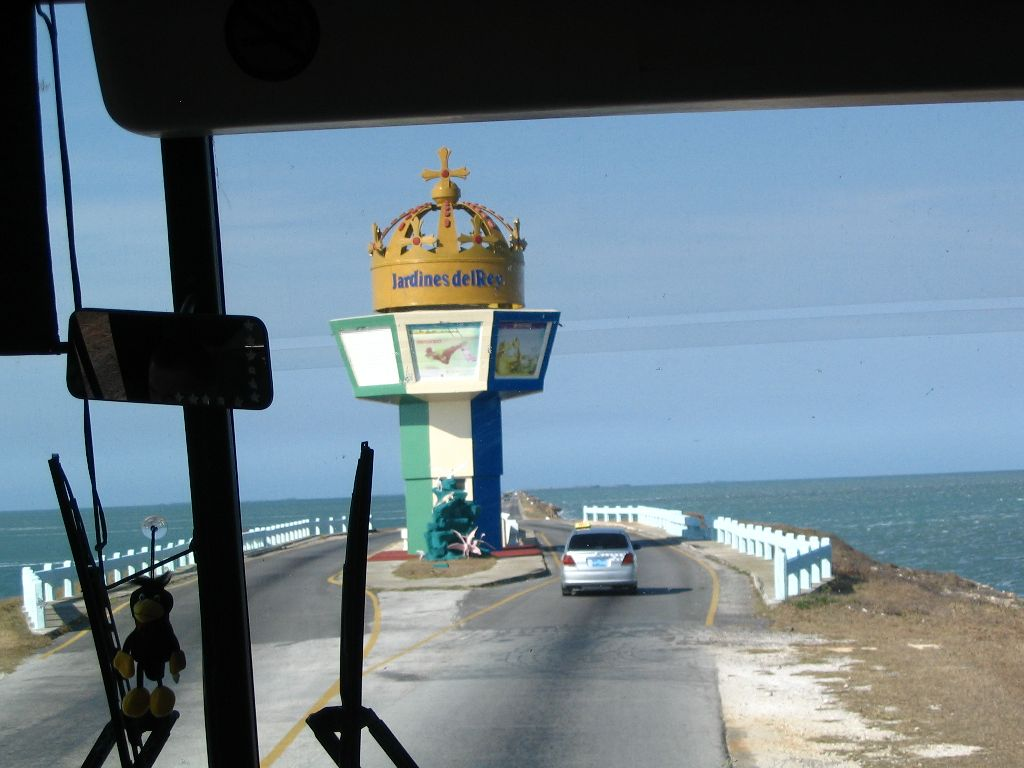
Jardines del Rey causeway entrance

Jardines del Rey (English: Gardens of the King) is an archipelago off the northern coast of Cuba, in the northern parts of the provinces of Ciego de Ávila and Camagüey.

== Overview ==
Jardines del Rey developed on the coral reef system that lines Cuba's shore, between the Atlantic Ocean, the Bay of Buena Vista and Bay of Jiguey. The reef, part of the Sabana-Camagüey Archipelago, extends for two hundred kilometres (120 miles) on a north-west to south-east direction.

Jardines del Rey Airport is located on Cayo Coco. Additional access to Cayo Coco and Cayo Guillermo is by a causeway that connects the islands to mainland Cuba.

== Cays ==
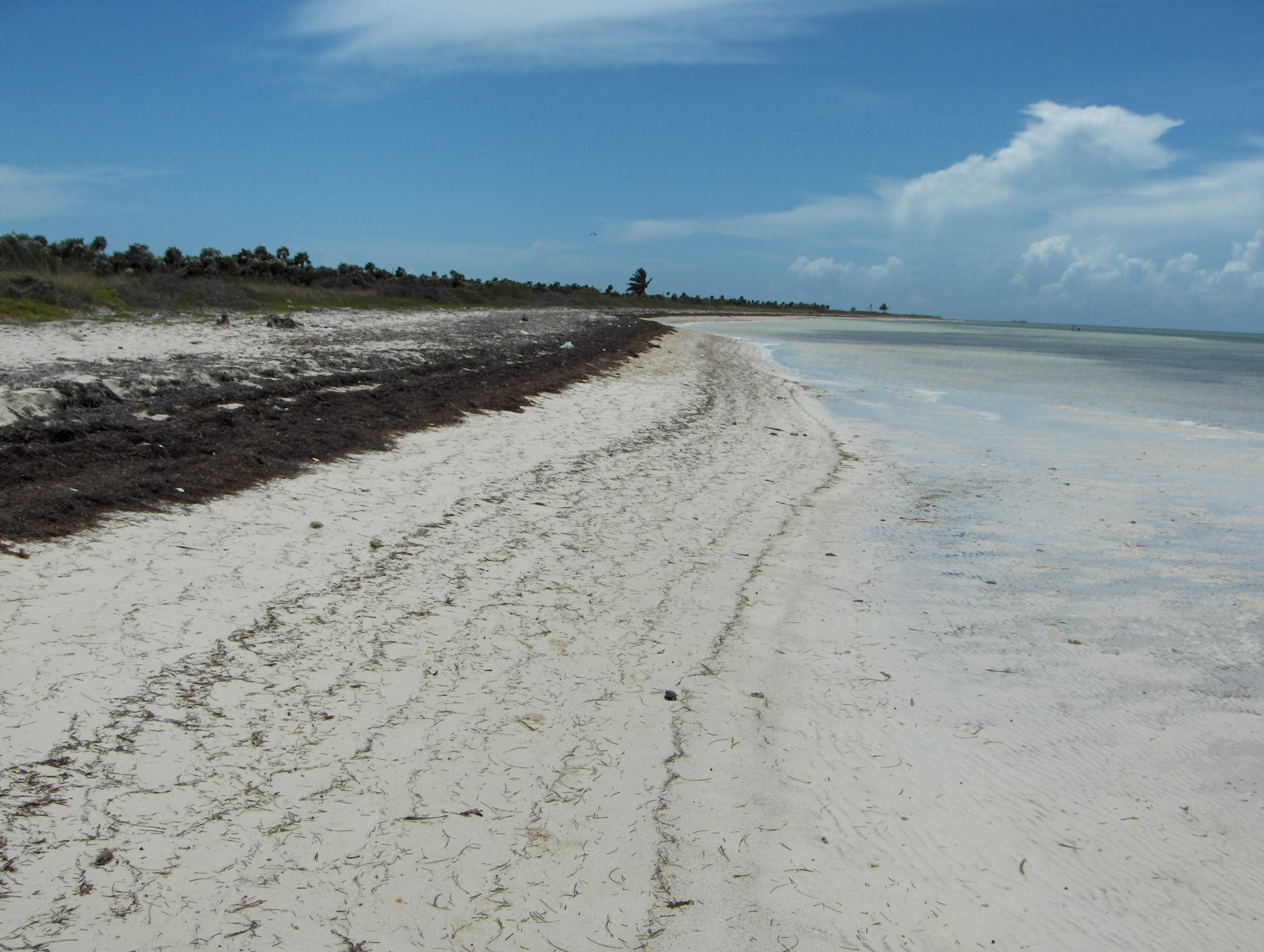
Beach in Cayo Coco

Of the many cays and islands that compose Jardines del Rey, the most important are (from north to south):

- Cayo Guillermo
- Cayo Coco
- Cayo Romano
- Cayo Guajaba
- Cayo Sabinal

Other islands include Cayo Santa María, Cayo Paredón Grande, Cayo Cruz and Cayo Confites.

== History ==
The islands were named in 1513 by Spanish conquistadors to honor their king, Ferdinand II of Aragon.

In the 16th century, the islands were refuges for corsairs and pirates. Jacques de Sores is said to have used one as a base of operations for his attacks of Santiago de Cuba in 1554. In the 19th century, they were used as a point of entry for illegal slave ships after the slave trade was officially abolished.

== El Bagá Nature Park ==
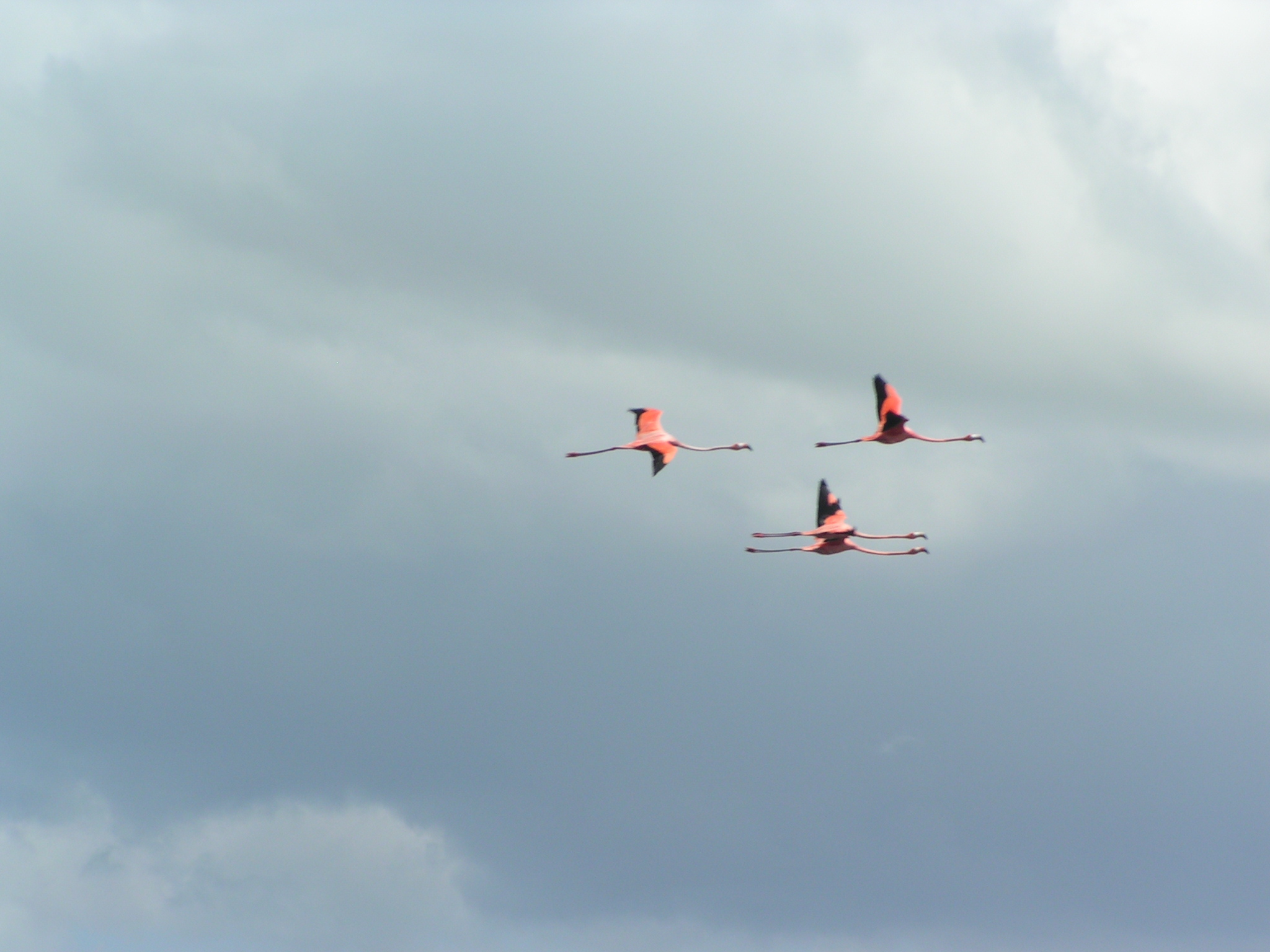
Caribbean flamingos

Bagá Nature Park (Spanish: Parque Natural El Bagá) was established on 29 December 2002 on land reclaimed from the former Cayo Coco Airport. Named for the Baga tree (árbol del pan), it extends over 69 hectares of forests and lagoons on Cayo Coco and onto neighboring cays.

The park has an interpretative centre, a walkway through a Bagá forest, a Taíno village and fauna exhibits (crocodiles, iguanas, flamingos and Cuban hutias). The archipelago is a natural habitat for Caribbean flamingos (Phoenicopterus ruber).

== See also ==
- Jardines de la Reina
