= Ciego de Ávila Province =

Province of Cuba

Ciego de Ávila Provincia de Ciego de Ávila
- Province
- Ciego de Ávila Province
- Ciego de Ávila's location in the Island of Cuba
- Country: Cuba
- Settled: March 5, 1558
- Capital: Ciego de Ávila

Area
  - Province: 6,946.90 km^{2} (2,682.21 sq mi)

Population
  - Province: 503,353
  - Density: 72.4572/km^{2} (187.663/sq mi)
  - Urban: 430,616
  - Rural: 72,737
- Time zone: UTC-5 (EST)
- HDI (2019): 0.784 high · 7th of 16
- Website: https://www.ciegodeavila.gob.cu/es/

Ciego de Ávila (Spanish pronunciation: [ˈsjeɣo ðe ˈaβila]) is one of the provinces of Cuba, and was previously part of Camagüey Province. Its capital is Ciego de Ávila, which lies on the Carretera Central (central highway), and the second city is Morón, further north.

The province was separated from Camagüey Province in 1976 by the government.

== Geography ==
Off the north coast of the province, some (cays) of the Jardines del Rey archipelago are being developed as tourist resorts, principally Cayo Coco and Cayo Guillermo. The south coast is characterised by mangroves.

Between Morón and the north coast are several lakes, including the Laguna de Leche (the Lagoon of Milk, so called for its white appearance because of large lime deposits underwater) which is the largest natural lake in Cuba.

== Economy ==
Central Ciego de Ávila is used for cattle ranching, elsewhere in the province sugar, pineapples and citrus fruit are grown. Pineapples are the staple crop, but sweet potatoes, potatoes, yuca, plantains, and bananas are also cultivated for national consumption.

== Municipalities ==
Municipality	Population (2004)	Area (km^{2})	Location	Remarks
Baraguá	32,408	728	21.68222°N 78.62444°W	includes Gaspar
Bolivia	16,612	918	22.07500°N 78.35028°W	
Chambas	39,868	769	22.19667°N 78.91306°W	
Ciego de Ávila	135,736	445	21.84806°N 78.76278°W	Provincial capital
Ciro Redondo	29,560	588	22.01889°N 78.70278°W	
Florencia	19,811	286	22.14750°N 78.96694°W	
Majagua	26,617	544	21.92444°N 78.99056°W	
Morón	60,612	615	22.11083°N 78.62778°W	includes Cayo Coco
Primero de Enero	27,813	713	21.94528°N 78.41889°W	
Venezuela	27,333	716	21.75111°N 78.77889°W	

Source: Population from 2004 Census. Area from 1976 municipal re-distribution.

== Demographics ==
In 2004, the province of Ciego de Ávila had a population of 416,370. With a total area of 6,783.13 km^{2} (2,618.98 sq mi), the province had a population density of 61.4/km^{2} (159/sq mi).
