= Cayo Guajaba =

Cay on the northern coast of Cuba

Coordinates: 21°50′48″N 77°31′28″W

Location of Cayo Guajaba in Cuba

Cayo Guajaba is a cay on the northern coast of Cuba, in the province of Camagüey.

== Geography ==
It is part of Jardines del Rey archipelago, and is located west of Cayo Sabinal, east of Cayo Romano, north of The Bay of la Gloria (Bahia de la Gloria) and borders the Atlantic Ocean to the north.

The island is administered as part of Nuevitas municipality.
