= Cayo Sabinal =

Cay on the northern coast of Cuba

Coordinates: 21°40′00″N 77°18′00″W

Location of Cayo Sabinal in Cuba

Cayo Sabinal is a cay on the northern coast of Cuba, in the municipality of Nuevitas, Camagüey Province. Has an area of 335 km².

== Geography ==
It is the southernmost island of the Jardines del Rey archipelago, and is located north of the Bay of Nuevitas (Bahia de Nuevitas), east of Cayo Guajaba and the Bay of la Gloria (Bahia de la Gloria) and borders the Atlantic Ocean to the north. It is connected to mainland Cuba west of Nuevitas.

The island is a popular tourist destination, attractions on the cay include Punta Piedra and Playa los Pinos.
