= Cayo Guillermo =

- Resort island and village
- Playa Pilar with the catamaran Ocean Voyager moored off the beach

- Location of Cayo Guillermo in Cuba
- Coordinates: 22°35′42″N 78°39′59″W
- Country: Cuba
- Province: Ciego de Ávila
- Municipality: Morón
- Elevation: 4 m (13 ft)
- Time zone: UTC-5 (EST)
- Area code: +53-43

Cayo Guillermo is a cay of the Jardines del Rey archipelago. It is located on the northern coast of Cuba, between the Bay of Dogs (Bahia de Perros) and the Atlantic Ocean. It is part of the Ciego de Ávila Province, and lies in the Morón municipality.

== History ==
Sparsely inhabited in early years by fishermen and charcoal producers, the island gained fame in the 1960s with deep sea fishermen. The first resort was built in 1993 in an era described by critics as "tourist apartheid", as Cuban citizens were not allowed on the island unless they worked at the resorts serving tourists or had other specific permission. However this restriction was lifted after 2000 and Cubans who can afford motor transport often visit Playa Pilar on the island. Many staff who work in the hotels commute from the mainland towns of Morón and Ciego de Avila.

== Tourism ==
The island is a popular tourist destination. One of the country's best beaches, the Playa Pilar (Pilar Beach) is located at the western end of Cayo Guillermo. This beach is named after Ernest Hemingway's yacht, the cabin cruiser Pilar. The island provides the setting for the climax of Hemingway's last novel Islands in the Stream

As of 2022, there are 10 hotels in Cayo Guillermo: Cayo Guillermo Resort Kempinski, Gran Muthu Imperial, Gran Muthu Rainbow Hotel, Grand Muthu Cayo Guillermo, Hotel Camino del Mar (formerly Melia Cayo Guillermo), Hotel Vigia (formerly Sol Cayo Guillermo), Iberostar Daiquiri, Iberostar Selection Playa Pilar, Islazul Villa Gregorio, and Starfish Cayo Guillermo (formerly Villa Cojimar).

== Transport ==
Access to the island is possible through the Jardines del Rey Airport (Aeropuerto Jardines del Rey) (IATA: CCC, ICAO: MUCC) as well as by means of a long causeway from mainland Cuba to Cayo Coco leading to a second shorter causeway to Cayo Guillermo, connecting the two kays.

To reach Cayo Guillermo from Havana, you can either fly to Jardines del Rey International Airport or take a private or shared transfer from the capital.
