= Primero de Enero =

First of January Violeta
- Municipality
- Primero de Enero
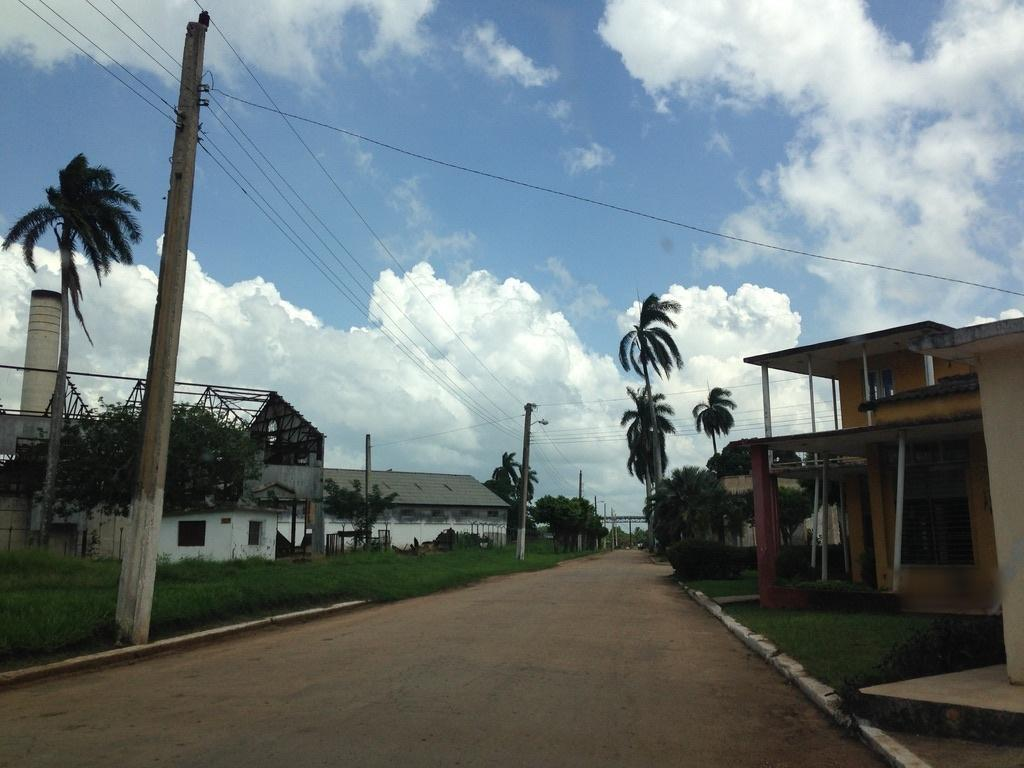
- Street in Primero de Enero

- Coat of arms

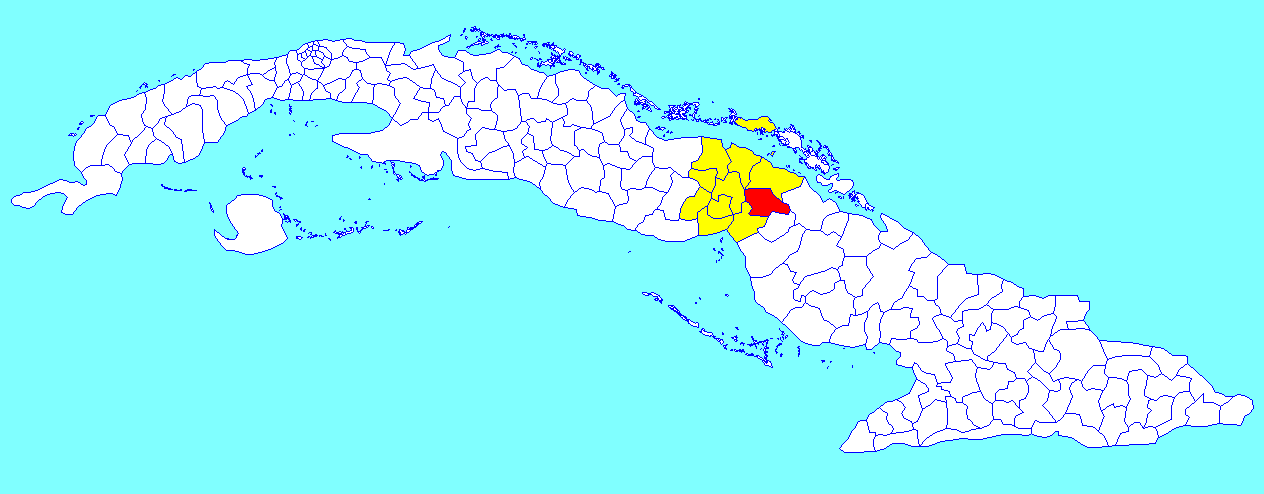
- Primero de Enero municipality (red) within Ciego de Ávila Province (yellow) and Cuba
- Coordinates: 21°56′43″N 78°25′8″W
- Country: Cuba
- Province: Ciego de Ávila

Area
  - Municipality: 713 km^{2} (275 sq mi)
- Elevation: 20 m (66 ft)

Population (2022)
  - Municipality: 22,189
  - Density: 31.1/km^{2} (80.6/sq mi)
  - Urban: 14,271
  - Rural: 7,918
- Time zone: UTC-5 (EST)
- Area code: +53-43
- Website: https://www.primerodeenero.gob.cu/es/

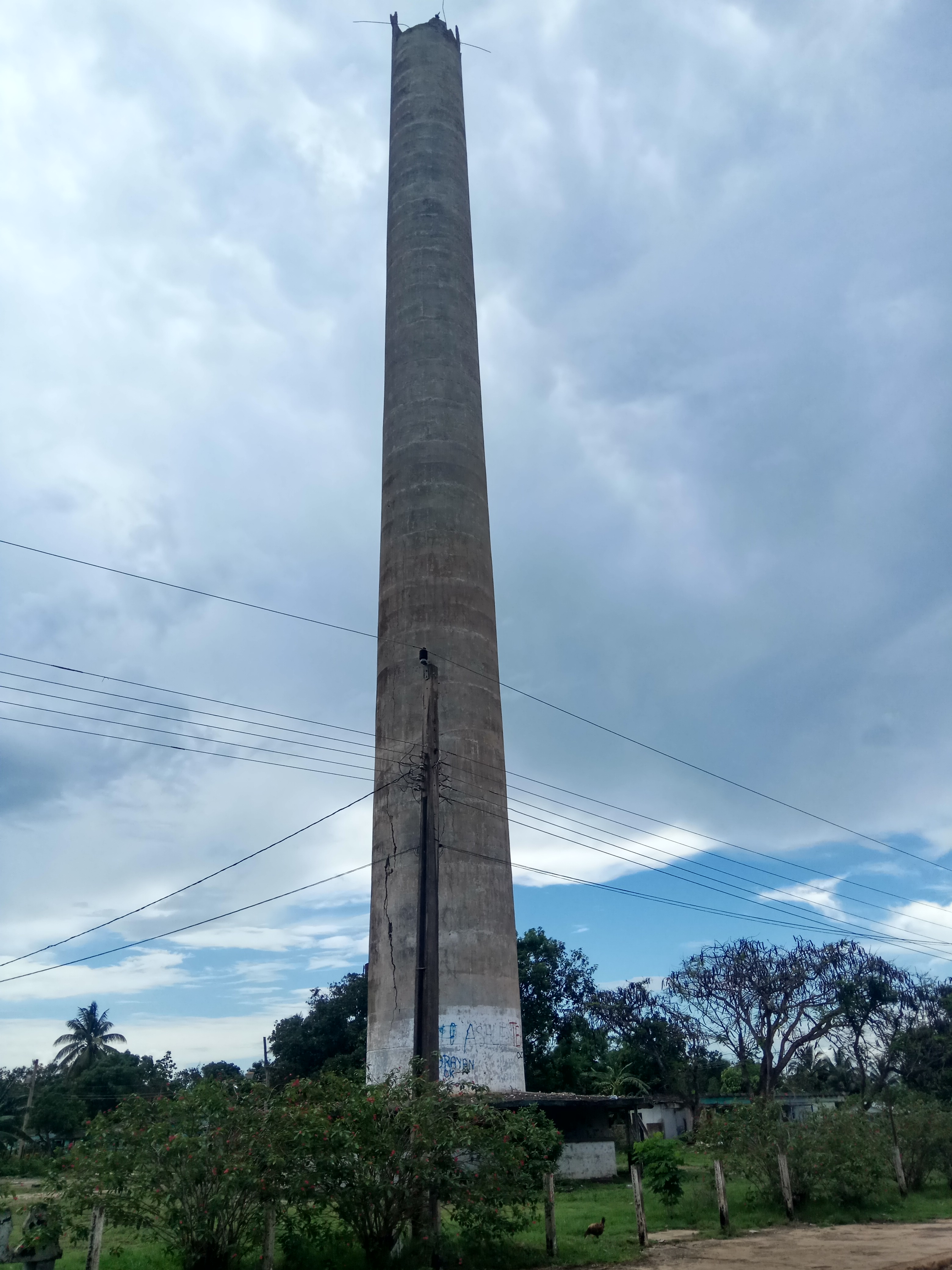
Vestigial chimney of the Velazco Central

Primero de Enero is a municipality and town in the Ciego de Ávila Province, Cuba. Originally named Violeta, its name means "1st of January" in Spanish, and is referred to the final day (in 1959) of the Cuban Revolution. It is geographically located in the Northeast of the Province of Ciego de Ávila and has an extension of 712.7 km.

It was founded in 1918, as a sugar mill, named Violeta, and renamed with its current name after the triumph of the Cuban Revolution on January 1, 1959.

== Geography ==
Located in the eastern side of its province, it borders with the municipalities of Esmeralda, Céspedes (both in Camagüey Province), Baraguá, Ciro Redondo, Morón (30 km far) and Bolivia. The town is 57 km far from Ciego de Ávila, 73 from Florida, and 112 from Camagüey. The municipal territory includes the villages as Corea, El Canario, La Victoria, Pablo, Pedro Ballester, San Martín and Velasco.

== Demographics ==
In 2022, the municipality of Primero de Enero had a population of 22,189. With a total area of 713 km^{2} (275 sq mi), it has a population density of 39.0/km^{2} (101/sq mi).

== See also ==
- Primero de Enero Municipal Museum
- Municipalities of Cuba
- List of cities in Cuba
