= List of museums in Cuba =

This is a list of museums in Cuba.

== By province ==
=== Artemisa ===
- Alquízar Municipal Museum
- Artemisa Municipal Museum
- Bahía Honda Municipal Museum
- Bauta Municipal Museum
- Candelaria Municipal Museum
- Guanajay Municipal Museum
- Güira de Melena Municipal Museum
- Mariel Municipal Museum
- San Antonio de los Baños Municipal Museum
- San Cristóbal Municipal Museum

=== Camagüey ===
- Carlos Manuel de Céspedes Municipal Museum
- Esmeralda Municipal Museum
- Guáimaro Municipal Museum
- Florida Municipal Museum
- Jimaguayú Municipal Museum
- Minas Municipal Museum
- Najasa Municipal Museum
- Nuevitas Municipal Museum
- Santa Cruz del Sur Municipal Museum
- Sibanicú Municipal Museum
- Sierra de Cubitas Municipal Museum
- Vertientes Municipal Museum

=== Ciego de Ávila ===
- Baraguá Municipal Museum
- Bolivia Municipal Museum
- Chambas Municipal Museum
- Ciro Redondo Municipal Museum
- Florencia Municipal Museum
- Majagua Municipal Museum
- Morón Municipal Museum
- Primero de Enero Municipal Museum
- Venezuela Municipal Museum

=== Granma ===
- Guisa Municipal Museum

=== Havana ===
- Museo de los Orishas y las regiliginoes afrocubanas (Afrocuban culture and religions museum, Guanabacoa, Havana)
- Casa de Africa (Africa House, Havana)
- Castillo de la Real Fuerza (Havana)
- Colon Cemetery, Havana (Havana)
- Museo de la Danza (Havana)
- The Capitol Building
- Depósito del Automóvil (Havana)
- Finca Vigía (Havana)
- Granma (yacht), Havana
- José Martí Memorial (Havana)
- La Cabaña (Havana)
- Museo del Aire (Havana)
- Museo Nacional de Historia Natural de Cuba, Havana
- Museo Nacional de Bellas Artes de La Habana; National Museum of Fine Arts (Havana, Cuba)
- Museum of Decorative Arts, El Vedado, Havana
- Museum of the Revolution (Havana, Cuba)
- Napoleonic Museum (Havana)
- Palacio de los Capitanes Generales (Havana)
- Taquechel Pharmacy Museum (Havana)
- The Ludwig Foundation of Cuba, Havana
- Museo del Ron Havana Club (Rum Museum, Havana)
- Museo de la Ciudad (Museum of the City of Havana)
- Museo del Chocolate (Chocolate Museum), Havana
- Museo del Naipe (Museum of playing cards, Havana)
- Museo de Arte Colonial
- National Museum of Contemporary Ceramics
- Fusterlandia
- Museo postal cubano (Filatelia), Havana

=== Isla de la Juventud ===
- Presidio Modelo

=== Matanzas ===
- Museo Histórico Provincial de Matanzas
- Galería Pedro Esquerré Museum, Provincial Council of Fine Arts,

=== Mayabeque ===
- Batabanó Municipal Museum
- Bejucal Municipal Museum
- Güines Municipal Museum
- Jaruco Municipal Museum
- Madruga Municipal Museum
- Melena del Sur Municipal Museum
- Nueva Paz Municipal Museum
- Quivicán Municipal Museum
- San José de las Lajas Municipal Museum
- San Nicolás de Bari Municipal Museum
- Santa Cruz del Norte Municipal Museum

=== Pinar del Río ===
- Consolación del Sur Municipal Museum
- Guane Municipal Museum
- La Palma Municipal Museum
- Los Palacios Municipal Museum
- Mantua Municipal Museum
- Minas de Matahambre Municipal Museum
- San Juan y Martínez Municipal Museum
- San Luis Municipal Museum
- Sandino Municipal Museum
- Viñales Municipal Museum

=== Santiago de Cuba ===
- Museo Abel Santamaría Cuadrado
- Museo Municipal Emilio Bacardí Moreau

=== Villa Clara ===
- Che Guevara Mausoleum
- El Mejunje
- Tren Blindado
- Villa Clara Provincial Museum

== See also ==
- List of museums
- Tourism in Cuba
- Culture of Cuba
