= Majagua, Cuba =

Majagua
- Municipality
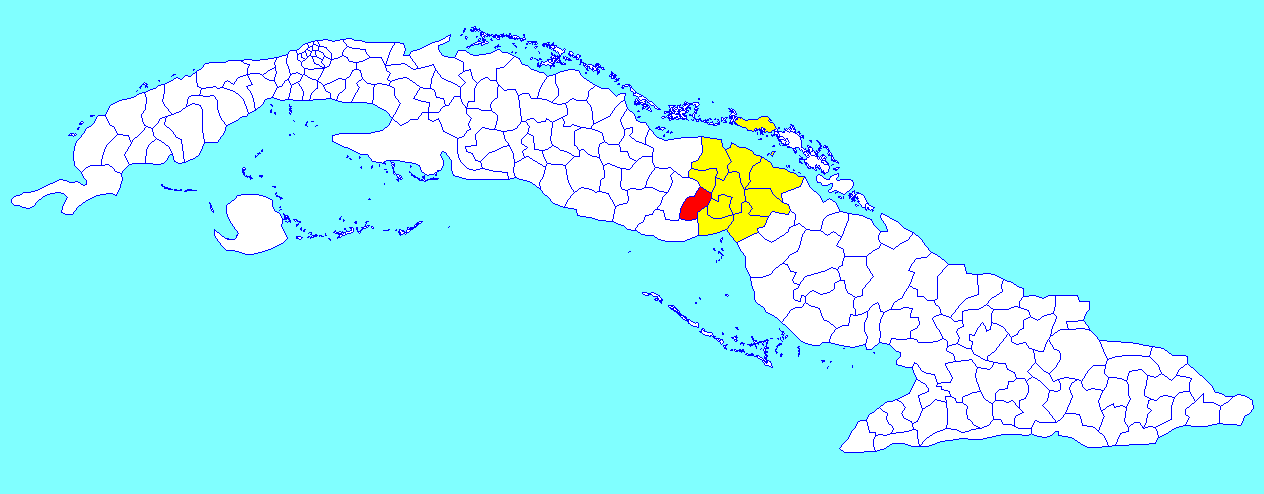
- Majagua municipality (red) within Ciego de Ávila Province (yellow) and Cuba
- Coordinates: 21°55′28″N 78°59′26″W
- Country: Cuba
- Province: Ciego de Ávila

Government
  - President: Humberto Fleitas Portal

Area
  - Total: 544 km^{2} (210 sq mi)
- Elevation: 110 m (360 ft)

Population (2022)
  - Total: 24,987
  - Density: 45.9/km^{2} (119/sq mi)
- Time zone: UTC-5 (EST)
- Area code: +53-43
- Website: https://www.majagua.gob.cu/es/

Majagua (Spanish pronunciation: [maˈxaɣwa]) is a municipality and town in the Ciego de Ávila Province of Cuba. It is located in the eastern part of the province and is bisected by the Carretera Central highway.

== Geography ==
The Majagua municipality is located in the southwest of the province of Ciego de Ávila and has the following boundaries:

- North: Florencia and Ciro Redondo municipalities.
- South: La Sierpe municipality.
- East: Ciego de Ávila and Venezuela municipalities.
- West: Jatibonico municipality.

Due to its location to the west of the Trocha and being a kind of border region between the former provinces of Camagüey and Santa Clara, the territory acquired Hispanic cultural traits due to settlements of islanders who devoted themselves to the cultivation of minor fruits, tobacco, and livestock, which establishes certain differences with the part of the province located to the east of the Trocha where there is a greater influence of Caribbean immigrants.

=== Extent ===
The territory covers a total area of 541.5 km², with an elongated shape from NE to SW forming an irregular polygon. The extreme points are located at the intersection of the Majagua-Marroquí road to the North and in the southern portion at a place located 2.5 km SW of the Ramblasón track in Cayo. In addition to the main town, the municipality includes the villages of Guayacanes, Jicotea, Las Coloradas, and La Calera.

In Continental Europe, there are five countries smaller than this territory: Andorra, Liechtenstein, Monaco, San Marino, and the Vatican City.

== Climate ==
Among the main climatic characteristics, the existence of seasonal and calm winds can be observed, as well as continental influence in winter. The climate is tropical savanna (AW) influenced by Arctic air masses in winter.

During the summer, weather variability is associated with disturbances typical of the tropical circulation zone, such as wave disturbances in the east (E) flow and cyclones.

The annual sum of sunlight hours ranges from 2700 to 2900. March and April are the months with the highest occurrence of clear days.

The average annual temperature ranges between 25 °C and 26 °C. The special regularity of this variable is notable in the months of July and August, with average values of 28 °C.

The trend of average temperatures dropping below 25 °C from November to May is related to the arrival of cold polar air. This explains the fact that minimum temperatures may vary in different years, while maximum temperatures vary relatively little, because the warm air masses that arrive from equatorial regions have approximately the same temperatures as the local air.

From 1916 to 1989, 1080 cold fronts arrived in the municipality (73% of those that arrived in the country). The causes of the temporality and irregularity of rainfall occurrences are due to the influence of atmospheric processes, conditioned by the general circulation system and the irregular warming of the earth's surface and coastal waters.

The spatial distribution of precipitation data from 1931 shows that it rains more in the northern half (N), where the annual average reaches magnitudes between 1400 and 1600mm, while in the south, they are of the order of 1200-1400 millimeters.

The cause of this distribution lies in the fact that the northern portion of Majagua is within the central convective belt, as well as the convergence of the Trade winds and northern breezes with the breezes coming from the south.

In the vicinity of the main town, the average rainfall is 135mm, with the highest occurring in June (249mm) and the lowest in December (17mm). Summer rains are generally convective (thunderstorms) and are greater with the passage of eastward waves and tropical cyclones. In winter, they are frontal, related to the passage of cold fronts and occasionally in the form of low-pressure systems.

The average annual relative humidity at 7:00 a.m. is 95%, and at 1:00 p.m., it is 60%.

When observing the relatively stable landscape around us, it is difficult to think that in the past, everything was different. Over geological time, changes have occurred that have led to renewed geographical features.

It seems that in the Eocene, the area of the municipality was covered by sea waters and deposition predominated. The substrate of the territory where Majagua is currently located was formed more than 42,000,000 years ago, and these rocks lie under sedimentary coverings at various depths.

After the Upper Eocene, portions emerge, such as flat areas, in the Miocene everything is submerged again under water level, to emerge again in the Pleistocene.

The relief is characterized by being flat, to the north in the foothills of the Cordillera, Las Villas is higher and undulating, its height above sea level is 180 meters.

In the vicinity of the town of Majagua, the altitude is 100 meters, and in the southern portion only 5 meters above sea level. The slope inclination to the south ranges from 30 to 50.

== Demographics ==
In 2022, the municipality of Majagua had a population of 24,987. With a total area of 544 km^{2} (210 sq mi), it has a population density of 46/km^{2} (120/sq mi).

== Economy ==
This population is dedicated to agricultural and livestock activities and industry, the most important being fruit and vegetable canning, textile manufacturing, and oil drilling. It has water and sewer services, telephone services, electrical services, radio and television stations. There is a bus and train terminal. In addition to a Service Company that provides services to electrical modules, refrigerators, in short, all practical household items.

Within the established commercial facilities in the town, there are two stores for industrial products, which are El cañón and Playa Girón, where Market of Industrial Articles (MAI) products are offered, as well as offers from various special programs such as the Baby and Child store, the sale of uniforms, as well as the offer of various products for the disabled.

== Education ==
Majagua has two Primary Schools, Sergio Pérez Castillo and 5 de septiembre, with a capacity for 900 students. The average number of semi-boarding students is 588. Both have sports areas, a school library, computer laboratory, orchard, etc. There are two Kindergarten Circles, Amanecer de América and Bebé, with a capacity for 290 children.

A Vocational School, called Movimiento Juvenil, with a capacity for 175 students, which has a sports area, library, orchard, and computer laboratory.

A Polytechnic for vocational high school education, as well as, in the current 2010-2011 school year, Pre-university studies were initiated.

There is an ESBU: Simón Reyes Hernández, with a capacity for 500 students. Within it, students can enjoy the existing sports area, as well as the school library, computer laboratory, a mini-orchard, and a rustic area. There is also a Pioneers' school where small courses are offered for the interest circles of primary and secondary school children, such as nursing, veterinary, gastronomy, food, etc.

== Culture ==
Within the town of Majagua, there are different recreational and cultural centers such as the Museum, which has its doors open every day from Monday to Friday from 9:00 AM to 5:00 PM, providing its visitors with a historical overview of the first inhabitants who settled in this locality, as well as several exhibition rooms, some permanent and others that are mounted depending on commemorative dates.

There is a Municipal Library that provides its services throughout the week, as well as the Video Room, the Bookstore, where books by national and international writers are sold.

The House of Culture, which offers workshops for amateurs in plastic arts, music, and dance, and also as a cultural medium, there is the Snow Cinema and the Amphitheater.

== Health ==
This town has a polyclinic, which provides services such as dentistry, prosthetics, X-rays, electrocardiograms, an intensive care unit, a clinical laboratory, and a nursing home, among others.

The town also has 15 medical offices, a pharmacy, a green medicine laboratory, and a hygiene center, for the epidemiological control of the territory.

There is a Maternity Home, as well as a physiotherapy room, a grandparents' house, which has a capacity for 25 grandparents.

== Sports ==
This town has a basketball court, a handball court, a gymnasium, and a baseball stadium.

== See also ==
- Majagua Municipal Museum
- Municipalities of Cuba
- List of cities in Cuba
