= Gaspar, Cuba =

Gaspar
- Town
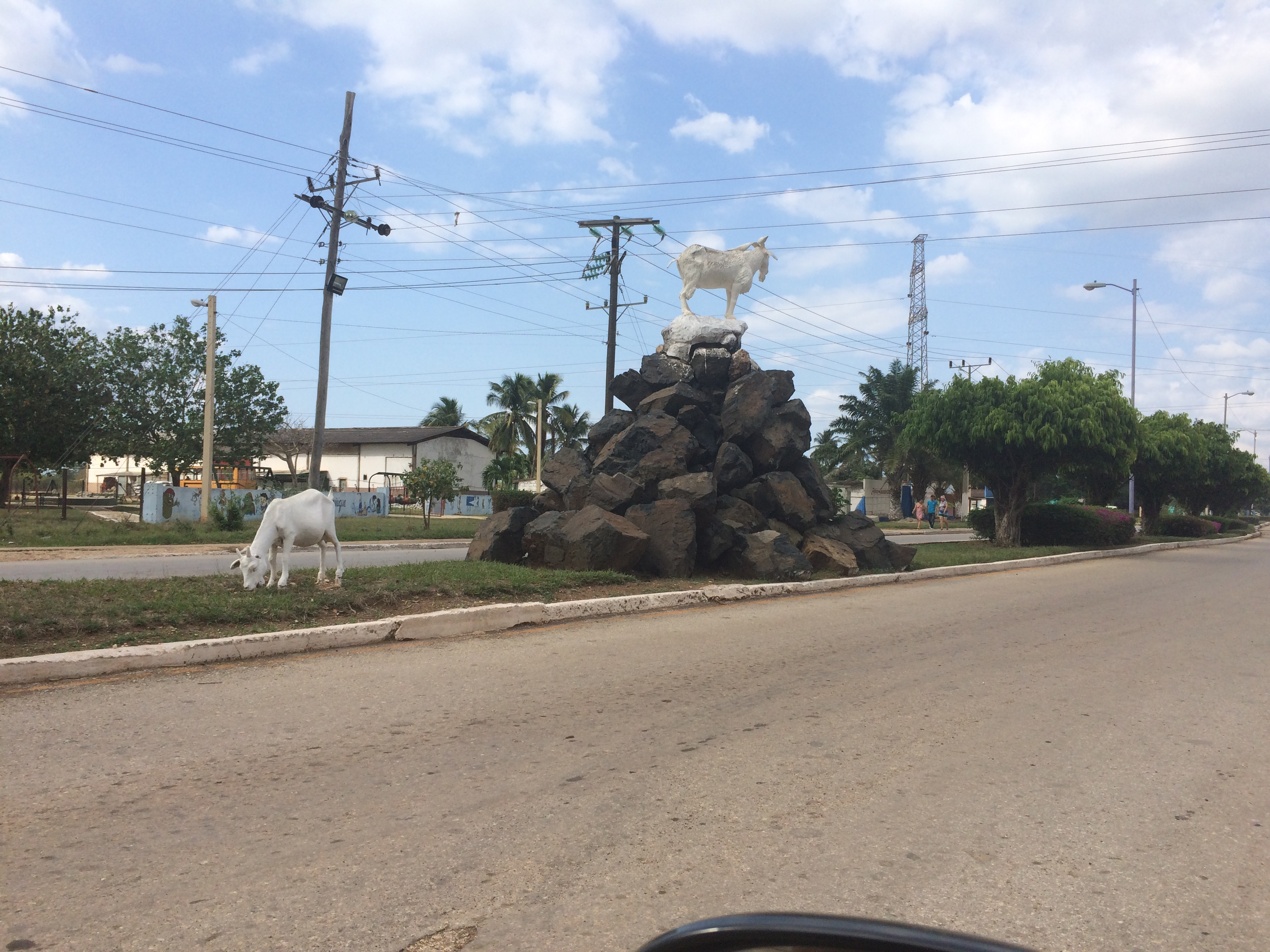
- Goat's Monument

- Location in Cuba
- Coordinates: 21°44′16″N 78°32′56″W
- Country: Cuba
- Province: Ciego de Ávila
- Municipality: Baraguá
- Elevation: 5 m (16 ft)

Population (2011)
  - Total: 7,445
- Time zone: UTC-05:00 (CST)
  - Summer (DST): UTC-04:00 (CDT)
- Area code: +53-43

Gaspar is a small town located in the central region of Cuba, in the province of Ciego de Ávila. It is the administrative seat of the municipality of Baraguá and has a population (2011) of 7,445.

== History ==
The town was officially found on 8 March 1916. It is mainly known as "el pueblo de los chivos" meaning the town of goats due to its great goat production the inhabitants tend to breed and own.

== Geography ==
Gaspar is located 26 kilometers (16 mi) west of the city of Ciego de Ávila (the provincial capital) and 20 kilometers (12 mi) east of the Province of Camagüey border, at an elevation of 20 meters (66 ft).

To get to Gaspar one must pass by "El Centro" which is the most exact middle point of Cuba (located on Carretera Central). This road runs from the far east point of Cuba all the way to the West of Cuba; passing by every province. Gaspar is located 1 kilometer south of the Highway and "El Centro", and along the Cuban Railway track between Ciego de Ávila and Céspedes.

== See also ==
- Municipalities of Cuba
- List of cities in Cuba
