= San Luis, Pinar del Río =

San Luis
- Municipality
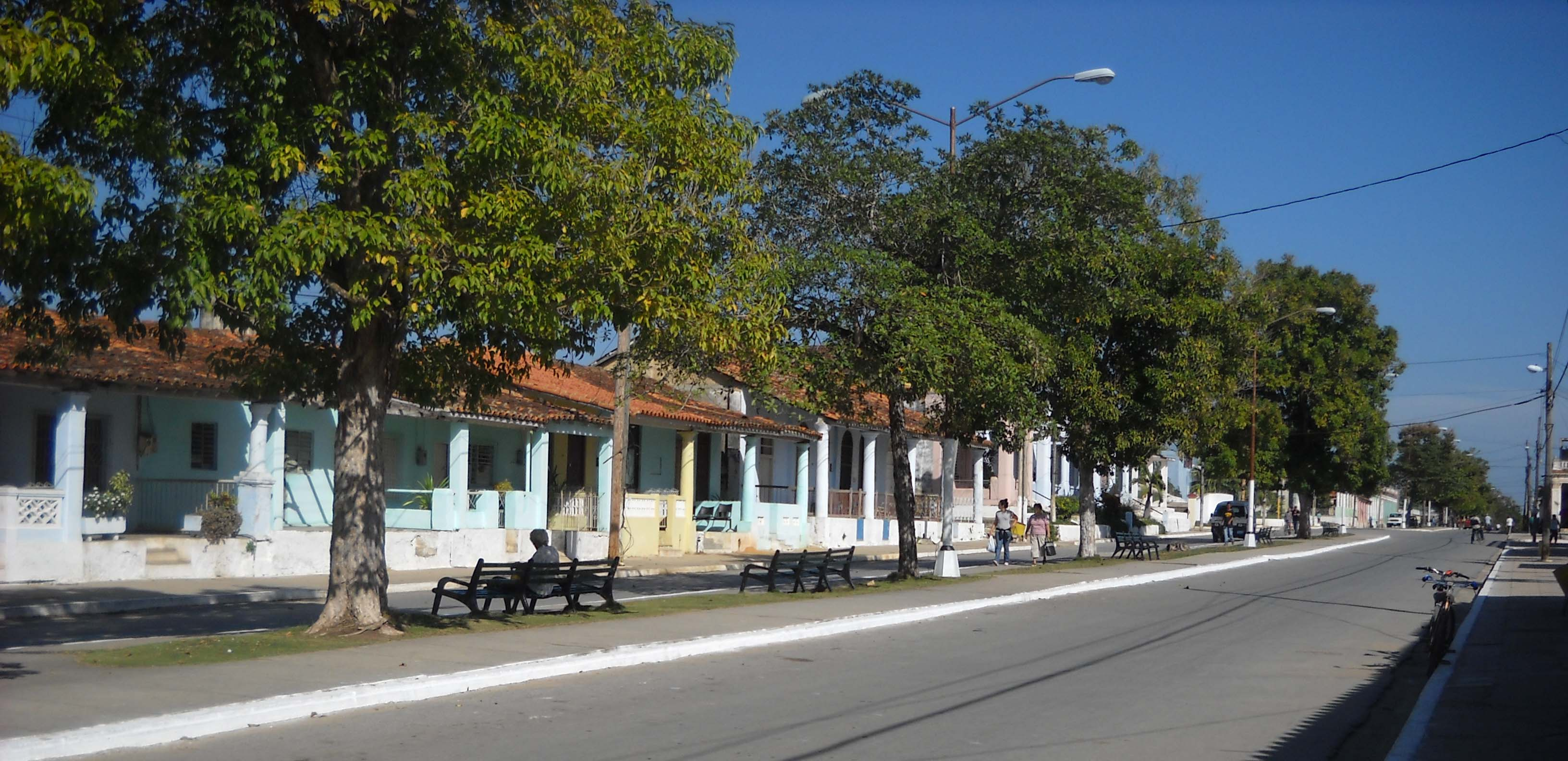
- The Paseo Juana Romero

- Coat of arms

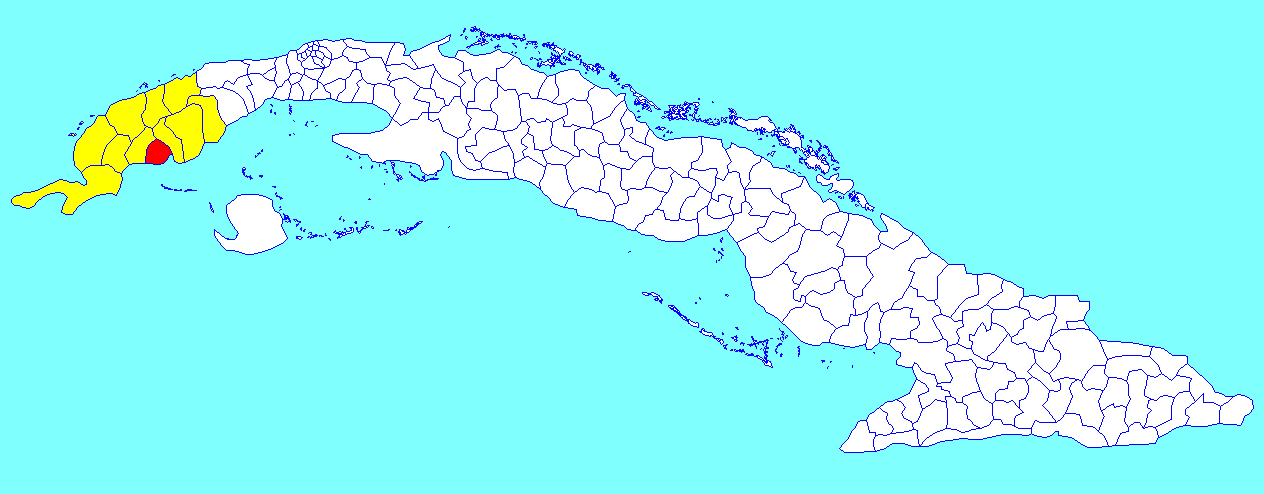
- San Luis municipality (red) within Pinar del Río Province (yellow) and Cuba
- Coordinates: 22°16′58″N 83°46′5″W
- Country: Cuba
- Province: Pinar del Río
- Founded: 1827
- Established: 1879

Area
  - Total: 765 km^{2} (295 sq mi)
- Elevation: 25 m (82 ft)

Population (2022)
  - Total: 31,242
  - Density: 40.8/km^{2} (106/sq mi)
- Time zone: UTC-5 (EST)
- Area code: +53-82

San Luis is a municipality and town in the Pinar del Río Province of Cuba. It is centered mainly on agriculture (tobacco, rice, fruit crops), stock raising.

== History ==
It was founded in 1827, and established as a municipality in 1879, when it split from San Juan y Martínez. Until 1977, its territory included the seaport village of La Coloma, currently part of Pinar del Río.

== Geography ==
The municipality is located west of Pinar del Río and includes the villages of Barbacoa, Barrigonas, Buenavista, El Corojo, El Retiro, Llanadas, Palizada, Santa María and Tirado.

== Demographics ==
In 2022, the municipality of San Luis had a population of 31,242. With a total area of 765 km^{2} (295 sq mi), it has a population density of 41/km^{2} (110/sq mi).

== See also ==
- Municipalities of Cuba
- List of cities in Cuba
- San Luis Municipal Museum
