= Carlos Manuel de Céspedes, Cuba =

Carlos Manuel de Céspedes Céspedes
- Municipality
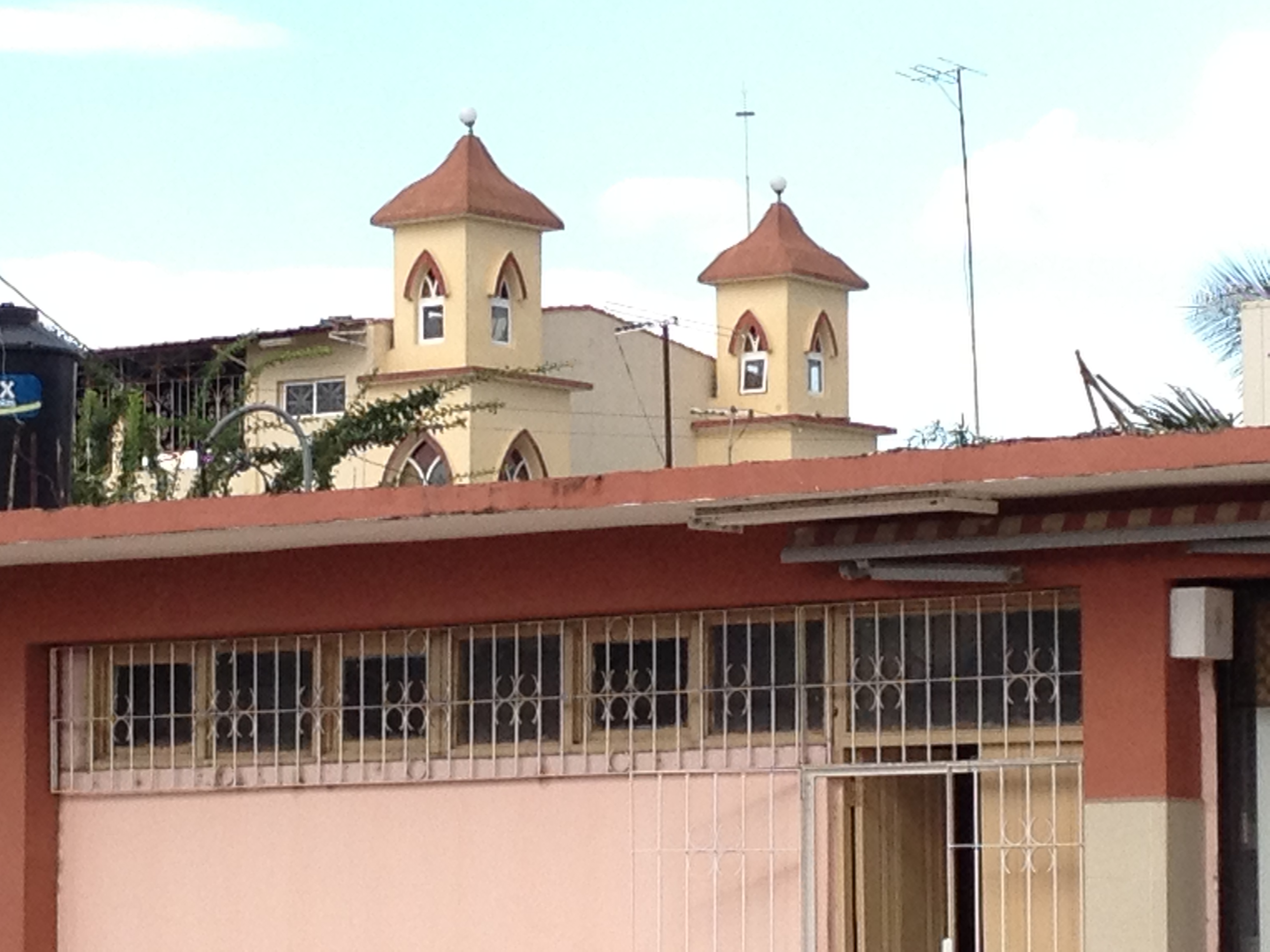

- Coat of arms
- Nickname: Carlo Manuel
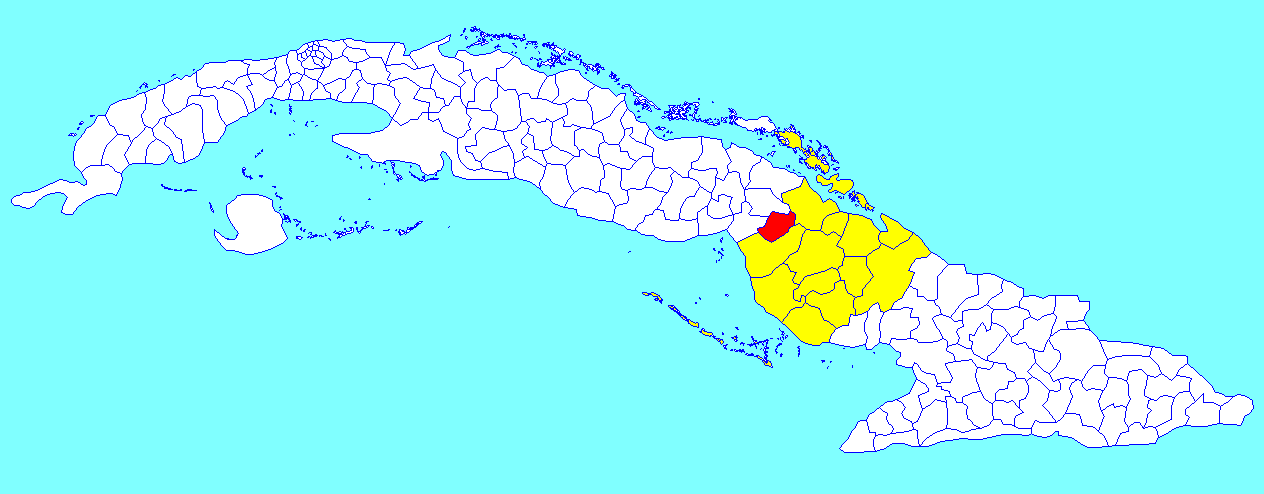
- Céspedes municipality (red) within Camagüey Province (yellow) and Cuba
- Coordinates: 21°34′36″N 78°16′39″W
- Country: Cuba
- Province: Camagüey
- Named for: Carlos Cespedes

Area
  - Total: 653 km^{2} (252 sq mi)
- Elevation: 75 m (246 ft)

Population (2022)
  - Total: 22,842
  - Density: 35.0/km^{2} (90.6/sq mi)
- Time zone: UTC-5 (EST)
- Area code: +53-322
- Climate: Aw
- Website: http://www.cespedes.gob.cu/

Carlos Manuel de Céspedes, also shortened as Céspedes, is a town and municipality in the Camagüey Province of Cuba. It was named for the independence fighter Carlos Manuel de Céspedes (1819-1874).

== Geography ==
It is located in the western part of the province, along the Carretera Central highway. The municipality is bordered by Florida, Esmeralda, Primero de Enero and Baraguá (both in Ciego de Ávila Province). The municipality includes some villages, such as Magarabomba.

== Demographics ==
In 2022, the municipality of Carlos M. de Cespedes had a population of 22,842. With a total area of 653 km^{2} (252 sq mi), it has a population density of 35/km^{2} (91/sq mi).

== Transport ==
Céspedes is crossed by the Carretera Central highway and counts a railway station on the Havana-Santiago de Cuba line. A planned extension of the A1 motorway that will span the entire island will intersect the town.

== See also ==
- Carlos Manuel de Céspedes Municipal Museum
- List of cities in Cuba
- Municipalities of Cuba
