= Sola (Sierra de Cubitas) =

- Town
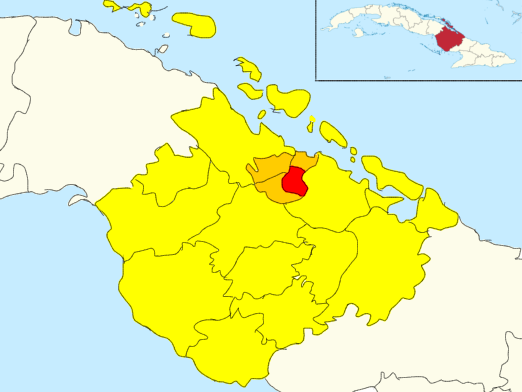
- Sola (Red) in Sierra de Cubitas (Orange) in Camagüey (Yellow)

- Location of Sola in Cuba
- Coordinates: 21°40′27.8″N 77°40′50.0″W
- Country: Cuba
- Province: Camagüey
- Municipality: Sierra de Cubitas
- Founded: 1920
- Elevation: 35 m (115 ft)

Population (2011)
  - Total: 10,000
- Time zone: UTC-5 (EST)
- Area code: +53-322

Sola is a Cuban town and consejo popular ("people's council") of the municipality of Sierra de Cubitas, in Camagüey Province.With a population (2011) of about 10,000, it is the largest settlement of its municipality, including the seat town of Cubitas.

== History ==
Founded on September 28, 1920, it was originally part of Camagüey municipality until the 1977 administrative reform, when it became part of the new municipality of Sierra de Cubitas, whose seat, Cubitas, was founded in the end of 1976.

== Geography ==
Located on a wide rural plain, few km south of the Atlantic Coast and the island of Cayo Guajaba, Sola is divided into a pair of circumscriptions named "Sola 1" and "Sola 2". It is 8 km from La Gloria, 10 from Cubitas, 18 from Senado, 25 from Minas, 30 from Lugareño, 37 from Brasil, 50 from Nuevitas, 51 from Esmeralda and 60 from Camagüey city centre.

== Transport ==
Sola is crossed to the south by the state highway "Circuito Norte" (CN), and in the middle by the provincial road 5-521. It counts a railway station on the Santa Clara-Camajuaní-Morón-Nuevitas line, with local and long-distance trains, connecting the town with Havana too.

== Health ==
The village has a general hospital named "Policlínico 13 de Marzo", located between the centre and the Circuito Norte.

== See also ==
- Sierra de Cubitas Municipal Museum
- Municipalities of Cuba
- List of cities in Cuba
