= Magarabomba =

- Village
- Location of Magarabomba in Cuba
- Coordinates: 21°41′16″N 78°12′25″W
- Country: Cuba
- Province: Camagüey
- Municipality: Céspedes
- Elevation: 81 m (266 ft)
- Time zone: UTC-5 (EST)
- Area code: +53-322

Magarabomba is a village and consejo popular in the Camagüey Province of Cuba. It is part of the municipality of Céspedes.

== Geography ==
Part of the municipality of Florida until 1977 reform, along with the nearby village of Piedrecitas, Magarabomba is located in the western part of the province, between Esmeralda and Céspedes, at an elevation of 81 m (266 ft).

== Demographics ==
Population by year:

- 1857: 23 formed by five groups of houses.
- 1910: 225
- 1919: 3,642
- 1931: 14,025
- 1943: 14,996
