= Sierra de Cubitas =

- Municipality
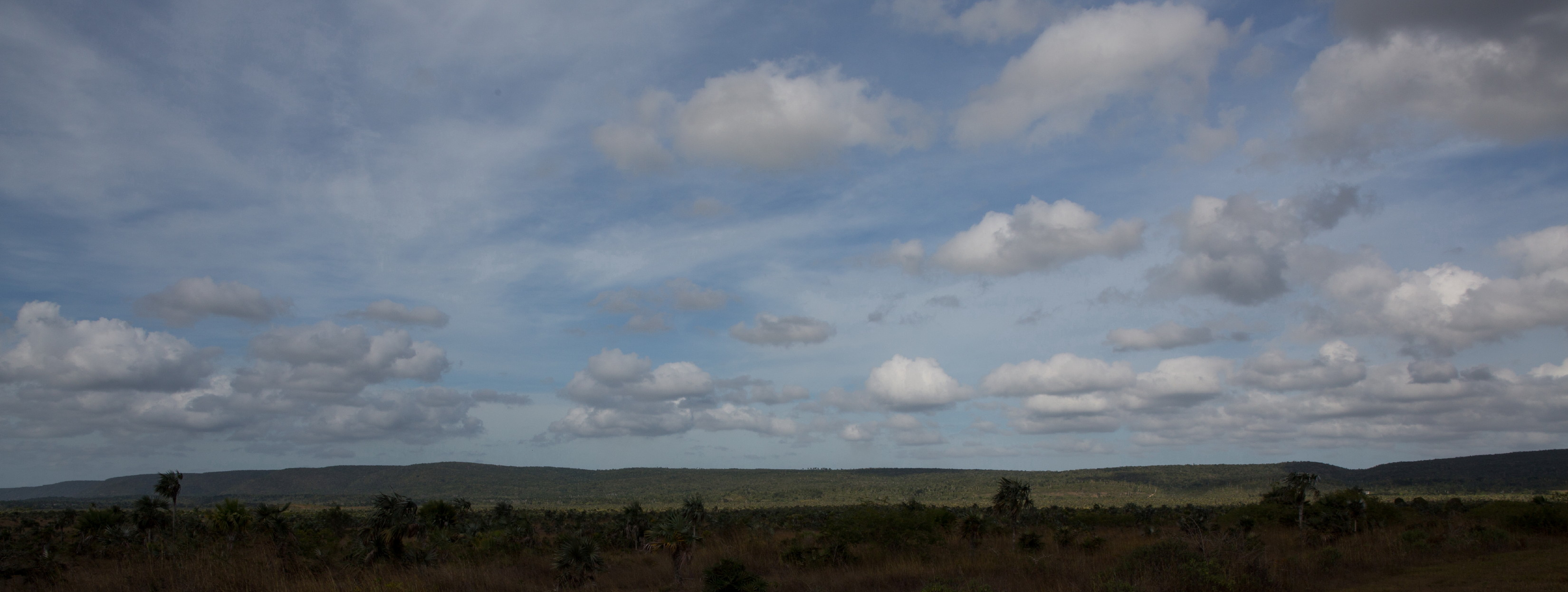

- Coat of arms Coat of arms Version 2

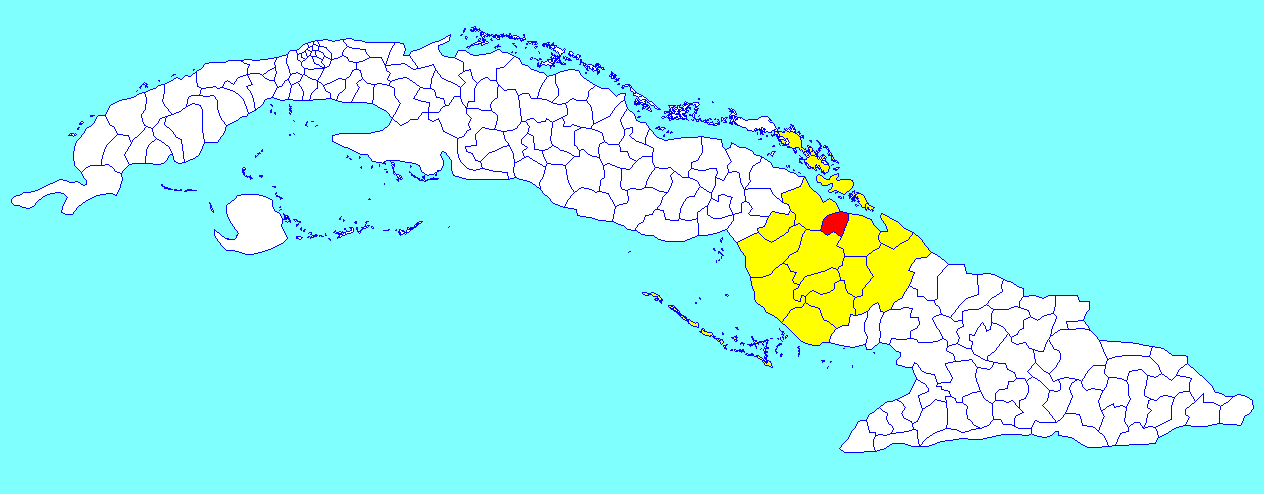
- Sierra de Cubitas municipality (red) within Camagüey Province (yellow) and Cuba
- Coordinates: 21°43′59″N 77°46′14″W
- Country: Cuba
- Province: Camagüey
- Seat: Cubitas

Area
  - Total: 549 km^{2} (212 sq mi)
- Elevation: 35 m (115 ft)

Population (2022)
  - Total: 17,942
  - Density: 32.7/km^{2} (84.6/sq mi)
- Time zone: UTC-5 (EST)
- Area code: +53-322

Sierra de Cubitas is a municipality in the Camagüey Province of Cuba. The municipal seat is located in the town of Cubitas.

== Geography ==
The municipality borders with Esmeralda, Camagüey and Minas. Its territory includes the towns of Cubitas (seat) and Sola (largest settlement), and the villages of Cubita Madura, El Colorado, Imías, La Gloria, Paso de Lesca, Playa Piloto, Saimí and Vilató. Cayo Guajaba, one of the cays of Jardines del Rey archipelago, is located north of Cubitas, across the Bay of la Gloria (Bahia de la Gloria).

== Demographics ==
In 2022, the municipality of Sierra de Cubitas had a population of 17,942. With a total area of 549 km^{2} (212 sq mi), it has a population density of 33/km^{2} (85/sq mi).

== See also ==
- Sierra de Cubitas Municipal Museum
- List of cities in Cuba
- Municipalities of Cuba
