= Venezuela Municipal Museum =

Museum in Venezuela, Cuba

- Museo Municipal de Venezuela
- Established: 8 April 1983
- Location: Venezuela, Cuba

Venezuela Municipal Museum is a museum located in Venezuela, Cuba. It was established on 8 April 1983.

The museum holds collections on history, numismatics, archeology, and decorative arts.

== See also ==
- List of museums in Cuba
