= Guisa Municipal Museum =

Museum in Cuba

- Museo Municipal de Guisa
- Established: 27 November 1985
- Location: Guisa, Cuba

Guisa Municipal Museum is a museum located in Guisa, Cuba. It was established as a museum on 27 November 1985.

The museum holds sections on history and weaponry.

== See also ==
- List of museums in Cuba
