= El Mayorquín =

- Location in Cuba
- Coordinates: 22°47′37″N 82°32′41″W
- Country: Cuba
- Province: Artemisa
- Municipality: Alquizar
- Consejo popular: Mayorquín - Sur

Population (2012)
  - Total: 1,722

El Mayorquín is a town in Alquízar, Cuba.
