= Jimaguayú Municipal Museum =

Museum in Cuba

- Museo Municipal de Jimaguayú
- Established: 27 December 1982
- Location: Jimaguayú, Cuba

Jimaguayú Municipal Museum is a museum located in Jimaguayú, Cuba. It was established on 27 December 1982.

The museum holds collections on history, weaponry and numismatics.

== See also ==
- List of museums in Cuba
