= Pablo (Primero de Enero) =

- Village
- Location of Pablo in Cuba
- Coordinates: 21°48′42″N 78°25′21″W
- Country: Cuba
- Province: Ciego de Ávila
- Municipality: Primero de Enero
- Founded: 1962

Population (2011)
  - Total: 671
- Time zone: UTC-5 (EST)
- Area code: +53-43

Pablo is a Cuban village and consejo popular ("popular council") belonging to the municipality of Primero de Enero, in Ciego de Avila Province. It was founded in 1962 and has a population of 671.

== Economy ==
The economy is centered in the agriculture of sugarcane, livestock and growing various crops.

== Education ==
Pablo has a primary school for children attending first to sixth grade.

== Health ==
A Medico de Familia clinic and a pharmacy provide health services to residents.

== See also ==
- El Canario
