= Sierra de Cubitas Municipal Museum =

Museum in Cuba

- Museo Municipal de Sierra de Cubitas
- Established: 20 December 1982
- Location: Sierra de Cubitas, Cuba

Sierra de Cubitas Municipal Museum is a museum located in Sierra de Cubitas, Cuba. It was established on 20 December 1982.

The museum holds collections on history and weaponry.

== See also ==
- List of museums in Cuba
- Sola (Sierra de Cubitas)
