= Primero de Enero Municipal Museum =

Museum in Cuba

- Museo Municipal de Primero de Enero
- Established: 28 September 1982
- Location: Primero de Enero, Cuba

Primero de Enero Municipal Museum is a museum located in Primero de Enero, Cuba. It was established on 28 September 1982.

The museum holds collections on history, natural science, numismatics and archeology.

== See also ==
- List of museums in Cuba
