= Baraguá Municipal Museum =

Museum in Cuba

- Museo Municipal de Baraguá
- Established: 26 September 1983
- Location: Baraguá, Cuba

Baraguá Municipal Museum is a museum located in Baraguá, Cuba. It was established on 26 September 1983.

The museum holds collections on history, decorative arts, weaponry, archeology, natural science and numismatics.

== See also ==
- List of museums in Cuba
