= Los Palacios =

- Municipality
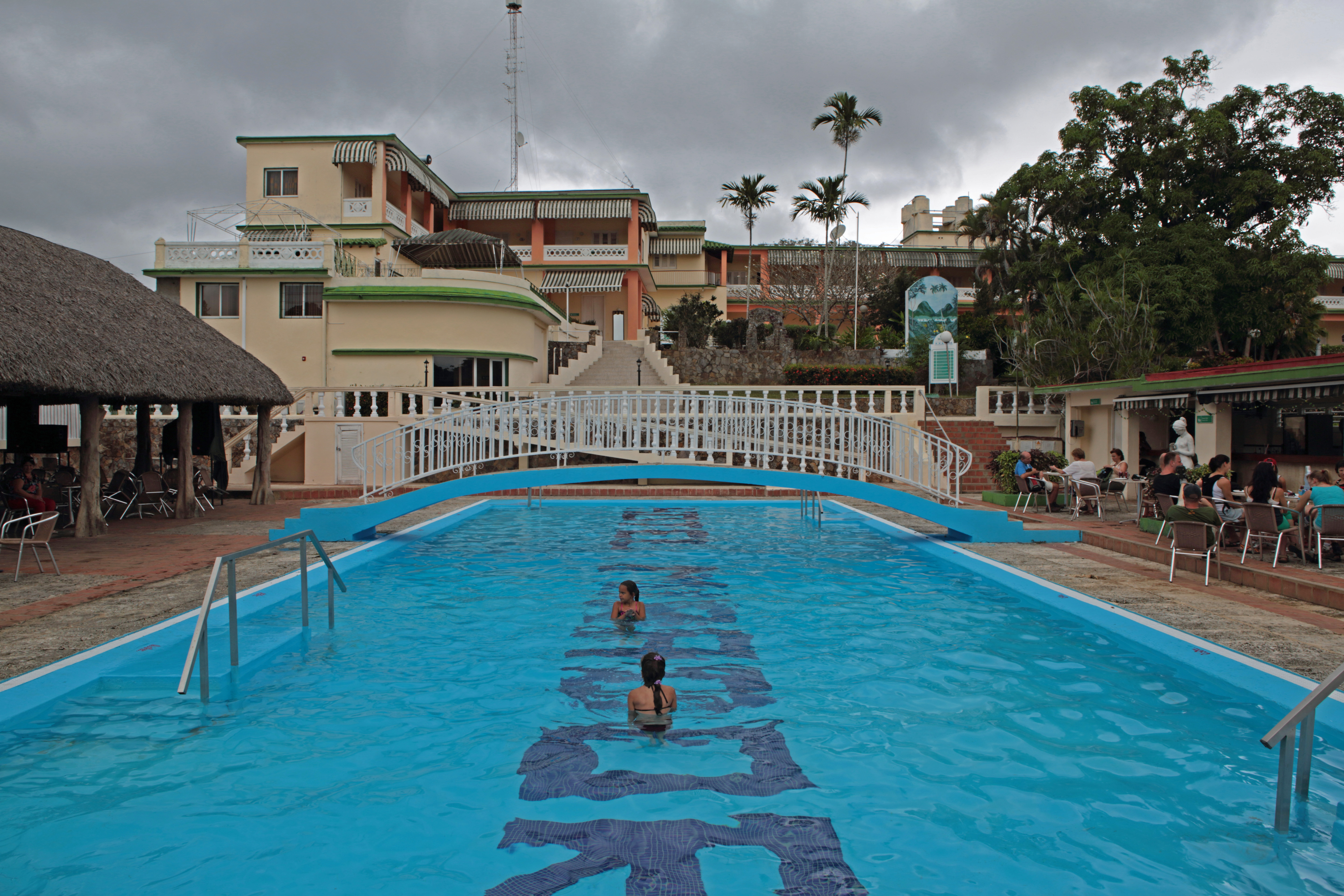
- San Diego de los Baňos, Los Palacios

- Coat of arms

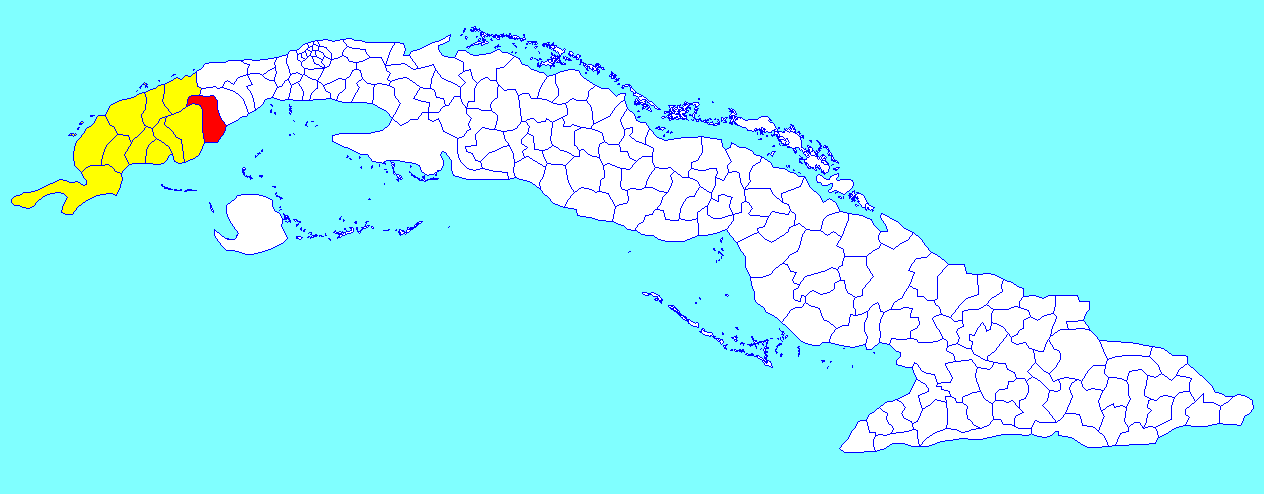
- Los Palacios municipality (red) within Pinar del Río Province (yellow) and Cuba
- Coordinates: 22°34′56″N 83°14′56″W
- Country: Cuba
- Province: Pinar del Río
- Founded: 1760
- Established: 1879

Area
  - Total: 786 km^{2} (303 sq mi)
- Elevation: 45 m (148 ft)

Population (2022)
  - Total: 37,524
  - Density: 47.7/km^{2} (124/sq mi)
- Time zone: UTC-5 (EST)
- Area code: +53-82

Los Palacios (Spanish pronunciation: [los paˈlasjos]) is a municipality and town in the Pinar del Río Province of Cuba. It was founded in 1760.

== Geography ==
The municipality is divided into the barrios of Limones, Macurijes, Paso Real, Santa Mónica, Santo Domingo, Sierra and Urbano.

Los Palacios Municipal Museum is located in the 21st street.

=== Neighborhoods ===
The neighborhoods of Los Palacios in 1943 were: Limones, Macurijes, Paso Real, Santa Monica, Santo Domingo, Sierra and Urbano.

- Limones: This neighborhood had a population of 1,797 in 1943. It is located twelve kilometers from the municipal seat.
- Macurijes: The population of this neighborhood in 1943 was 1,652 people. It is located sixteen kilometers from the municipal seat.
- Paso Real: This neighborhood had a population of 3,447 in 1943. It is located six kilometers from the municipal seat. Its seat is the town of Paso Real. It was formerly a district. In 1900, the district was abolished, and its territory was divided between the municipalities of Consolación del Sur and Los Palacios.
- Santa Monica: This neighborhood had 2,275 inhabitants in 1943. It is located sixteen kilometers from the municipal seat.

== Demographics ==
In 2022, the municipality of Los Palacios had a population of 37,524. With a total area of 786 km^{2} (303 sq mi), it has a population density of 48/km^{2} (120/sq mi).

== See also ==
- Los Palacios Municipal Museum
- Municipalities of Cuba
- List of cities in Cuba
