= Quivicán =

- Municipality
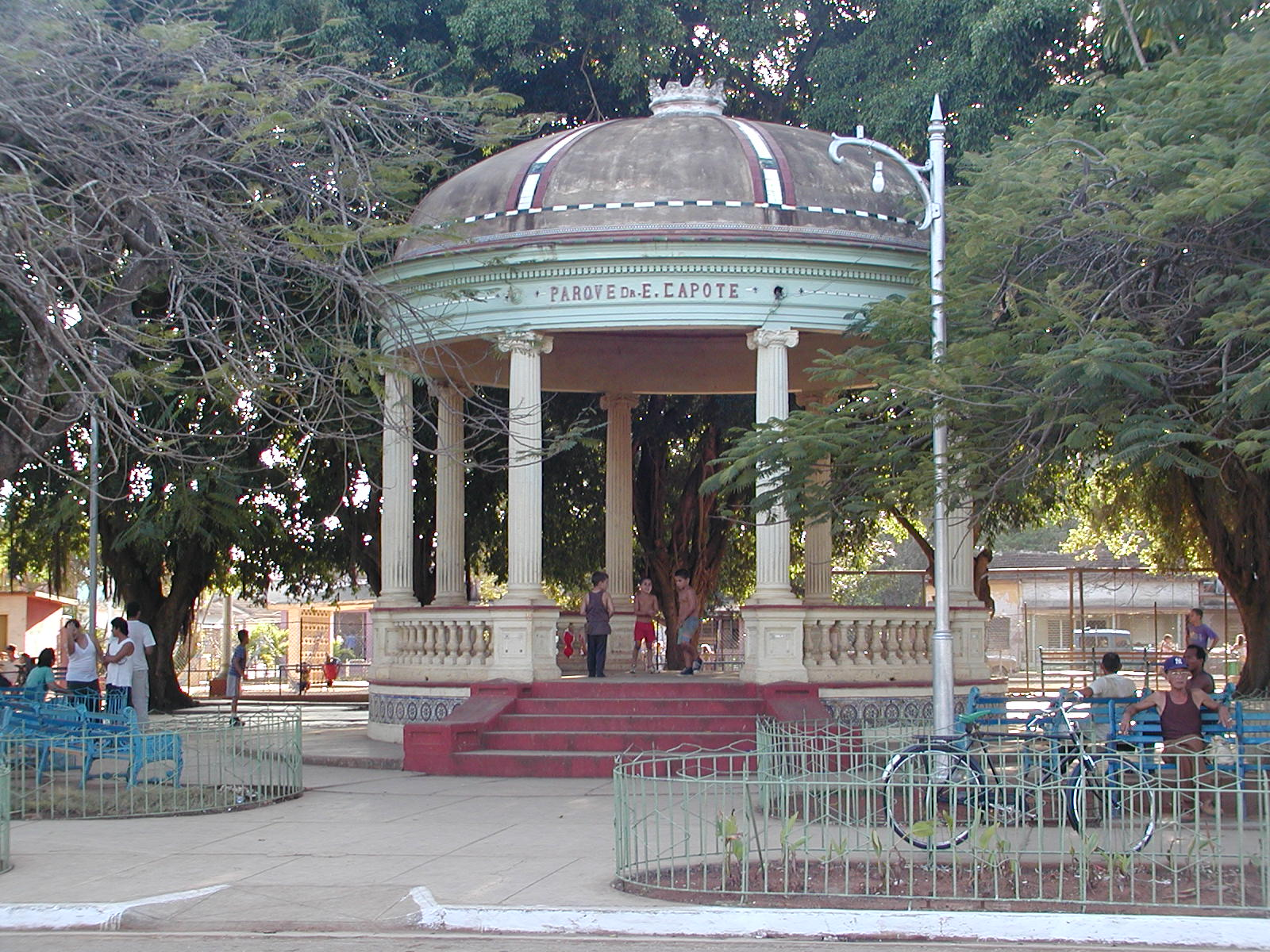
- The "Glorieta" bandstand

- Flag

- Quivicán municipality (red) within Cuba
- Coordinates: 22°49′29″N 82°21′21″W
- Country: Cuba
- Province: Mayabeque
- Founded: 1700
- Established: 1919 (Municipality)

Area
  - Total: 283 km^{2} (109 sq mi)
- Elevation: 50 m (160 ft)

Population (2022)
  - Total: 30,016
  - Density: 106/km^{2} (275/sq mi)
- Time zone: UTC-5 (EST)
- Area code: +53-7
- Website: https://www.quivican.gob.cu/es/

Quivicán is a town and municipality in Mayabeque Province of Cuba. It is located in the south west of the province, bordering the Gulf of Batabanó. The name is of Taino origin (spelled Quibicán). It was founded in 1700.

== Geography ==
The municipality is divided into the barrios of Quivican Pueblo, La Salud, San Felipe, Pablo Noriega, San Agustín, Guiro Boñingal, Güiro Marrero, Santa Mónica, Aguacate and Fajardo.

== Demographics ==
In 2022, the municipality of Quivicán had a population of 30,016. With a total area of 283 km^{2} (109 sq mi), it has a population density of 110/km^{2} (280/sq mi).

== Notable people ==
- Bebo Valdés (b. 1918), pianist
- Chucho Valdés (b. 1941), pianist
- Alejandro Miguel Portal Oliva (b. 1995), soccer player

== See also ==
- Municipalities of Cuba
- List of cities in Cuba
- Quivicán Municipal Museum
