= Guayacanes =

- Village
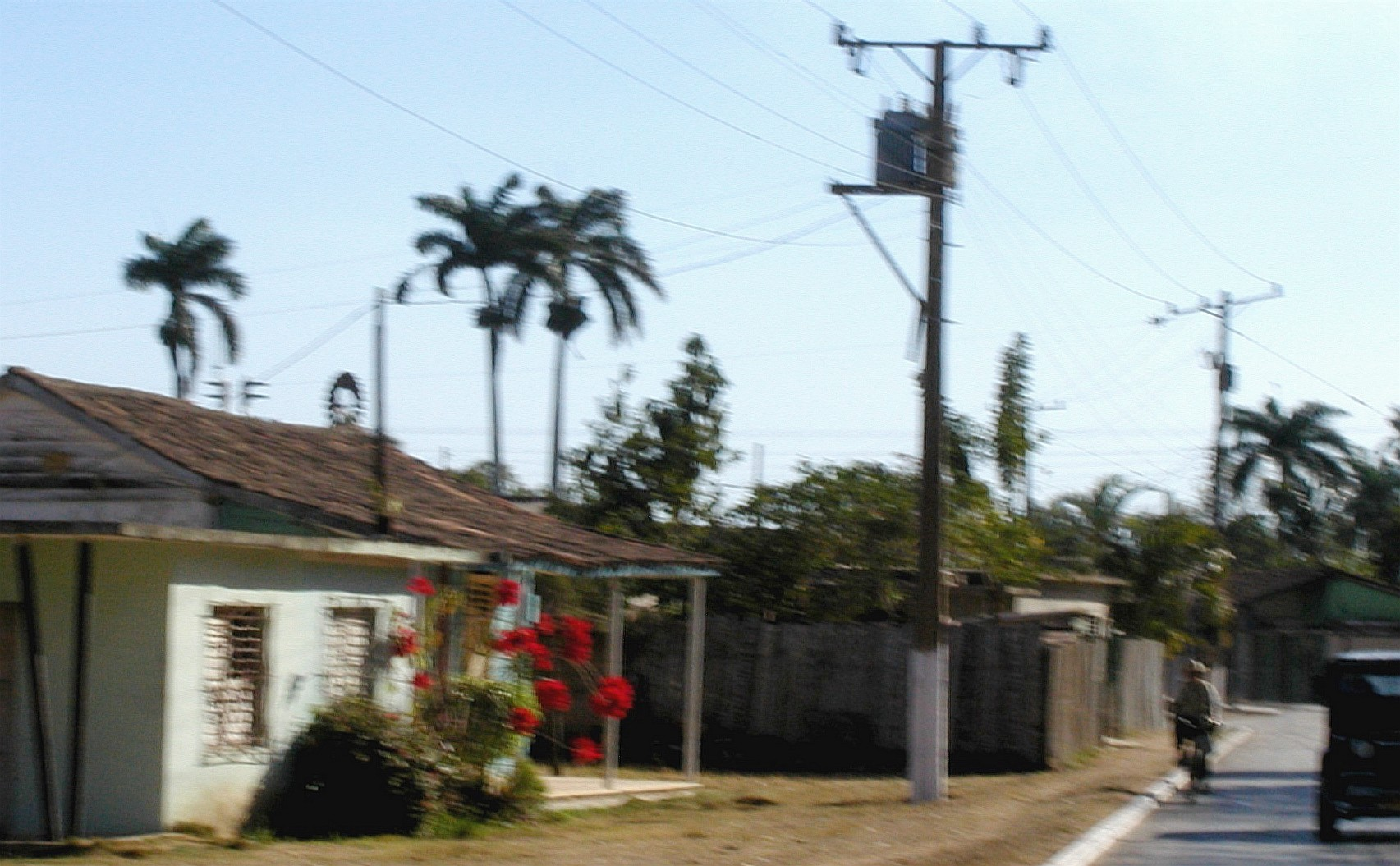
- Entrance to Guayacanes

- Location of Guayacanes in Cuba
- Coordinates: 21°52′46.92″N 78°55′58.8″W
- Country: Cuba
- Province: Ciego de Ávila
- Municipality: Majagua
- Elevation: 27 m (89 ft)
- Time zone: UTC-5 (EST)
- Area code: +53-23

Guayacanes is a village in the municipality of Majagua, Ciego de Ávila Province, Cuba.

== Overview ==
The village, originally part of the municipality of Ciego de Ávila, is located between the city and Majagua. It counts a railway station on the Havana-Santa Clara-Camagüey-Santiago line and is located just in south of the Carretera Central.
