= Ciro Redondo Municipal Museum =

Museum in Cuba

Coordinates: 21.84298°N 78.77845°W

- Museo Municipal de Ciro Redondo
- Established: 11 February 1983
- Location: Ciro Redondo, Cuba

Ciro Redondo Municipal Museum is a museum located in Ciro Redondo, Cuba. It was established on 11 February 1983.

The museum holds collections on history, decorative arts, weaponry, archeology and numismatics.

== See also ==
- List of museums in Cuba
