= Bolivia Municipal Museum =

Museum in Cuba

- Museo Municipal de Bolivia
- Established: 27 December 1982
- Location: Bolivia, Cuba

Bolivia Municipal Museum is a museum located in Bolivia, Cuba. It was established on 27 December 1982.

The museum holds collections on history, archeology, natural science and decorative arts.

== See also ==
- List of museums in Cuba
