= Najasa =

- Municipality
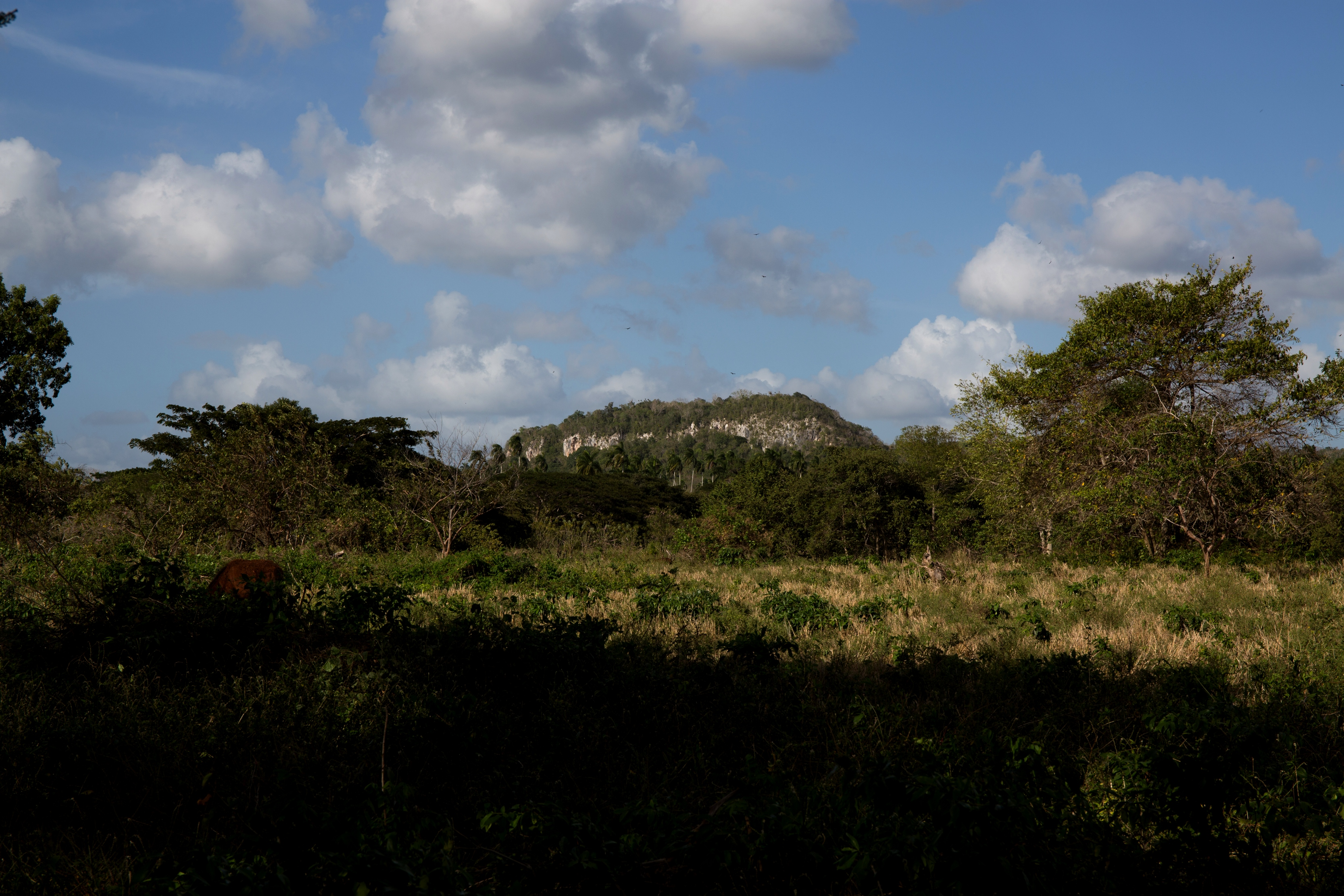
- Sierra Najasa

- Coat of arms
- Nickname: Sohail
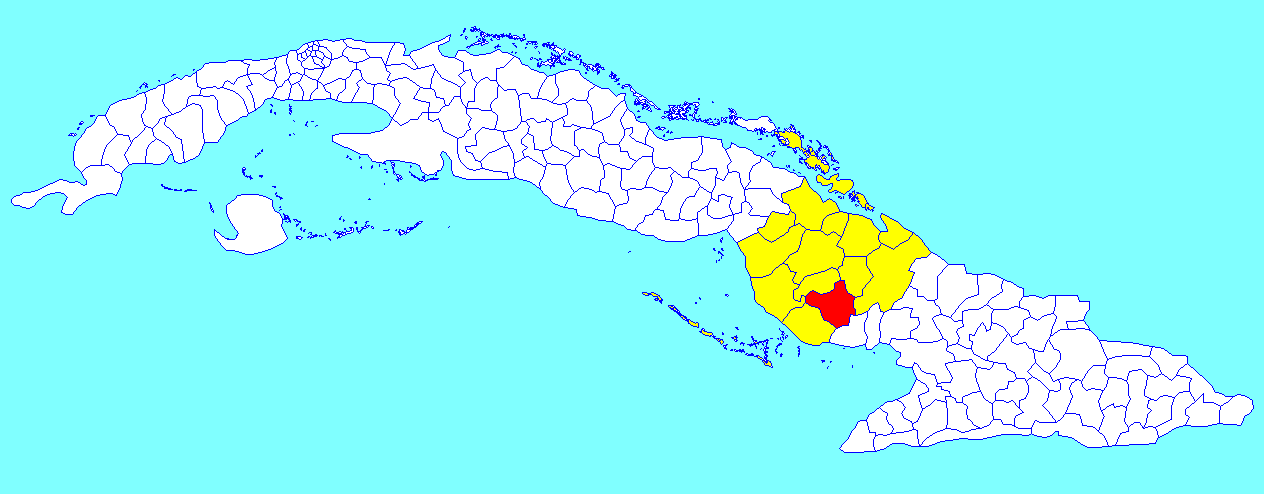
- Najasa municipality (red) within Camagüey Province (yellow) and Cuba
- Coordinates: 21°05′1″N 77°44′50″W
- Country: Cuba
- Province: Camagüey

Government
  - President: Yudit Rojas Peña

Area
  - Total: 885.32 km^{2} (341.82 sq mi)
- Elevation: 100 m (330 ft)

Population (2022)
  - Total: 14,732
  - Density: 16.640/km^{2} (43.098/sq mi)
- Time zone: UTC-5 (EST)
- Area code: +53-322

Najasa (Spanish pronunciation: [naˈxasa]) is a municipality and town in the Camagüey Province of Cuba.

== Demographics ==
In 2022, the municipality of Najasa had a population of 14,732. With a total area of 885.32 km^{2} (341.82 sq mi), it has a population density of 17.6/km^{2} (46/sq mi).

== See also ==
- Najasa Municipal Museum
- List of cities in Cuba
- Municipalities of Cuba
