= El Canario (Primero de Enero) =

- Village
- Location of El Canario in Cuba
- Coordinates: 21°50′31″N 78°26′08″W
- Country: Cuba
- Province: Ciego de Ávila
- Municipality: Primero de Enero

Population (2011)
  - Total: 41
- Time zone: UTC-5 (EST)
- Area code: +53-43

El Canario is a Cuban village and hamlet belonging to the municipality of Primero de Enero, in Ciego de Avila Province. It has a population of 41.

== Economy ==
The economy is centered in the agriculture of sugarcane, livestock, coal, and growing various crops.

== Education ==
El Canario has a primary school for children attending first to sixth grade.

== Health ==
Residents have access to a Medico de Familia clinic and a pharmacy that provide health services in the nearby village of Pablo.

== See also ==
- Pablo (village)
