= Quivicán Municipal Museum =

Museum in Cuba

- Museo Municipal de Quivicán
- Established: 30 January 1982
- Location: Quivicán, Cuba

Quivicán Municipal Museum is a museum located in the 19th avenue in Quivicán, Cuba. It was established on 30 January 1982.

The museum holds collections on history, weaponry, archeology and decorative arts.

== See also ==
- List of museums in Cuba
