= Carlos Manuel de Céspedes Municipal Museum =

Museum in Cuba

- Museo Municipal de Carlos Manuel de Céspedes
- Established: 30 December 1982
- Location: Carlos Manuel de Céspedes, Cuba
- Coordinates: 21.57762°N 78.27852°W

Carlos Manuel de Céspedes Municipal Museum is a museum located in the 17th street in Carlos Manuel de Céspedes, Cuba. It was established on 30 December 1982.

The museum holds collections on history and weaponry.

== See also ==
- List of museums in Cuba
