= San Juan y Martínez Municipal Museum =

Museum in Cuba

- Museo Municipal de San Juan y Martínez
- Location: San Juan y Martínez, Cuba

San Juan y Martínez Municipal Museum is a museum located in the Francisco Riveras street in San Juan y Martínez, Cuba.

It holds sections on history, numismatics, ethnology and weaponry.

== See also ==
- List of museums in Cuba
