= Sibanicú Municipal Museum =

Museum in Cuba

- Museo Municipal de Sibanicú
- Established: 30 December 1982
- Location: Sibanicú, Cuba

Sibanicú Municipal Museum is a museum located in Sibanicú, Cuba. It was established on 30 December 1982.

The museum holds collections on history, weaponry and archeology.

== See also ==
- List of museums in Cuba
