= Los Palacios Municipal Museum =

Museum in Cuba

- Museo Municipal de Los Palacios
- Established: 30 December 1980
- Location: Los Palacios, Cuba

Los Palacios Municipal Museum is a museum located in the 21st street Los Palacios, Cuba. In this building lived Enrique Troncoso, a Cuban revolutionary. It was established as a museum on 30 December 1980.

The museum holds several collections on history, numismatics, local publications and weapons.

== See also ==
- List of museums in Cuba
