= Vertientes =

- Municipality
- Coat of arms

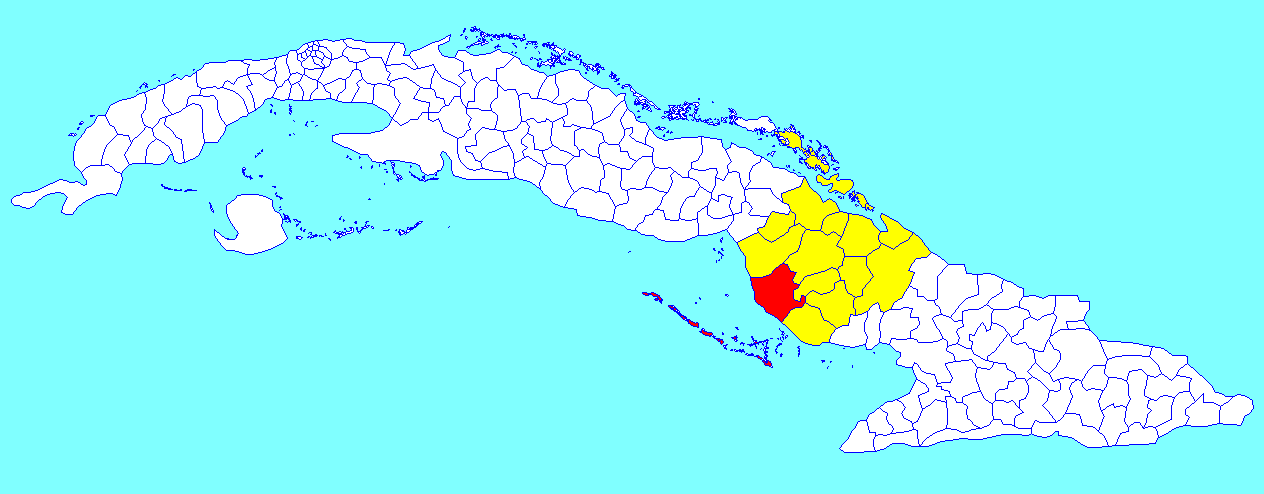
- Vertientes municipality (red) within Camagüey Province (yellow) and Cuba
- Coordinates: 21°15′25″N 78°08′57″W
- Country: Cuba
- Province: Camagüey

Government
  - President: Rolando Santana Corrales

Area
  - Total: 2,005 km^{2} (774 sq mi)
- Elevation: 70 m (230 ft)

Population (2022)
  - Total: 48,821
  - Density: 24.35/km^{2} (63.07/sq mi)
- Time zone: UTC-5 (EST)
- Area code: +53-322
- Website: http://www.vertientes.gob.cu/es/

Vertientes is a municipality and town in the Camagüey Province of Cuba.

== Demographics ==
In 2022, the municipality of Vertientes had a population of 48,821. With a total area of 2,005 km^{2} (774 sq mi), it has a population density of 24/km^{2} (62/sq mi).

== See also ==
- Municipalities of Cuba
- List of cities in Cuba
- Vertientes Municipal Museum
