= Majagua Municipal Museum =

Museum in Cuba

- Museo Municipal de Majagua
- Established: 5 January 1982
- Location: Majagua, Cuba

Majagua Municipal Museum is a museum located in Majagua, Cuba. It was established on 5 January 1982.

The museum holds collections on history, weapons, decorative arts and ethnography.

== See also ==
- List of museums in Cuba
