= Esmeralda Municipal Museum =

Museum in Cuba

- Museo Municipal de Esmeralda
- Established: 30 December 1982
- Location: Esmeralda, Cuba

Esmeralda Municipal Museum is a museum located in Martí street in Esmeralda, Cuba. It was established on 30 December 1982.

The museum holds collections on history and weaponry.

== See also ==
- List of museums in Cuba
