= Guane =

- Municipality
- Coat of arms

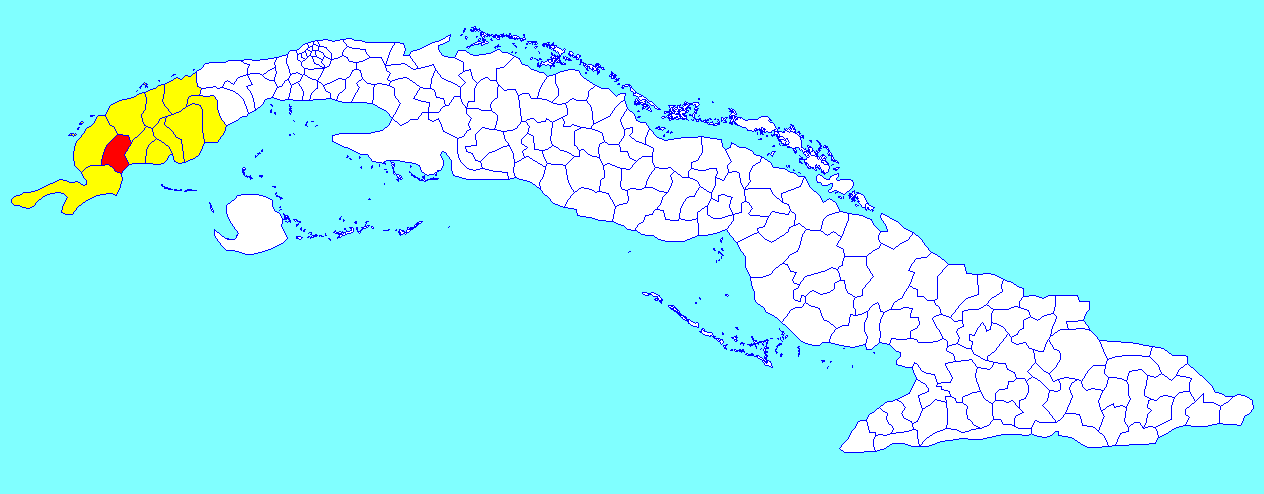
- Guane municipality (red) within Pinar del Río Province (yellow) and Cuba
- Coordinates: 22°12′2″N 84°05′2″W
- Country: Cuba
- Province: Pinar del Río
- Founded: 1602
- Established: 1879

Area
  - Total: 717 km^{2} (277 sq mi)
- Elevation: 25 m (82 ft)

Population (2022)
  - Total: 34,922
  - Density: 48.7/km^{2} (126/sq mi)
- Time zone: UTC-5 (EST)
- Area code: +53-82

Guane is a municipality and town in the Pinar del Río Province of Cuba. It was founded in 1602.

== Geography ==
The wards of the municipality include Punta de La Sierra, Portales, Guane 1, Guane 2, Combate la Teneria, Isabel Rubio, Sabalo, and Mollna.

== History ==
Guane is a Cuban Indigenous name. Before it was renamed Pinar del Río in 1774, the area was known as the old colonial capital of Guane.

The municipality was formerly divided into the barrios of Cabo de San Antonio y La Fe, Catalina, Cortés, Hato de Guane, Isabel Rubio (Paso Real de Guane), Juan Gómez, La Grifa, Las Martinas, Los Acostas, Manuel Lazo (Cayuco), Portales, Pueblo, Punta de la Sierra, Sábalo and Tenería.

It was the main city of Filipino migrants to Cuba, who were known as Chinos Manila among the local population. The Filipinos worked the huge tobacco plantations much as they did in their home country, in the present provinces of Ilocos Sur, Tarlac, Ilocos Norte, Cagayan and Isabela. During that time, the Spanish colonizers had a virtual monopoly of the tobacco trade through their company, the Tabacalera.

== Demographics ==
In 2022, the municipality of Guane had a population of 34,922. With a total area of 717 km^{2} (277 sq mi), it has a population density of 49/km^{2} (130/sq mi).

== See also ==
- Guane Municipal Museum
- tuKola (produced in the town)
- Municipalities of Cuba
- List of cities in Cuba
