= Vertientes Municipal Museum =

Museum in Cuba

- Museo Municipal de Vertientes
- Established: 16 December 1982
- Location: Vertientes, Cuba

Vertientes Municipal Museum is a museum located in Vertientes, Cuba. It was established on 16 December 1982.

The museum holds collections on history and weaponry.

== See also ==
- List of museums in Cuba
