= San Luis Municipal Museum =

Museum in Cuba

- Museo Municipal de San Luis
- Established: 31 May 1982
- Location: San Luis, Pinar del Río, Cuba

San Luis Municipal Museum is a museum located in Juana Romero avenue in San Luis, Pinar del Río, Cuba. It was established as a museum on 31 May 1982.

== See also ==
- List of museums in Cuba
