= Najasa Municipal Museum =

Museum in Cuba

- Museo Municipal de Najasa
- Established: 30 December 1982
- Location: Najasa, Cuba
- Coordinates: 21.07622°N 77.74801°W

Najasa Municipal Museum is a museum located in Najasa, Cuba. It was established on 30 December 1982.

The museum holds collections on history, weaponry, decorative arts and archeology.

== See also ==
- List of museums in Cuba
