= Alquízar Municipal Museum =

Museum in Alquízar, Cuba

- Museo Municipal de Alquízar
- Established: 28 January 1981
- Location: Alquízar, Cuba

Alquízar Municipal Museum is a museum located in the 91st avenue in Alquízar, Cuba. It was established as museum on 28 January 1981.

The museum holds sections on history, weaponry and decorative arts.

== See also ==
- List of museums in Cuba
