= Sibanicú =

- Municipality
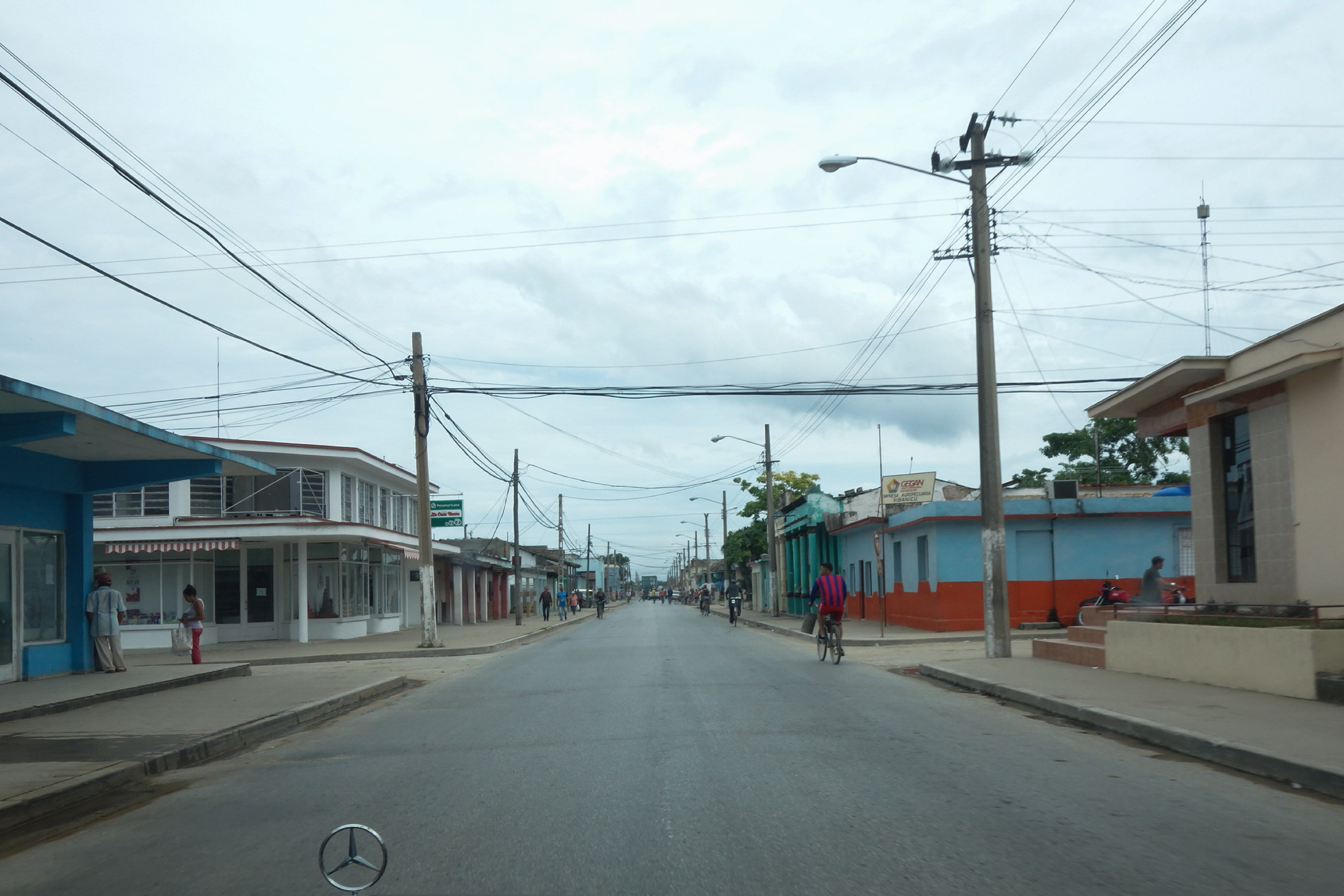
- The Carretera Central in central Sibanicú

- Coat of arms

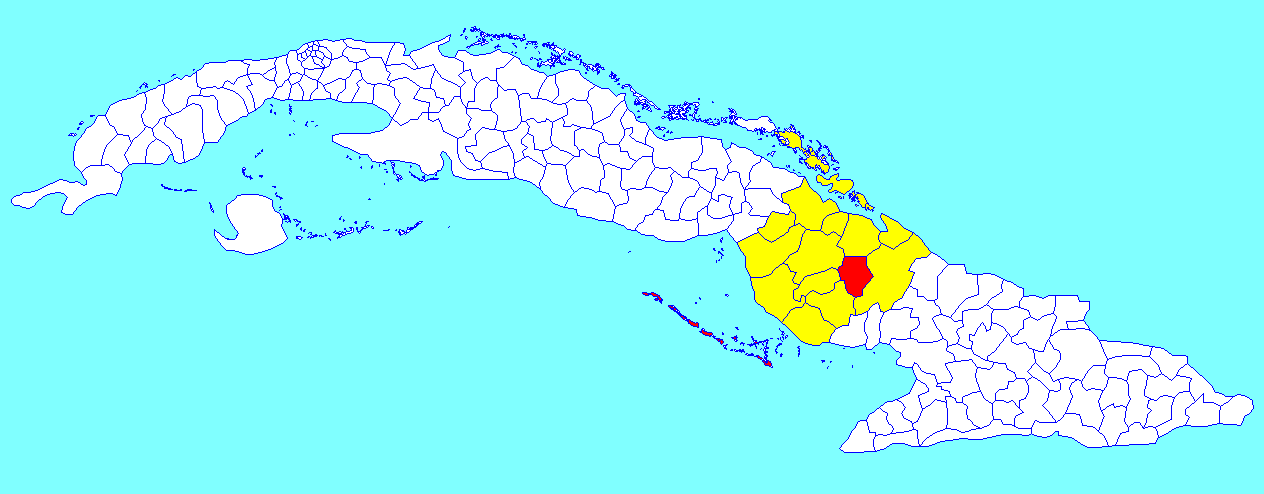
- Sibanicú municipality (red) within Camagüey Province (yellow) and Cuba
- Coordinates: 21°14′20″N 77°31′16″W
- Country: Cuba
- Province: Camagüey

Area
  - Total: 736 km^{2} (284 sq mi)
- Elevation: 90 m (300 ft)

Population (2022)
  - Total: 28,930
  - Density: 39.3/km^{2} (102/sq mi)
- Time zone: UTC-5 (EST)
- Area code: +53-322
- Website: http://www.sibanicu.gob.cu/

Sibanicú is a municipality and town in the Camagüey Province of Cuba.

== Demographics ==
In 2022, the municipality of Sibanicú had a population of 28,930. With a total area of 736 km^{2} (284 sq mi), it has a population density of 39/km^{2} (100/sq mi).

== See also ==
- Sibanicú Municipal Museum
- List of cities in Cuba
- Municipalities of Cuba
