= Jimaguayú =

- First Subdivision of Camagüey Province
- Subdivicion de Jimaguayú
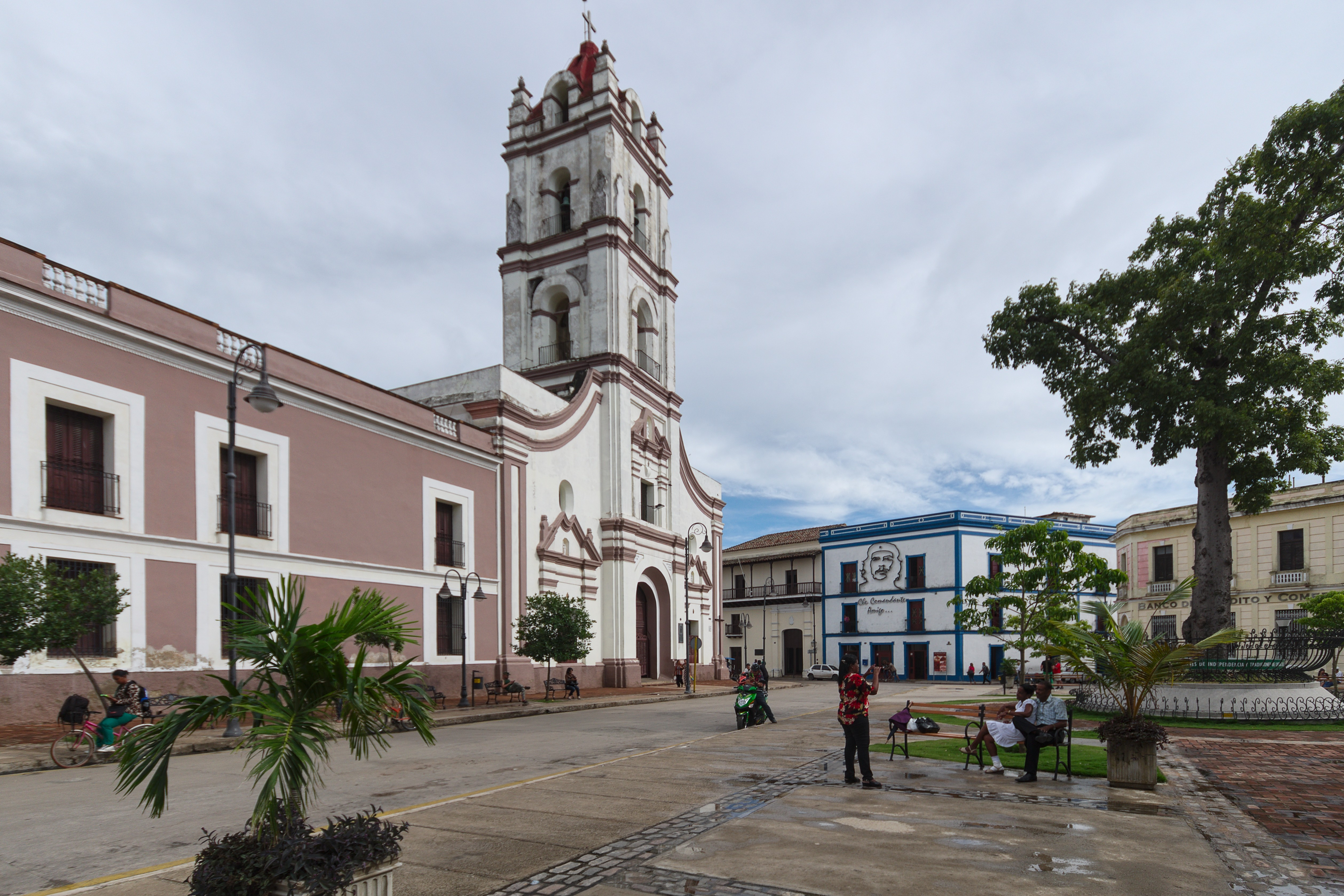

- Coat of arms

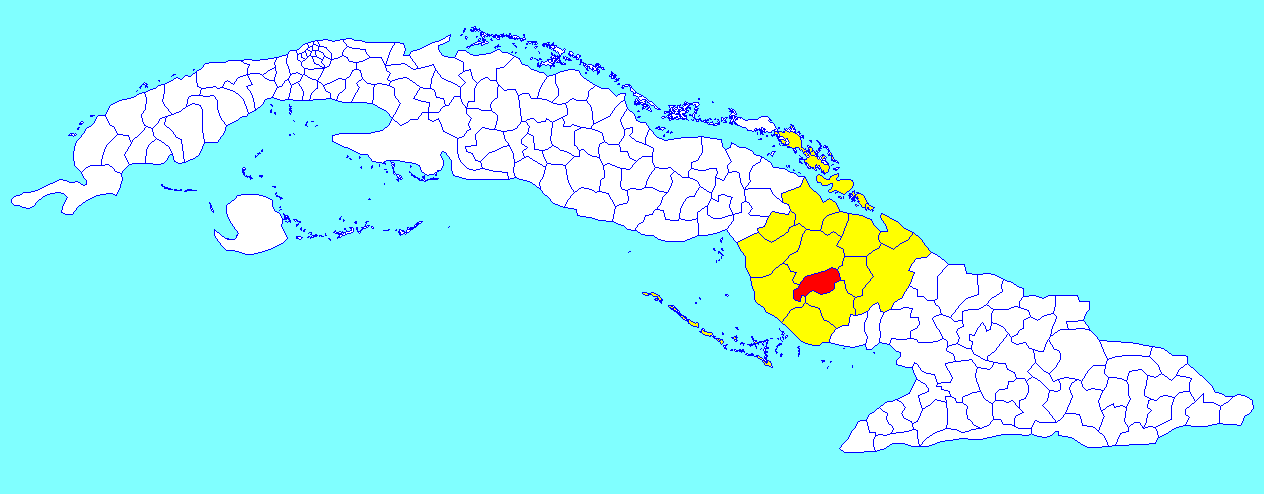
- Jimaguayú municipality (red) within Camagüey Province (yellow) and Cuba
- Coordinates: 21°16′0″N 77°49′49″W
- Country: Cuba
- Province: Camagüey

Area
  - Total: 799 km^{2} (308 sq mi)
- Elevation: 110 m (360 ft)

Population (2022)
  - Total: 19,687
  - Density: 24.6/km^{2} (63.8/sq mi)
- Time zone: UTC-5 (EST)
- Area code: +53-322
- Climate: Aw

Jimaguayú (Spanish pronunciation: [ximaɣwaˈʝu]) is a municipality and town in the Camagüey Province of Cuba.

== Demographics ==
In 2022, the municipality of Jimaguayú had a population of 19,687. With a total area of 799 km^{2} (308 sq mi), it has a population density of 25/km^{2} (65/sq mi).

== See also ==
- Jimaguayú Municipal Museum
- List of cities in Cuba
- Municipalities of Cuba
