= Mantua, Cuba =

Mantua
- Municipality
- Coat of arms

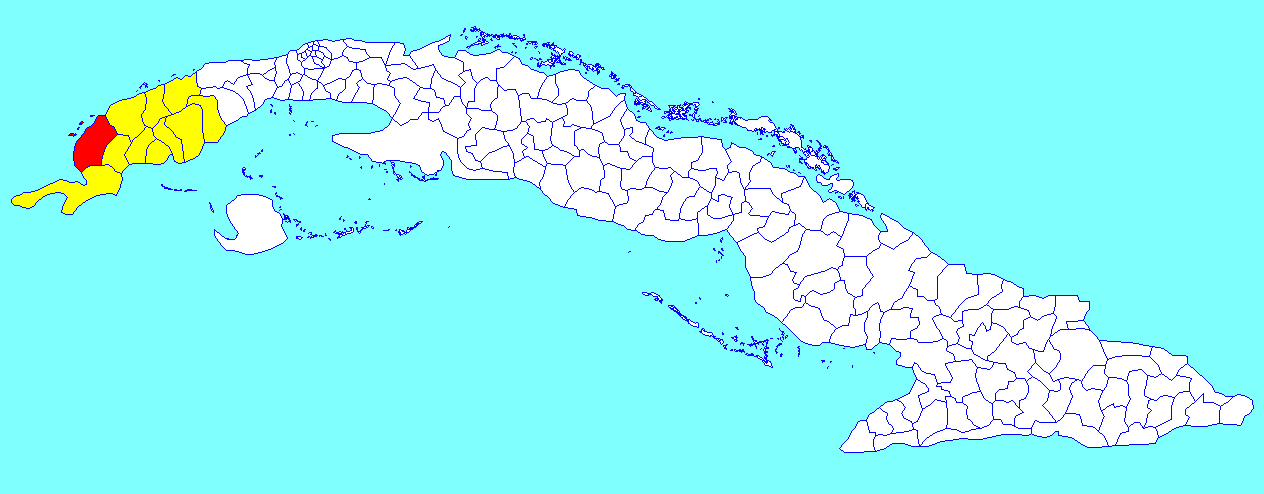
- Mantua municipality (red) within Pinar del Río Province (yellow) and Cuba
- Coordinates: 22°17′27″N 84°17′15″W
- Country: Cuba
- Province: Pinar del Río
- Founded: 1719 (Guane del Norte)
- Established: 1866

Area
  - Total: 915 km^{2} (353 sq mi)
- Elevation: 30 m (98 ft)

Population (2022)
  - Total: 23,233
  - Density: 25.4/km^{2} (65.8/sq mi)
- Time zone: UTC-5 (EST)
- Area code: +53-82

Mantua (Spanish pronunciation: [ˈmantwa]) is a municipality and town in the Pinar del Río Province of Cuba.

== History ==
It was founded in 1605 by Italian shipwrecked sailors as Mantua, Cuba. It was founded in 1719 under the name Guane del Norte. In 1866 it was established as a municipality. The settlement of Mantua is a National Monument of Cuba.

== Geography ==
The municipality is divided into the barrios of Arroyos, Bartolo, Cabezas, Coronel Pozo (Lázaro), Fidel Pedraja, Guayabo, Macurijes, Mantua, Montezuelo and Pablo Suárez.

Mantua Municipal Museum is located in the José Martí street.

== Demographics ==
In 2022, the municipality of Mantua had a population of 23,233. With a total area of 915 km^{2} (353 sq mi), it has a population density of 25/km^{2} (65/sq mi).

== Transport ==
The town is the western endpoint of the "Circuito Norte" (CN) highway.

== See also ==
- Municipalities of Cuba
- List of cities in Cuba
