= Guane 1 =

Guane One Guane Uno
- Ward
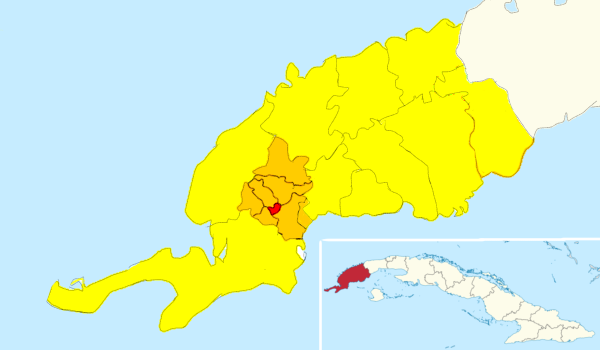
- Country: Cuba
- Province: Pinar del Río
- Municipality: Guane

Guane 1 is a ward (consejo popular) in Guane, Cuba.

== Geography ==
The ward borders the wards of Isabel Rubio, Guane 2, Portales, and Mallna.

In November 2020, the Cuyaguateje River started flooding into Guane. María Luisa Valdés Malagón, the President of the Municipal Defense Council of Guane said that the wards of Isabel Rubio, Guane 1, Guane 2, Punta de la Sierra, and La Güira where affected by the flooding of an estimated 6.30 meters.
