= Mantua Municipal Museum =

Museum in Cuba

- Museo Municipal de Mantua
- Established: 23 December 1980
- Location: Mantua, Cuba
- Director: Rodolfo Álvarez Gavilán

Mantua Municipal Museum is a museum located in the José Martí street Mantua, Cuba. The building was constructed in 1901. It was established as a museum on 23 December 1980.

It has five rooms and holds several collections on local history and newspapers, and objects of the Cuban War of Independence and the 26th July Movement.

== See also ==
- List of museums in Cuba
