= Alquízar =

- Municipality
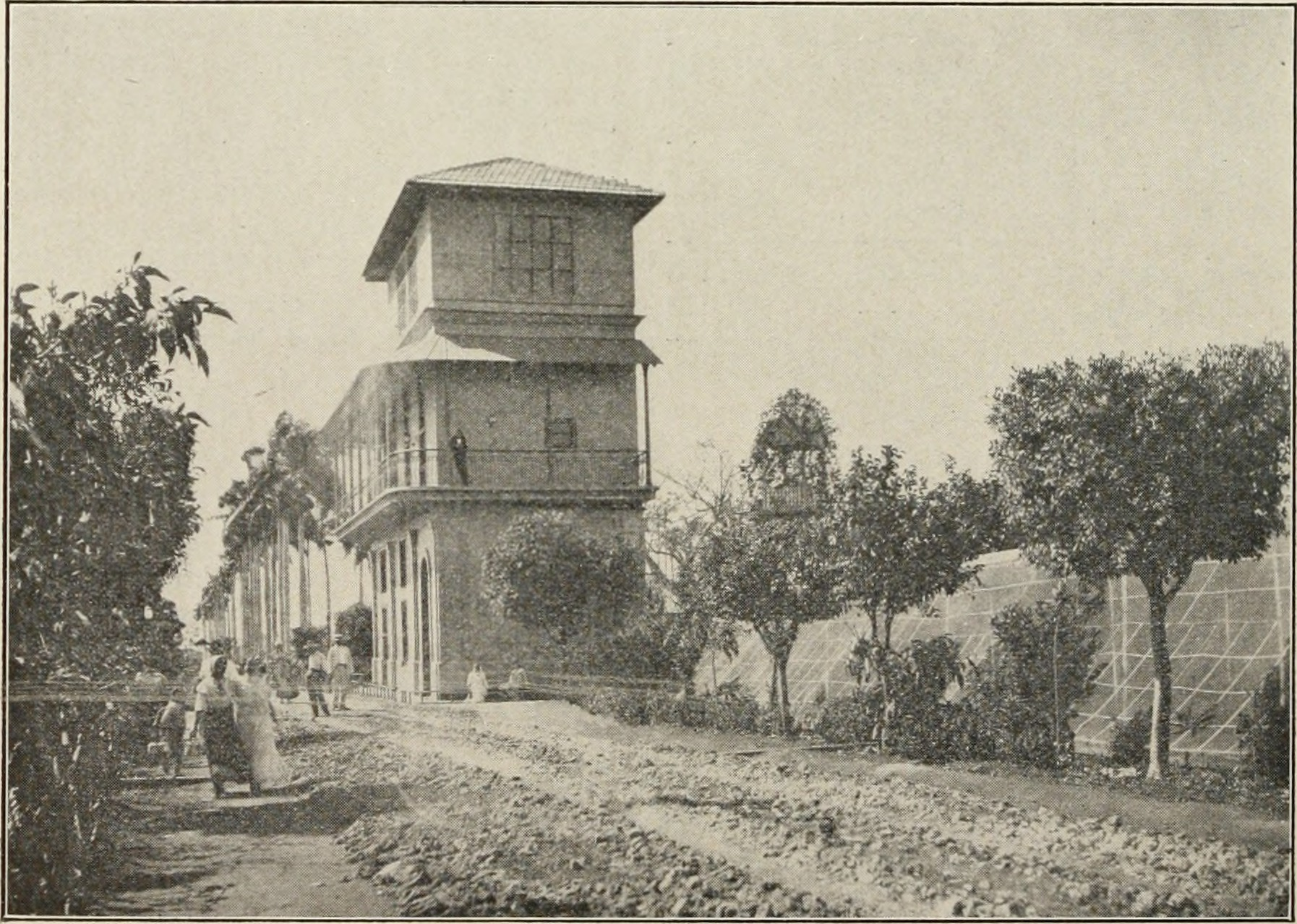
- Alquizar (1907-1931)

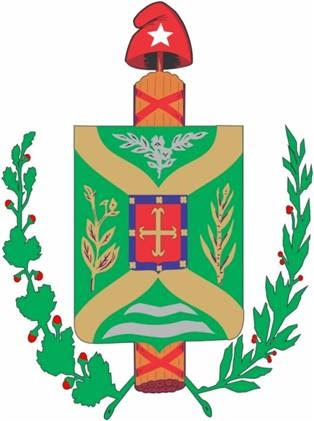
- Coat of arms

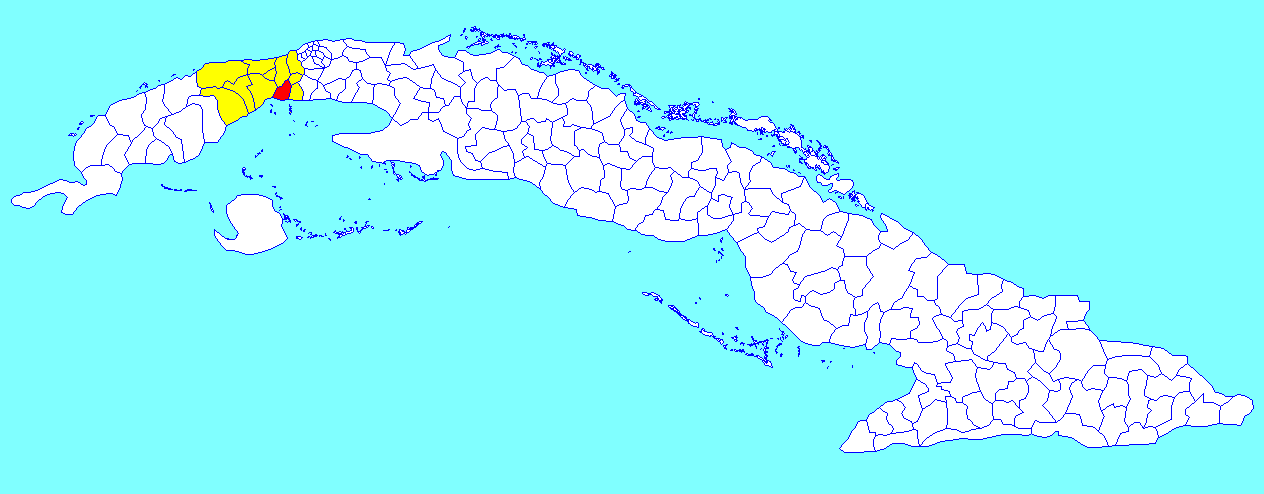
- Alquízar municipality (red) within Artemisa Province (yellow) and Cuba
- Coordinates: 22°48′24″N 82°34′58″W
- Country: Cuba
- Province: Artemisa
- Founded: 1879
- Established: January 1, 1879

Area
  - Total: 193 km^{2} (75 sq mi)
- Elevation: 25 m (82 ft)

Population (2022)
  - Total: 33,510
  - Density: 174/km^{2} (450/sq mi)
- Time zone: UTC-5 (EST)
- Area code: +53-7
- Climate: Aw

Alquízar (Spanish pronunciation: [alˈkisaɾ]) is a town and municipality in the Artemisa Province of Cuba.

== History ==
The settlement was first mentioned in 1616, as a coffee plantation owned by Don Sancho de Alquízar, who gives the name of the community. In 1826, a garrison was established here, and it was incorporated in 1879.

== Geography ==
The town is located in the south-east corner of the province, south-west of San Antonio de los Baños and west of Güira de Melena.

The municipality was formerly divided into the barrios of Guanímar, La Paz, Pueblo (capital), San Andrés and Tumbadero.

The municipality is divided into consejos populares (i.e. "popular councils"): Mayorquín Sur (main town is El Mayorquín), Norte, Dagame, and Pulido - Guanímar.

== Demographics ==
In 2022, the municipality of Alquízar had a population of 33,510. With a total area of 193 km^{2} (75 sq mi), it has a population density of 170/km^{2} (440/sq mi).

== See also ==
- Alquízar Municipal Museum
- Municipalities of Cuba
- List of cities in Cuba
