= Guane Municipal Museum =

Museum in Cuba

- Museo Municipal de Guane
- Established: 14 December 1979
- Location: Guane, Cuba

Guane Municipal Museum is a museum located in Isabel Rubio street in Guane, Cuba. It is 229.6 km away from Havana, capital of Cuba. It was established as a museum on 14 December 1979.

It holds sections on history, archeology, numismatics, weaponry, and ethnology.

== See also ==
- List of museums in Cuba
