= Museo Historico Provincial de Matanzas =

Museum in Matanzas, Cuba

Coordinates: 23.0465°N 81.5741°W

Palacio de Junco a.k.a. the Museo Histórico Provincial de Matanzas was built for the del Junco family in Matanzas between 1835 and 1838. It has housed the Museo Histórico Provincial de Matanzas since 1980. It is located at the Plaza de La Viga on Milanes Street, between Magdalena and Ayllón streets in Matanzas, Cuba. The Museo Histórico Provincial de Matanzas is home to a collection of artifacts and exhibits that resemble the past and culture of the Matanzas region. It is an outstanding example of Matanzas' 19th-century houses. Its arcades on both the ground and first floors are reminiscent of the 18th-century houses around the Plaza Vieja in Havana. At roof level is a parapet complete with ornamental urns, a typical feature of 19th century Cuban colonial architecture. Visitors and guests can explore this historic property to gain more understanding of its influence to present-day Cuba.
