= Depósito del Automóvil =

Coordinates: 23°07′55.2″N 82°21′50.4″W

The Depósito del Automóvil (automobile depository) is a museum in the Old Havana section of Havana, Cuba. It consists of a small building made up of two large rooms. The cars are maintained to prevent damage but are not restored.

Address: Calle Oficios No. 12 y Callejón de Jústiz. La Habana Vieja. Ciudad de La Habana.

== List of cars ==
- 1926 Rolls-Royce Phantom I
- 1953 MG TD
- 1920s Fiat
- Alfa Romeo roadster
- 1970s Daimler
- 1980s Chevy
- replica of a 1957 Maserati used by Juan Manuel Fangio
- Cadillac V16 1930
- 1959 Oldsmobile, owned by Commander Camilo Cienfuegos
- 1918 Ford T
- 1930 Baby Lincoln
- 1969 Citroën Méhari
- funeral carriage

== List of Motor Bikes ==
- 1977 Ducati 900SS owned by Fidel Castro

== List of Trucks ==
- 1915 Mack AC. Chain drive 3.5 ton, 4-cylinder, 4 gears

== Other Exhibits ==
- 3 fuel pumps
- a semaphore
