= San Juan y Martínez =

- Municipality
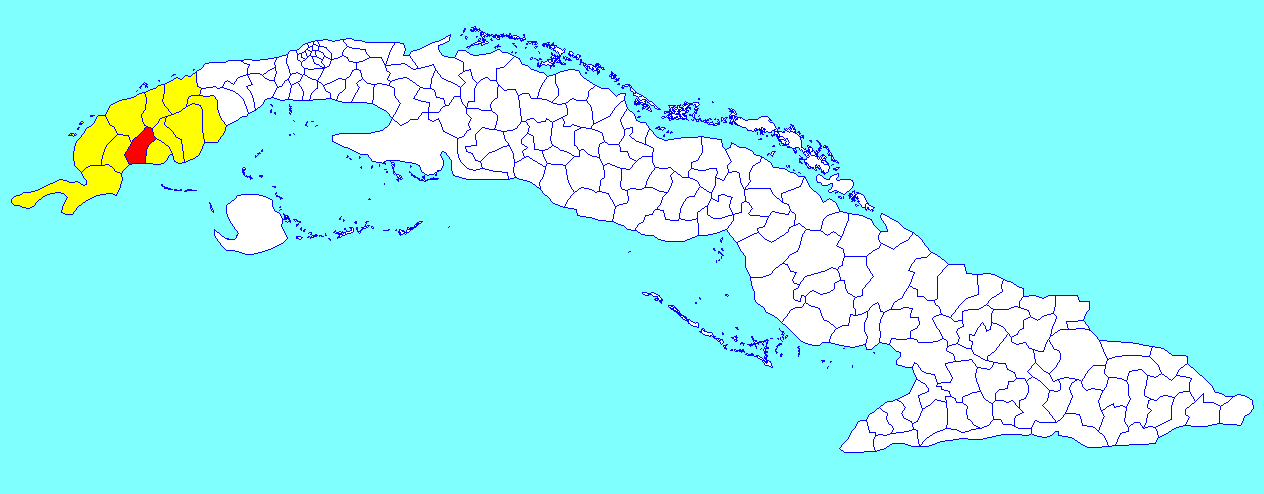
- San Juan y Martínez municipality (red) within Pinar del Río Province (yellow) and Cuba
- Coordinates: 22°16′N 83°50′W
- Country: Cuba
- Province: Pinar del Río

Area
  - Municipality: 409 km^{2} (158 sq mi)
- Elevation: 20 m (66 ft)

Population (2022)
  - Municipality: 42,109
  - Density: 103/km^{2} (267/sq mi)
  - Urban: 16,502
  - Rural: 25,607
- Time zone: UTC-5 (EST)
- Area code: +53-82

San Juan y Martínez (Spanish pronunciation: [saŋ ˈxwan i maɾˈtines]) is a municipality and town in the Pinar del Río Province of Cuba.

== Overview ==
Its economy is centered mainly on agriculture and the crop of its farmers, the largest of which being tobacco. In Cuba, San Juan y Martinez is known as the "Mecca of the Tobacco."

San Juan has its own hospital with a fully functional maternity ward as well as a "Polyclinic" treatment center, both open 24 hours.

== Demographics ==
In 2022, the municipality of San Juan y Martínez had a population of 42,109. With a total area of 409 km^{2} (158 sq mi), it has a population density of 100/km^{2} (260/sq mi).

== See also ==
- Municipalities of Cuba
- List of cities in Cuba
- San Juan y Martínez Municipal Museum
