= Bolivia, Cuba =

Bolivia
- Municipality
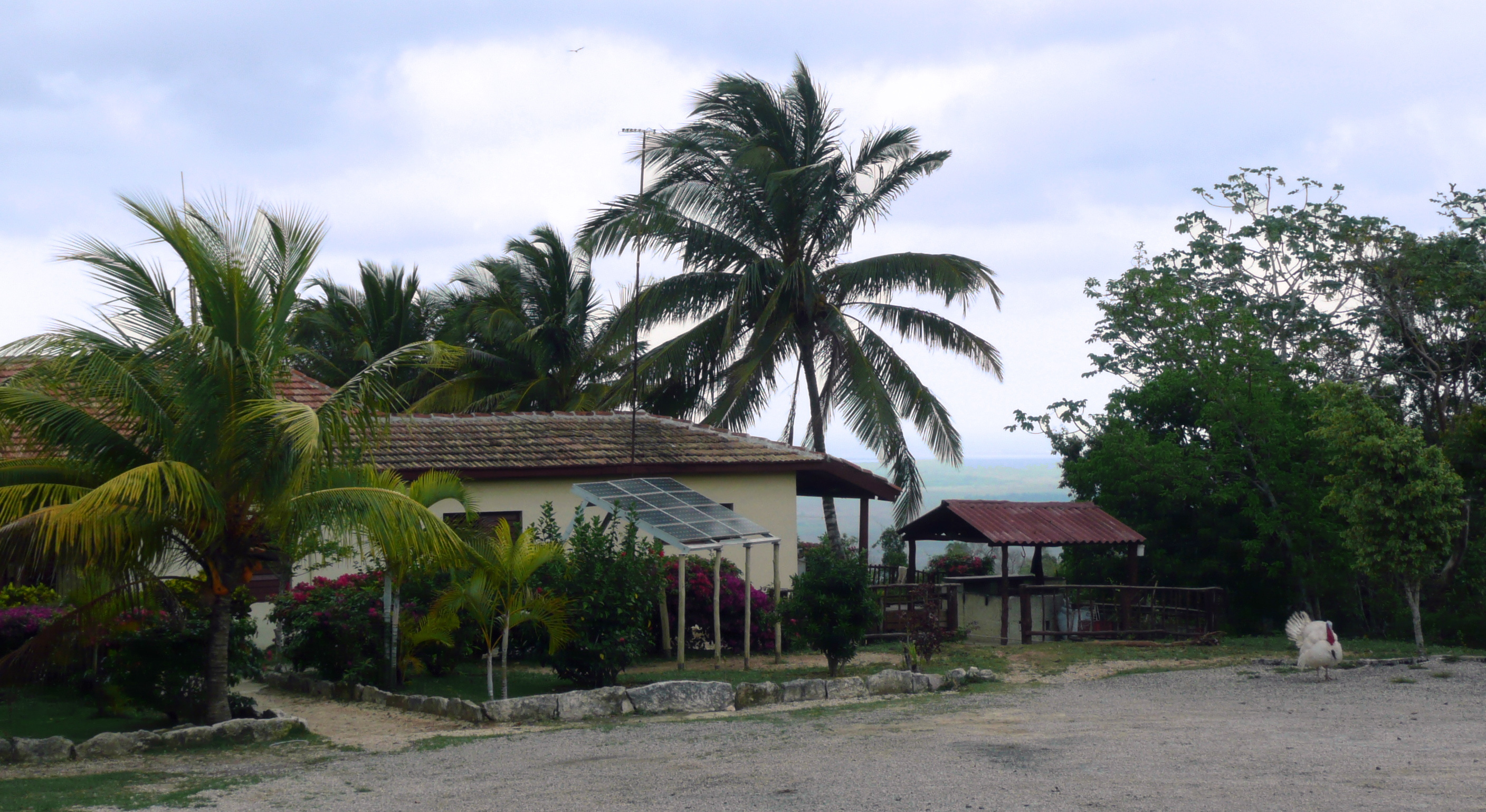
- Ecotourism station in Loma de Cunagua reserve

- Coat of arms

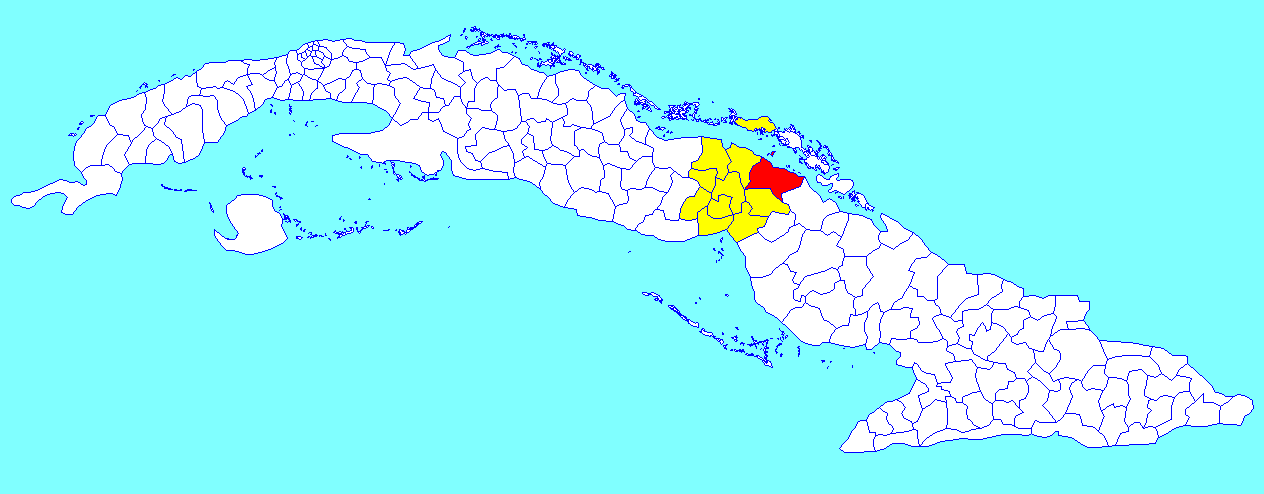
- Bolivia municipality (red) within Ciego de Ávila Province (yellow) and Cuba
- Coordinates: 22°04′30″N 78°21′1″W
- Country: Cuba
- Province: Ciego de Ávila

Area
  - Total: 918 km^{2} (354 sq mi)
- Elevation: 10 m (33 ft)

Population (2022)
  - Total: 15,055
  - Density: 16.4/km^{2} (42.5/sq mi)
- Time zone: UTC-5 (EST)
- Area code: +53-43

Bolivia is a municipality and town in the Ciego de Ávila Province of Cuba. It is located in the north-eastern part of the province, bordering the Bay of Jiguey and Cayo Romano.

== Demographics ==
In 2022, the municipality of Bolivia had a population of 15,055. With a total area of 918 km^{2} (354 sq mi), it has a population density of 16/km^{2} (41/sq mi).

== See also ==
- Municipalities of Cuba
- List of cities in Cuba
- Bolivia Municipal Museum
