= Venezuela, Cuba =

Venezuela
- Municipality
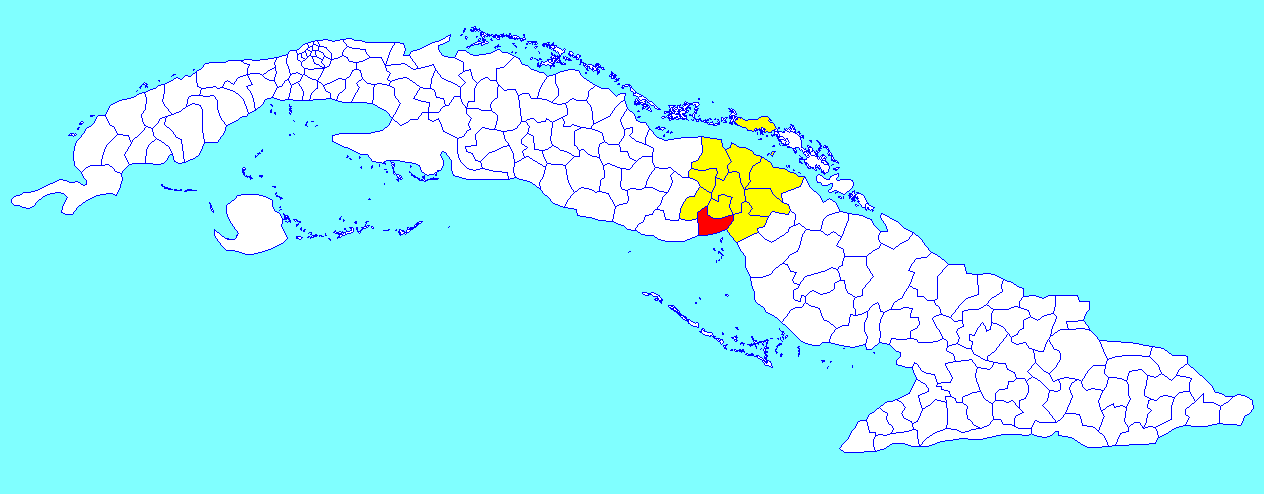
- Venezuela municipality (red) within Ciego de Ávila Province (yellow) and Cuba
- Coordinates: 21°45′4″N 78°46′45″W
- Country: Cuba
- Province: Ciego de Ávila

Area
  - Municipality: 716 km^{2} (276 sq mi)
- Elevation: 25 m (82 ft)

Population (2022)
  - Municipality: 25,377
  - Density: 35.4/km^{2} (91.8/sq mi)
  - Urban: 16,080
  - Rural: 9,297
- Time zone: UTC-5 (EST)
- Area code: +53-43
- Website: https://www.venezuelacav.gob.cu/es/

Venezuela (Spanish pronunciation: [beneˈswela]) is a municipality and town in the Ciego de Ávila Province of Cuba. It is located immediately south of the provincial capital, Ciego de Ávila.

== History ==
The territory in the colonial period of what is Venezuela was characterized by the sugar production headed by the Resurrección and La Soledad mills, Cuban War of Independence, it witnessed the struggle of the Mambises who demonstrated their combative audacity by mocking the defensive system of the Trocha from Júcaro to Morón, among its protagonists they found Máximo Gómez, who crossed it on January 6, 1875. When the struggles for independence resumed, it was the scene of different actions by Mambi chiefs such as Simón Reyes, known as the Eagle of La Trocha, and the arrival of an expedition through the Palo Alto area received by Generalissimo Gómez. In the Neocolonial stage, sugar production, port activities, livestock and the cultivation of minor fruits constituted the fundamental economic lines, sugar production was driven by the construction of the Stewart and Jagüeyal power plants (currently non-existent), in this period This time it returns to the struggles against oppression and corrupt governments led by the port and sugar sectors, the crossing of the invading column No. 8 "Ciro Redondo" under the command of Che Guevara also stands out. In these 50 years of revolution in power, its geography and quality of life of the Venezuelan inhabitants have undergone a remarkable change, an example of these is the construction of schools, family doctor's offices, hospitals, barracks converted into schools, Palacios de Pioneros, it has been possible to considerably reduce infant mortality and nothing resists in comparison with what existed before 1959.

== Demographics ==
In 2022, the municipality of Venezuela had a population of 25,377. With a total area of 716 km^{2} (276 sq mi), it has a population density of 38.2/km^{2} (99/sq mi).

== See also ==
- Venezuela Municipal Museum
- Municipalities of Cuba
- List of cities in Cuba
