= Ciro Redondo =

- Municipality
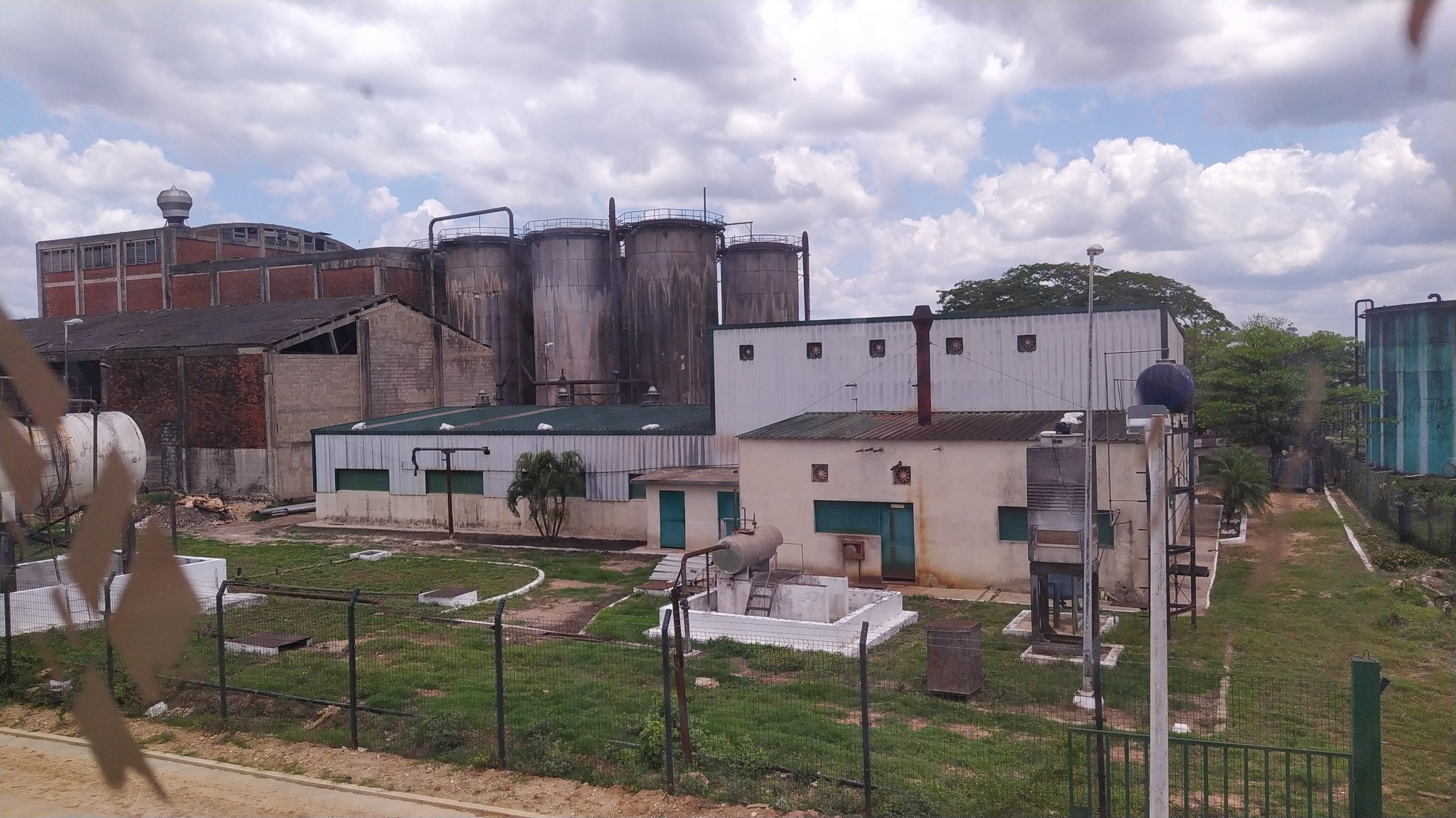
- Industrial area of Ciro Redondo

- Coat of arms

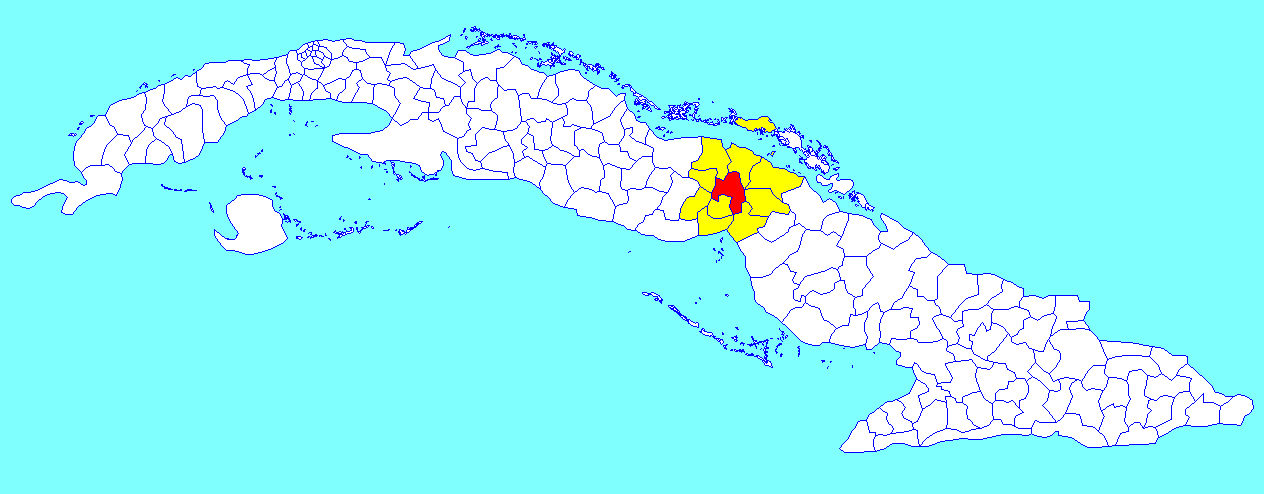
- Ciro Redondo municipality (red) within Ciego de Ávila Province (yellow) and Cuba
- Coordinates: 22°01′8″N 78°42′11″W
- Country: Cuba
- Province: Ciego de Ávila

Area
  - Total: 588 km^{2} (227 sq mi)
- Elevation: 45 m (148 ft)

Population (2022)
  - Total: 30,125
  - Density: 51.2/km^{2} (133/sq mi)
- Time zone: UTC-5 (EST)
- Area code: +53-43
- Website: https://www.ciroredondo.gob.cu/es/

Ciro Redondo is a municipality and town in the Ciego de Ávila Province of Cuba. It is located halfway between the cities of Ciego de Ávila and Morón and was named after Ciro Redondo (Revolutionary).

== Demographics ==
In 2022, the municipality of Ciro Redondo had a population of 30,125. With a total area of 588 km^{2} (227 sq mi), it has a population density of 51/km^{2} (130/sq mi).

== See also ==
- Ciro Redondo Municipal Museum
- Municipalities of Cuba
- List of cities in Cuba
