= Baraguá =

- Municipality
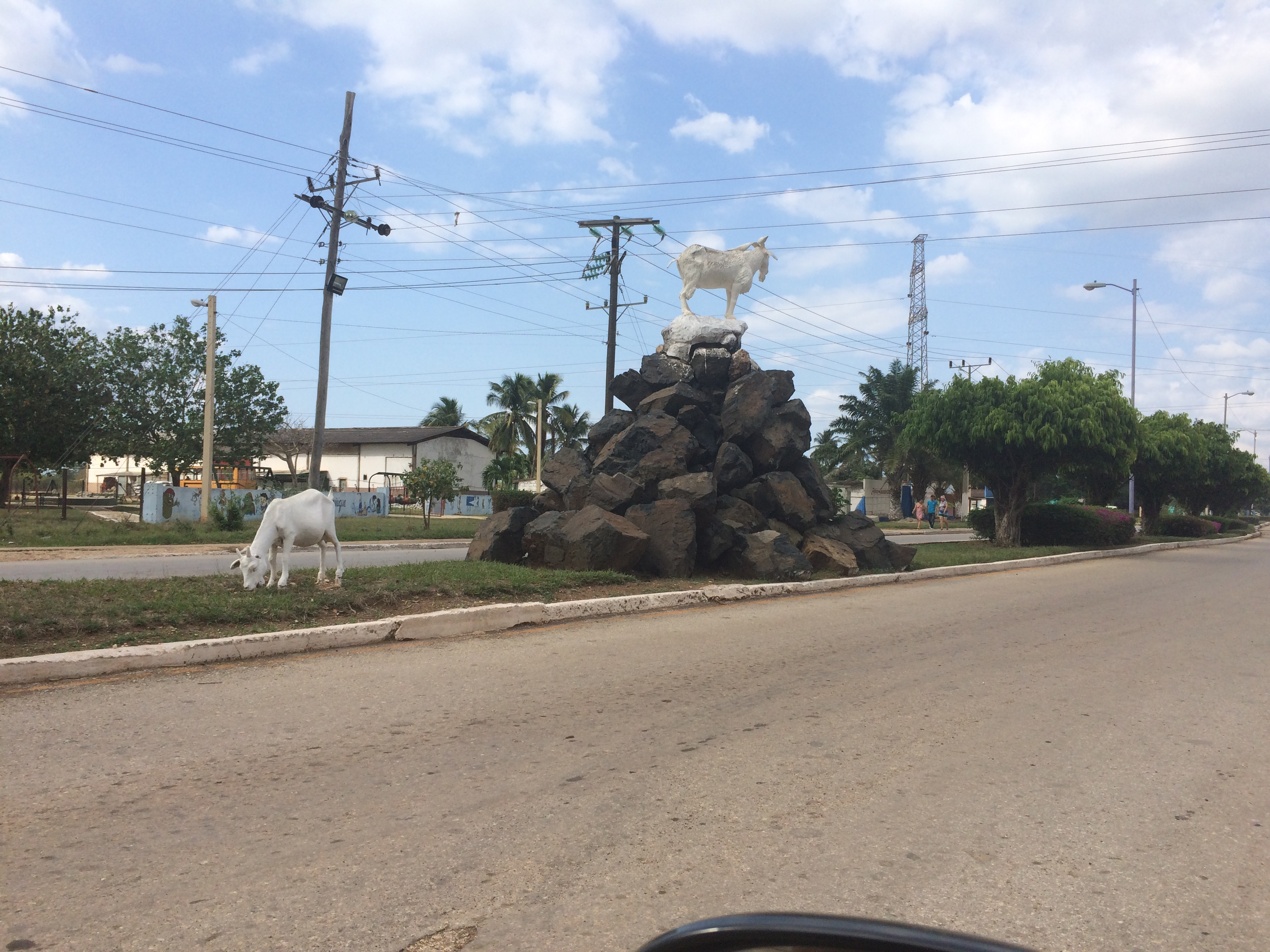
- Gaspar, Cuba

- Coat of arms

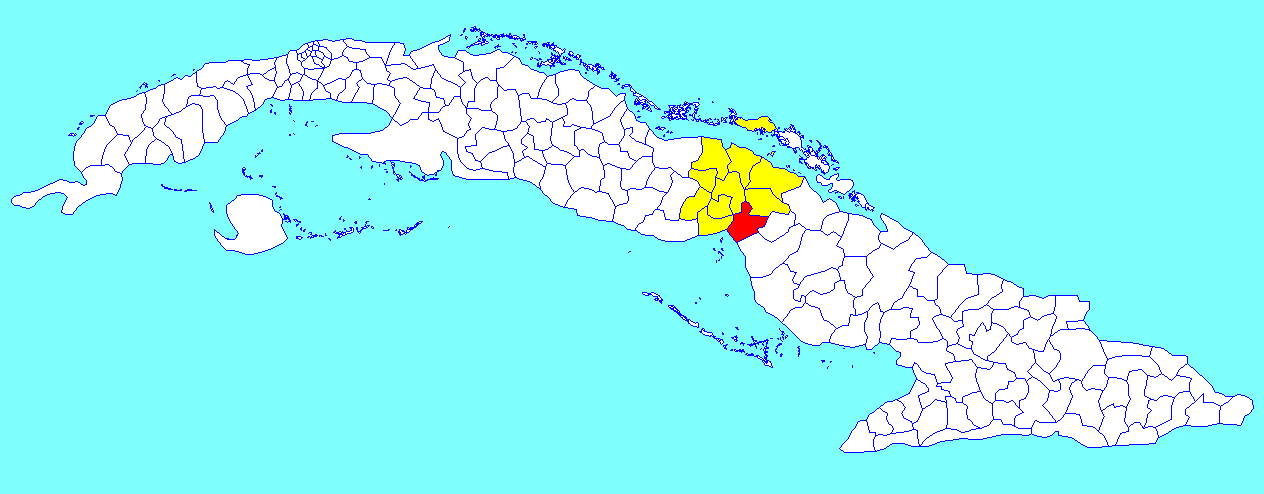
- Baraguá municipality (red) within Ciego de Ávila Province (yellow) and Cuba
- Coordinates: 21°40′55″N 78°37′28″W
- Country: Cuba
- Province: Ciego de Ávila
- Seat: Gaspar

Area
  - Total: 728 km^{2} (281 sq mi)
- Elevation: 5 m (16 ft)

Population (2022)
  - Total: 31,361
  - Density: 43.1/km^{2} (112/sq mi)
- Time zone: UTC-5 (EST)
- Area code: +53-43
- Website: https://www.baragua.gob.cu/es/

Baraguá (Spanish pronunciation: [baɾaˈɣwa]) is a municipality and town in the Ciego de Ávila Province of Cuba. Its administrative seat is located in the town of Gaspar.

== Geography ==
The municipality occupies the south-eastern part of the province, and the area is dominated by mangrove.

== Demographics ==
In 2022, the municipality of Baraguá had a population of 31,361. With a total area of 728 km^{2} (281 sq mi), it has a population density of 43/km^{2} (110/sq mi).

== See also ==
- Municipalities of Cuba
- List of cities in Cuba
- Baraguá Municipal Museum
