= Esmeralda, Cuba =

Esmeralda
- Municipality
- Coat of arms

- Esmeralda municipality (red) within Camagüey Province (orange) and Cuba
- Coordinates: 21°51′22″N 78°06′41″W
- Country: Cuba
- Province: Camagüey
- Established: 1928

Area
  - Total: 1,480 km^{2} (570 sq mi)
- Elevation: 35 m (115 ft)

Population (2022)
  - Total: 29,203
  - Density: 19.7/km^{2} (51.1/sq mi)
- Time zone: UTC-5 (EST)
- Area code: +53-322
- Climate: Aw
- Website: https://esmeralda.gob.cu/

Esmeralda is a municipality and town in the Camagüey Province of Cuba.

== Geography ==
The municipality is divided into the barrios of Brasil (also known as Jaronú), Caonao, Guanaja, Quemado and Tabor.

Cayo Romano, one of the cays of Jardines del Rey archipelago is located north of Esmeralda, across the Bay of la Jiguey (Bahia de Jiguey).

== Demographics ==
In 2022, the municipality of Esmeralda had a population of 29,203. With a total area of 1,480 km^{2} (570 sq mi), it has a population density of 20/km^{2} (52/sq mi).

== Economy ==
The economy is based on crops of sugarcane, coconuts, pineapple, oranges and tobacco.

== See also ==
- Esmeralda Municipal Museum
- holguin Santia gode cuba havana
- Municipalities of Cuba
