= The Rehabilitation Center at Hollywood Hills =

Former nursing home in Florida

Coordinates: 26.0214°N 80.1798°W

The Rehabilitation Center at Hollywood Hills was a private nursing home in Hollywood, Florida, United States, with 152 beds. It was acquired by Hollywood Property Investments in 2015 following a bankruptcy proceeding.

The facility provided advanced nursing care, 24-hour care, tube feeding, and nutritional management.

== Hurricane Irma ==
After the air-conditioning system failed because of a power outage during Hurricane Irma in 2017, several residents suffered from hyperthermia inside the facility, resulting in the deaths of eight people. Power was lost on Sunday evening. The nursing home contacted authorities multiple times seeking assistance and was reportedly told that it was being prioritized for power restoration. The nursing home was not listed on Florida Power & Light's (FPL) priority restoration list, and at the time of the incident there were no state requirements for generators capable of powering air conditioning systems in nursing homes.

The Agency for Health Care Administration imposed a moratorium on admissions at the facility. The nursing home was also removed from Medicaid. The Hollywood Police Department and the Florida Department of Law Enforcement opened a criminal investigation into the deaths. In a press release, the company stated that "The Center and its medical and administrative staff diligently prepared for the impact of Hurricane Irma."

In October 2017, Governor Rick Scott implemented emergency rules requiring assisted living facilities and nursing homes to have generators capable of operating air-conditioning systems for up to four days during power outages. On November 22, 2017, 12 deaths at the nursing home were ruled homicides caused by heat exposure. During depositions, both medical examiners stated that they did not follow national guidelines for determining the manner and cause of death in heat emergencies. Dr. Jeffrey Jentzen, an author of those guidelines, testified that the deaths would not have been classified as homicides had the guidelines been applied.

Hearings regarding the potential permanent revocation of the nursing home's license began on January 29, 2018.

The deaths at the Hollywood Hills nursing home prompted legislative responses from Florida lawmakers. Governor Scott signed an executive order requiring nursing facilities to develop plans to supply emergency power for four days in the event of power outages. Representative Frederica Wilson proposed legislation requiring all nursing and assisted-living facilities to have backup generators capable of powering air conditioning systems. Senator Lauren Book subsequently filed a bill that would require such facilities to operate on generator power for five days. Approximately twelve bills related to nursing home emergency power requirements were introduced during the 2018 Florida legislative session.

== Closure ==
On Wednesday, September 20, 2017, the Florida Agency for Health Care Administration (AHCA) issued an emergency order suspending the facility's license to operate following the deaths that occurred in the aftermath of Hurricane Irma. The nursing home closed permanently the same day, resulting in the layoff of 245 employees.

== Government coverup ==
Researchers at Brown University reported that government officials significantly undercounted the number of deaths among Florida nursing home residents following Hurricane Irma in 2017.

David Dosa, MD, MPH, an associate professor of medicine and of health services, policy, and practice, analyzed mortality data from Florida nursing homes during the 30 days following the Category 4 hurricane and compared it with the same period in 2015, a year without hurricanes in the state. Writing in JAMA Network Open, he reported that the estimated death toll was more than double the figure reported by the Centers for Disease Control and Prevention (CDC).

The study found that Hurricane Irma was associated with significant increases in mortality and hospitalization among Florida's 61,564 nursing home residents. Compared with 2015, the researchers identified an additional 262 deaths at 30 days after exposure and 433 additional deaths at 90 days. The number of deaths within 30 days of exposure exceeded the 123 deaths reported by the CDC for the entire population of Florida by 139.

Dosa, whose research focuses on disaster management in the long-term care sector, stated that nursing homes should receive higher priority in emergency planning and response.

According to reporting, the State of Florida sought to block the nursing home from obtaining certain mortality data through a public records request, citing potential privacy concerns. This action reportedly prevented the facility from using the information during related civil proceedings. Dosa later obtained the data through Centers for Medicare & Medicaid Services (CMS) records, though it was reportedly too late for inclusion in the civil proceedings.

== Criminal proceedings ==
Criminal charges were initially filed against the facility's charge nurse, a floor nurse, a licensed practical nurse, and the administrator. In September 2022, criminal charges against three nurses were dropped, approximately three years after they were filed.

Defense attorneys argued that the case was procedurally flawed, stating that the Hollywood Police Department filed charges without involvement from the State Attorney's Office. Counsel for the remaining defendant, administrator Jorge Carballo, criticized the prosecution and alleged misconduct, including asserting that homicide determinations were politically motivated. During depositions, medical examiners testified that homicide determinations were made by supervisors prior to the completion of autopsies and that they were instructed to rely on information from the Hollywood Police Department rather than nationally recognized criteria used to determine the manner and cause of death.

On February 24, 2023, Carballo was acquitted. The presiding judge ruled that the prosecution's case lacked sufficient evidence to allow a reasonable jury to convict.

== See also ==
- Effects of Hurricane Irma in Florida
