= Kilo 9 =

- Village
- Location of Kilo 9 in Cuba
- Coordinates: 22°18′39.24″N 78°47′44.88″W
- Country: Cuba
- Province: Ciego de Ávila
- Municipality: Chambas
- Founded: 1930
- Time zone: UTC-5 (EST)
- Area code: +53-43

Kilo 9 is a village in the Ciego de Ávila Province of Cuba part of the municipality of Chambas.

== Geography ==
Kilo 9 is located in the northwest plain of Chambas municipality which covers over 35 square kilometres (14 sq mi). It is bordered by Loma de Cunagua on the east, Alturas de Florencia on the west, Nauvy Bay on the north and Alturas de Pina on the south. The village is 26 km from Morón.

One small river crosses nearby; the Rio Del Calvario (40 km) which runs from the Lake of Virgil to the Laguna de Leche (i.e. "Milky Lake"), in Morón.

== History ==
It was established around 1930's by the Fallas-Gutierrez sugar company when an 18 kilometers railroad was built across, which runs from Adelaida Sugar mill (Fallas) to the Port of Chicola. There was placed a sugar cane loader crane, pulled by bulls, to transfer cane from animal-drawn carriages to railroad wagons. It took the name of Kilo 9 since the crane was located at the Kilometer mark 9. The first inhabitants were Haitian and Jamaican immigrants who worked in the sugar cane plantations. During the Castro revolution in 1964, 100 modern houses were built. Electricity arrived in 1965 and new machinery replaced the previous agricultural system including the replacement of the crane by a huge cane processing station powered by electricity. The village was destroyed by Hurricane Kate on November 20, 1985. Today it is an inhospitable place roamed only by cattle. Nearby villages are Kilo 12, Jucaral, Kilo 8, San Juan, La Teresa, Ceiba.

== Economy ==
Mostly based on sugar cane plantation, and cattle.

== See also ==
- Falla (Chambas)
- Municipalities of Cuba
- List of cities in Cuba
