= Falla (Chambas) =

Falla (Enrique Varona)
- Village
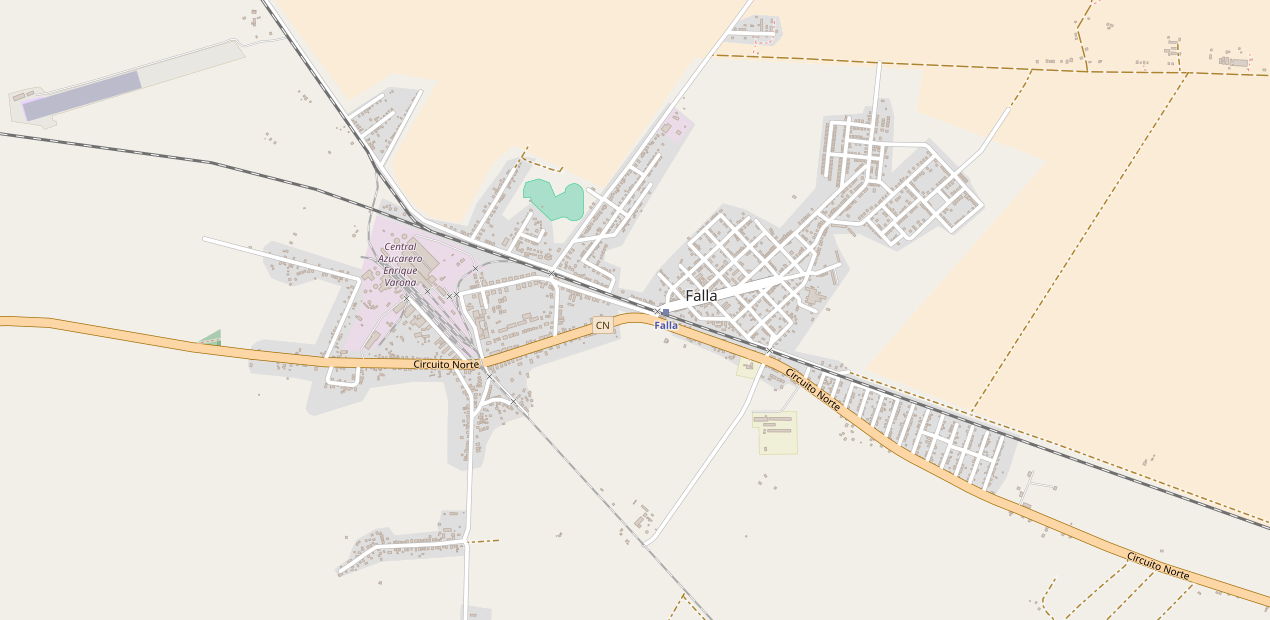
- OSM map showing Falla

- Location of Falla in Cuba
- Coordinates: 22°10′13.4″N 78°47′14.0″W
- Country: Cuba
- Province: Ciego de Ávila
- Municipality: Chambas
- Founded: 1912
- Elevation: 40 m (130 ft)
- Time zone: UTC-5 (EST)
- Area code: +53-43

Falla is a Cuban village and consejo popular ("people's council", i.e. hamlet) of the municipality of Chambas, in Ciego de Ávila Province.

== History ==
Falla was founded in 1912 as the hacienda Nauyús y Cacarratas, owned by Pepe Planas, a man linked to Falla-Gutiérrez sugar company. After his death (shot by unknown), the Laureano Falla-Gutiérrez Association, which would extend it for the delivery of land made by the President of the Republic, Alfredo Zayas, was in charge of the hacienda. The concession of the latifundium extended the sugarcane monoculture in the area and, with it, the development of the current urban settlement.

== Geography ==
Located on a rural plain, southwest of Laguna de Leche (9 km far) and south of the Bay of Buena Vista (28 km from Punta San Juan), Falla spans across the state highway "Circuito Norte" and the railway. The western old settlement develops around the sugar factory, the eastern new area grows mainly to the north of the train station.

The village is 15 km from Tamarindo, 17 from Chambas, 18 from Morón, 24 from Ciro Redondo, 28 from Florencia, 41 from Ciego de Ávila and 81 from Cayo Coco. The nearest settlements are the villages El Calvario (6 km west) and Ranchuelo (7 km east).

== Economy ==
The main economic activity is represented by the sugar industry. The sugar refinery "Enrique Varona" (Central Azucarero Enrique Varona Gonzáles), founded in 1915 as Central Adelaida, is a large complex with its own industrial railway line.

== Transport ==
Falla is crossed in the middle by the state highway "Circuito Norte" (CN). It counts a railway station on the Santa Clara-Camajuaní-Morón-Nuevitas line, with local and long-distance trains, connecting the village with Havana as well. Falla station is also the terminus of three minor branch lines: one to Kilo 9 and Punta San Juan (Maxímo Gómez), another (closed) to Chicola (by the Laguna de Leche), and a third one (industrial) to Ciro Redondo, on the Morón-Ciego de Ávila line. This one serves the sugar refinery "Enrique Varona".

== See also ==
- Chambas Municipal Museum
- Municipalities of Cuba
- List of cities in Cuba
