= Chambas =

- Municipality
- Coat of arms

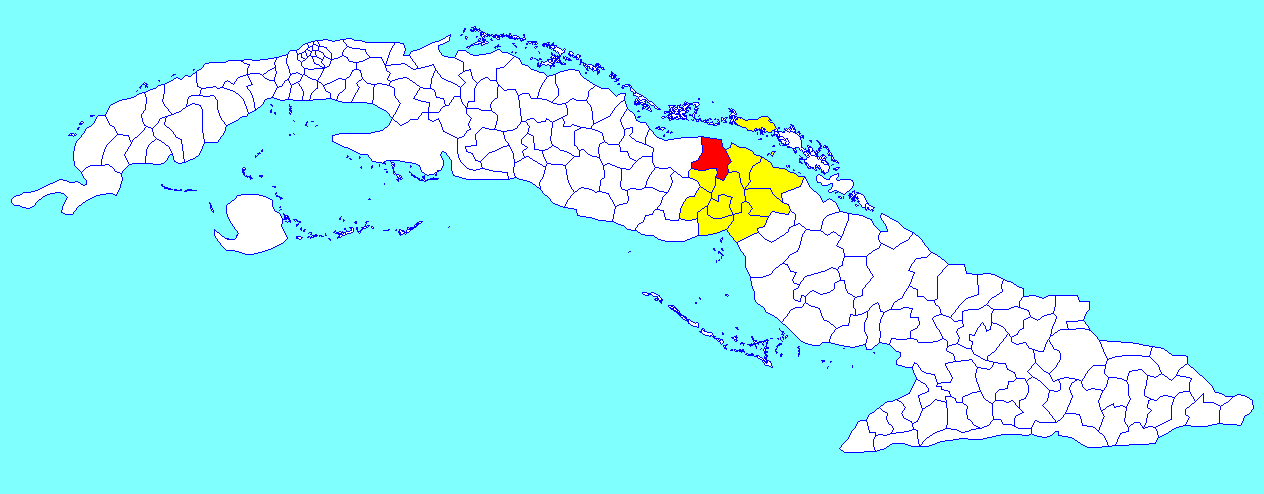
- Chambas municipality (red) within Ciego de Ávila Province (yellow) and Cuba
- Coordinates: 22°11′48″N 78°54′48″W
- Country: Cuba
- Province: Ciego de Ávila

Area
  - Total: 769 km^{2} (297 sq mi)
- Elevation: 40 m (130 ft)

Population (2022)
  - Total: 36,239
  - Density: 47.1/km^{2} (122/sq mi)
- Time zone: UTC-5 (EST)
- Area code: +53-43
- Website: https://chambas.gob.cu/es/

Chambas is a municipality and town in the Ciego de Ávila Province of Cuba. It emerged in 1976 with the new political-administrative division, occupies an area of 770.08 km², including 12 km² of adjacent cays, which ranks it second in the province in terms of surface area. It has a population of 39,085 inhabitants, with a density of 54.5 inhabitants per square kilometer, lower than the provincial average. However, it is one of the municipalities with the highest population density in the province, surpassed only by the municipalities of Ciego de Ávila, Morón, and Florencia.

== History ==
According to some preserved historical data, upon the arrival of the Spanish conquistadors to the territory of the current municipality of Chambas, they encountered several groups of indigenous people. Currently, several areas showing signs of having been inhabited by indigenous people are being studied, examples of these places are:

- Nauyú aboriginal settlement, near the town of "El Calvario".
- Santa Clarita aboriginal settlement, next to the springs of the Aguas Azules tourist center.
- Mabuya aboriginal settlement, located next to the bridge of the stream that runs east of the town.
- Buchillones aboriginal settlement between Punta Alegre and the Máximo Gómez sugar mill.

Currently, a recovery and conservation of pieces found in the aforementioned sites are being carried out in the municipality as evidence of the indigenous populations that existed in the Chambas area, which can be seen in the municipal museum.

== Geography ==
It is located in the northern part of the province, bordering the municipalities of Morón and Florencia, as well as the province of Sancti Spíritus. To the north it borders the Bay of Buena Vista and the Laguna de Leche. It comprises the villages of El Asiento, El Calvario, Falla, Kilo 9, Las Palmas, Los Perros, Mabuya, Piedra, Punta Alegre, Punta San Juan (Maxímo Gómez Sugar Mill) and Ranchuelo.

== Localities ==
Localities and Settlements of Chambas

- Andreita 25.
- Anguillero.
- Vigil.
- El Calvario.
- El Asiento.
- Falla.
- Coralia.
- Dos Hermanas.
- Granja.
- Julito.
- Libertad.
- Mangas.
- Máximo Gómez.
- La Nenita.
- La Oriental.
- La Pedrera.
- Piedra.
- Portada Espinosa.
- Punta Alegre.
- Rivero.
- Ruano.
- Sabana del Medio.
- San Joaquín.
- Santa Clarita.
- Veguitas.
- Biscusia.
- Nelly.
- La Gallería.
- La Pica Pica.
- La 30.
- Sitio Molina.
- Los Cacaos.
- Paso Real.

== Demographics ==
In 2022, the municipality of Chambas had a population of 36,239. With a total area of 769 km^{2} (297 sq mi), it has a population density of 47/km^{2} (120/sq mi).

== Education ==
The educational system of the municipality is composed of nurseries, primary schools, secondary schools, special attention schools, vocational schools, adult education, as well as improvement courses, which make up a student body of approximately 7,258 students. It also has education workers, approximately 1,758 specialists.

== Health ==
In the health system, it has a teaching polyclinic with advanced services for population care. It also has several medical offices distributed in various locations to also provide service to the population. In total, there are approximately 1480 specialists in the health field in the municipality.

== Culture ==
The municipality of Chambas is well known for its rich cultural traditions, mainly for the renowned "parrandas chamberas" (Chamberas festivities). This festival consists of dividing into two neighborhoods, and each one creates its own float, which are shown together to the neighbors, and a jury decides which neighborhood is the winner. These neighborhoods are Gallo and Gavilán.

Furthermore, traditions extend to the town of Punta Alegre. In addition to having festivities where the neighborhoods are represented by "El Yeso" and "La Salina," they also hold an annual aquatic carnival where participants can view a parade of floats by the sea.

== Economy ==
The territory has strong points in the economic sector, an example of this is the sugar mill located in the town of Falla, belonging to the municipality of Chambas. This company fulfills its sugar delivery plan every year, providing significant income to the municipal economy. Additionally, tobacco cultivation is thriving in the municipality.

Another strong point of the municipality's economy is the gypsum factory, which is located in the town of Punta Alegre. This industry was renovated in recent years and is now in full productive capacity again.

== See also ==
- Chicola
- Chambas Municipal Museum
- Municipalities of Cuba
- List of cities in Cuba
