= Dual economy of Cuba =

Differing policies for locals and foreigners

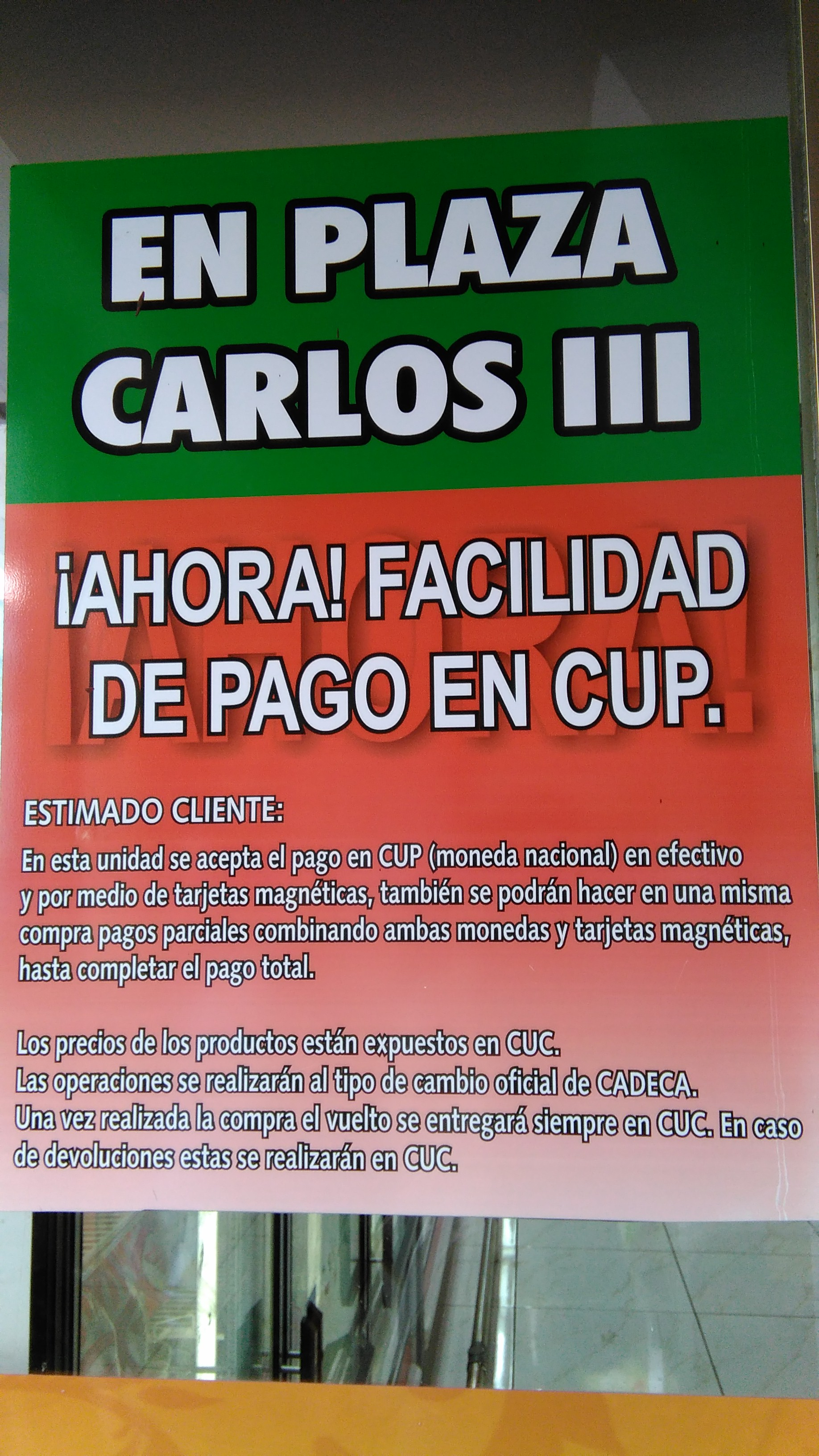
Sign in Havana informing people on how to pay in CUC currency

The dual economy of Cuba was developed after the dissolution of the Soviet Union, which caused major economic changes on the island. Tourism was regarded as the only stable sector of the Cuban economy and became the subject of policy changes to enhance its development. Cuba legalized the use of the US dollar and created a dual currency system, one based on the dollar and the Cuban convertible peso (CUC) with the other system based on the Cuban peso (CUP). Different institutions and businesses operated on only one side of the currency divide. The Cuban peso, used mostly by Cuban nationals, could not buy imported goods. The goal of the dual economy was to create one economic sphere designed to use foreign investment, while keeping it separate from the other economic sphere of domestic activities.

The dual economy involved various policies that divided Cuban nationals and foreigners. These systems dividing tourist facilities, currencies, and healthcare, have been informally termed "tourism apartheid,"dollar apartheid", and "medical apartheid".

Since 2020 Cuba began to suffer under an economic crisis that had not been seen since the Special Period. To try to revitalize the economy, the CUC currency was eliminated in 2021; instead, the Cuban peso is directly convertible to US dollars.

== History ==
=== Special period ===
With the dissolution of the Soviet Union in 1991, Cuba lost much of its Soviet financial aid which it had become dependent on. The loss of Soviet trade which comprised 80% of the islands foreign trade, created an economic crisis called the "Special Period" in Cuba which was defined by mass shortages. The Cuban government quickly began focusing on developing tourism on the island as the only economic sector that was believed to be able to regrow the Cuban economy.

By 1990, the Cuban government began floating the idea of formal segregation between foreigners and Cuban nationals. Between 1992 and 1997 it was a crime for a Cuban national to even associate with a foreigner. After condemnation by human rights groups, Cuba changed policy and now associating with tourists is an informal taboo that often results in police harassment. Most of the tourist facilities developed since the 1990s are all-inclusive resorts concentrated together in enclaves on the Cuban coast. The construction of geographically separated resorts, restrictions on Cuban nationals entering tourist facilities, and the prohibition on associating with foreigners have led critics to speculate that the Cuban government worries about the political consequences of encounters between Cubans and foreigners.

On 5 August 1994 protests erupted in Havana. These protests had been built up by years of Cuban nationals receiving visits from their exiled relatives who were observed to be much more financially successful, as well as the luxurious lifestyle possessed by many of the island's new tourists. These factors had driven in the idea that Cuban nationals were suffering under a worse standard of living not experienced by those outside the island.

After the protests, Cubans were allowed to legally possess US dollars and shop at Dollar stores. This new dollar economy mostly benefited white Cubans who were more likely than black Cubans to find work in lucrative tourism jobs or have family in the United States who could send remittances. The Cuban government also legalized the ability for Cubans to open small private businesses.

=== After the special period ===
Cuban nationals were not permitted to stay at hotels for foreigners until policy was reformed in 2008.

In January 2021, a process of currency unification began, with Cuban citizens being given six months to exchange their remaining CUCs at a rate of one to every 24 CUPs. On 15 June 2021, it was announced that the CUC would remain exchangeable in banks for a further six months but that no shops would accept them from 1 July. The final date for exchanging CUCs was 30 December 2021.

== Laws and practices ==
There were various practical applications of the dual economy and many informal popular titles have been developed from them. Most of these informal titles utilize the term "apartheid" to describe the policies.

Cuban nationals were once prohibited from entering all tourist facilities except as employees, and the entire tourist economy operates under the Cuban convertible peso, which was originally illegal for Cuban nationals to use. This practice of segregation has been informally called "tourist apartheid". Since its inception the prohibitions were reformed and Cuban nationals were then allowed to use the Cuban convertible peso.

The once prohibition to use the CUC by Cuban nationals and the later material inequality caused by most luxury goods only being accessible in the dollar economy had led critics to name the currency system "dollar apartheid".

The Cuban government also promotes its healthcare facilities for the use of foreign customers, which has been charged to limit the healthcare of Cuban nationals for the preference of foreigners. This medical system has been informally labeled "medical apartheid" by critics.

== Effects ==
=== Black market ===
Many necessities that all citizens need can be found in Cuba's dollar stores. This has caused a greater need for dollars among the Cuban populace; however, the government only pays its employees in the Cuban peso. This leaves official jobs that pay in dollars only to be found in tourism or other foreign enterprises. The demand for dollars without ample jobs paying in dollars has caused much of the Cuban populace to turn to the black market to supplement their income.

=== "Inverted pyramid" ===
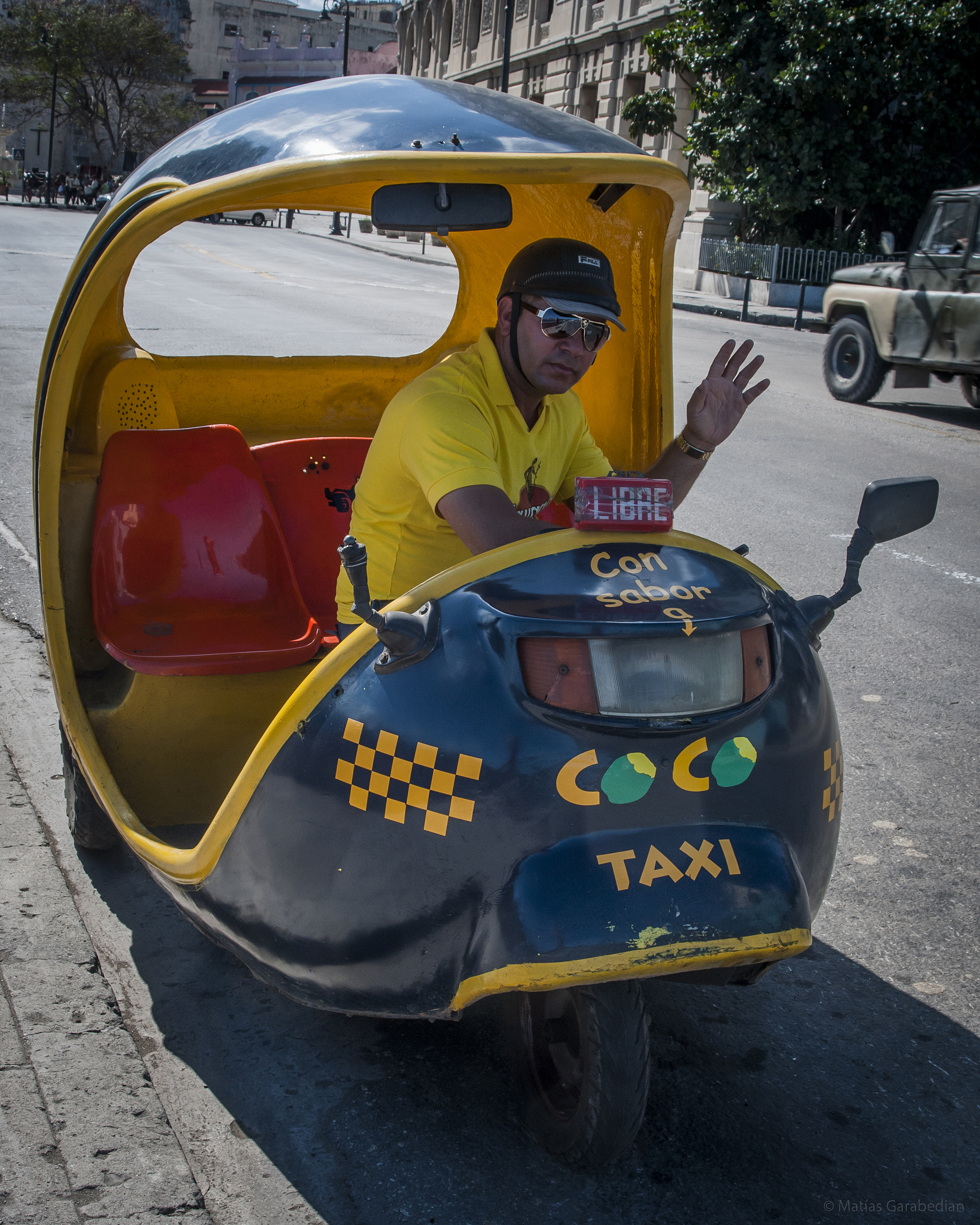
Cocotaxi with driver, in Havana. Tourist-facing jobs, like driving taxis, are some of the highest paying jobs in Cuba.

The emergence of the dual economy had a major impact on the underlying egalitarianism espoused by the Cuban revolution. Two parallel economies and societies quickly emerged, divided by their access to the newly legalized U.S. dollar. Those having access to dollars through contact with the lucrative tourist industry suddenly found themselves at a distinct financial advantage over professional, industrial and agricultural workers.

Since US Dollars and the CUC are the more valuable currency they are more sought after in the general economy. Most jobs that pay in CUC are in tourism. Thus, other professionals such as doctors, who do not work in tourism, only make a fraction of the income of hotel workers. Many professionals often try to moonlight in the tourism industry to make up the difference in income. This state of affairs has been referred to as the "inverted pyramid" by Cuban nationals to characterize the inverted income return on education that well-educated professionals face on the island.

=== Internal migration ===
As tourism played an increasing role in the economy, a large percentage of young people migrate to resort towns seeking employment in the tourism industry. Many of them working in menial jobs can earn more through tips than they can employed as professionals. Thus, there is an economic and social divide emerging in Cuba between those employed in the tourist industry and others.

Researchers find that the flocking of citizens to tourist regions such as Havana creates ‘tourist bubbles.’ This means that the isolated areas of the country visible to tourists are well-maintained and developed to meet expectations of an ‘authentic’ experience while residents of surrounding areas continue to struggle with poverty, crime, and general deterioration of living conditions. Since jobs in the tourist sector are so lucrative, these areas experience an incredible influx of residents which cannot possibly be supported by the number of opportunities in the legal job market. As such, many of the citizens who flood tourist areas turn to illicit alternatives such as prostitution or unlicensed self-employment (often taxi services, currency exchange, casas particulares, etc.)

=== Racial inequality ===
Afro-Cubans have been noted to have been put at a greater disadvantage in the dual economy. Afro-Cubans are less likely to get dollar remittances from family abroad since most Cuban exiles living abroad are white and are less likely to be small farmers who can sell their surplus foods in the dollar economy. Many of the Palestino migrants to Havana were Afro-Cuban, and Palestinos were often blamed for the rising crime rates in the 1990s, for this reason many Afro-Cubans face discrimination and frequent police harassment in Havana.

Many coveted tourism jobs in the Cuban economy are under the management of foreign investors. While all government enterprises in Cuba are formally dedicated to not practice discrimination in hiring, foreign investors are allowed to hire based on personal standards of "suitability". This legalized practiced had led to allegations of informal racism since most workers at tourist enterprises end up being most often white Cubans.

=== Tourism enclaves ===
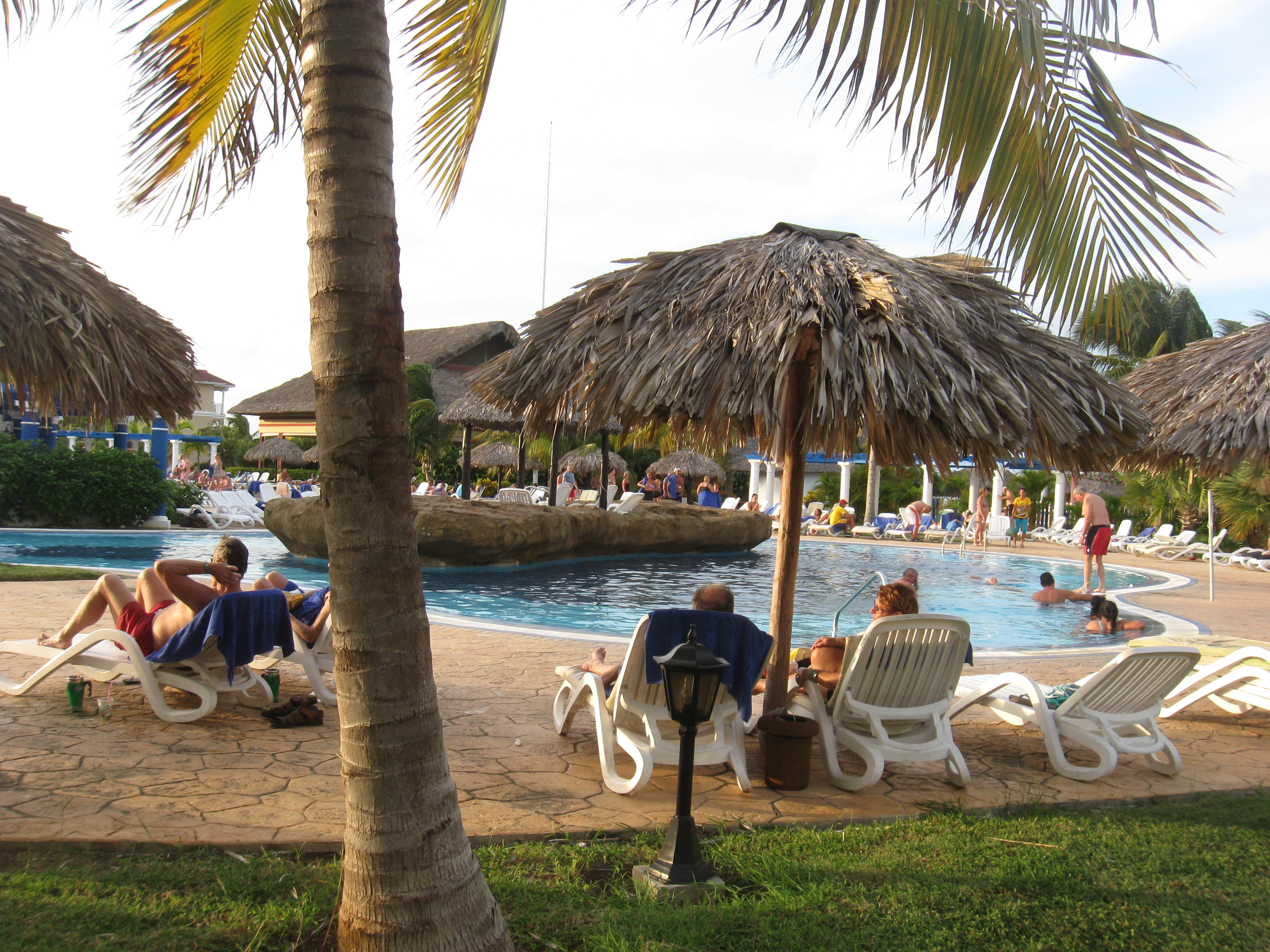
Resort in Varadero, Cuba

The dual economy, which incentivizes foreign investment and tourism, has created tourism enclaves on the island. In 2004 around 80% of foreign tourists resided in Havana or Varadero, with no major tourist destinations elsewhere. It has been inferred that the preference the Cuban government has for developing separated tourist enclaves is to reduce the interactions Cubans have with the often more luxurious lifestyles of foreigners. Most of the resort enclaves outside Havana are on the islands of northern archipelagos, which are a good geographic distance from the mainland and often have no permanent residents.

Old Havana has been the subject of major redevelopment efforts. Many buildings have been architecturally restored, and many have been made into hotels. This redevelopment has come at the expense of the relocation of many locals who had their apartments turned into hotels, as well as a total lack of revitalization efforts elsewhere in Havana or Cuba in general.
