= El Asiento, Cuba =

El Asiento
- Ward
- Location within Cuba
- Coordinates: 22°14′57″N 78°53′03″W
- Country: Cuba
- Municipality: Chambas
- Province: Ciego de Ávila

Population
  - Total: 1,928

El Asiento is a ward (consejo popular) and village in the municipality of Chambas, Ciego de Ávila Province, Cuba.

== Culture ==
In the village and nearby CNA (Non-Agricultural Cooperative) they carry out the traditional Peñas Campesinas. With most of Central Cuba they also carry out the Parrandas.

== Geography ==
The ward has a flat relief, good vegetation stable for the entire year, and surrounded by mountains where limestone is common.
