= Florencia Municipal Museum =

Museum in Cuba

- Museo Municipal de Florencia
- Established: 14 December 1982
- Location: Florencia, Cuba

Florencia Municipal Museum is a museum located in Florencia, Cuba. It was established on 14 December 1982.

The museum holds collections on history, weaponry, archeology and natural science.

== See also ==
- List of museums in Cuba
