= Trocha from Júcaro to Morón =

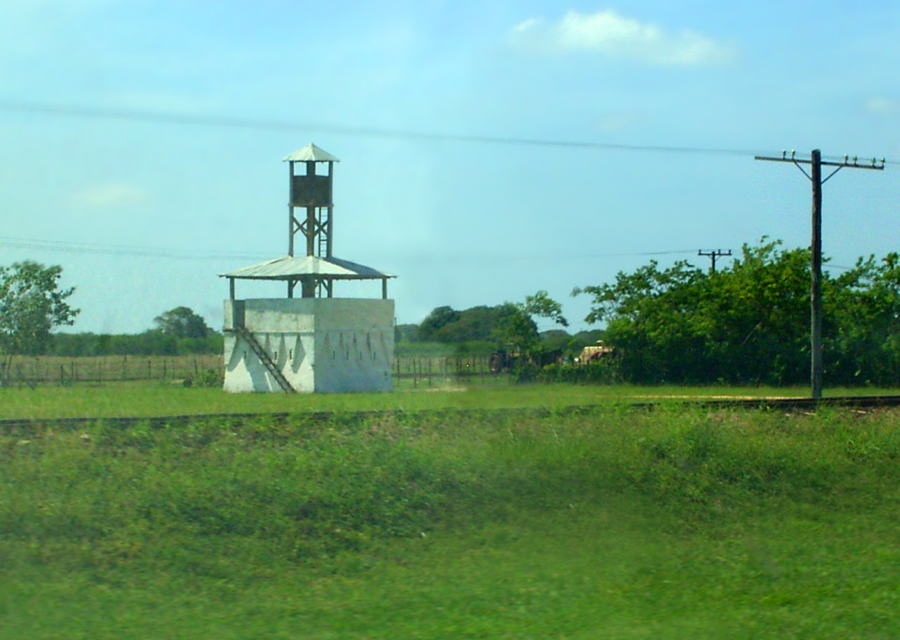
Trocha blockhouse near Morón

The Trocha from Júcaro to Morón (Spanish: Trocha de Júcaro a Morón) was a fortified military line built between 1869 and 1872 in Cuba to impede the pass of insurrectionist forces to the western part of the island during the 1st War of Independence (1868–1878) and was 68 km long between Júcaro and Morón.

== History ==
This military line was the largest Spanish fortification in the colonies during the 19th Century, marking an industrialised expansion of traditional Spanish colonial ditch-work defences. Built by slave and Chinese immigrant labour, it was composed of differently sized forts located along a wide ditch lined with wire fences and a cleared firing zone. A parallel railroad line, the first government railway in Cuba, supplied and re-enforced the forts. Today many of the fortifications have survived and the Trocha is considered among the most important military monuments of the Caribbean, parts of which are protected by the Cuban National Heritage agency.
