= Morón Municipal Museum =

Museum in Cuba

- Museo Municipal de Morón
- Established: 30 November 1981
- Location: Morón, Cuba

Morón Municipal Museum is a museum located in Morón, Cuba. It was established on 30 November 1981.

The museum holds collections on history, weaponry, archeology and ethnology.

== See also ==
- List of museums in Cuba
