= Florencia, Cuba =

Florencia
- Municipality
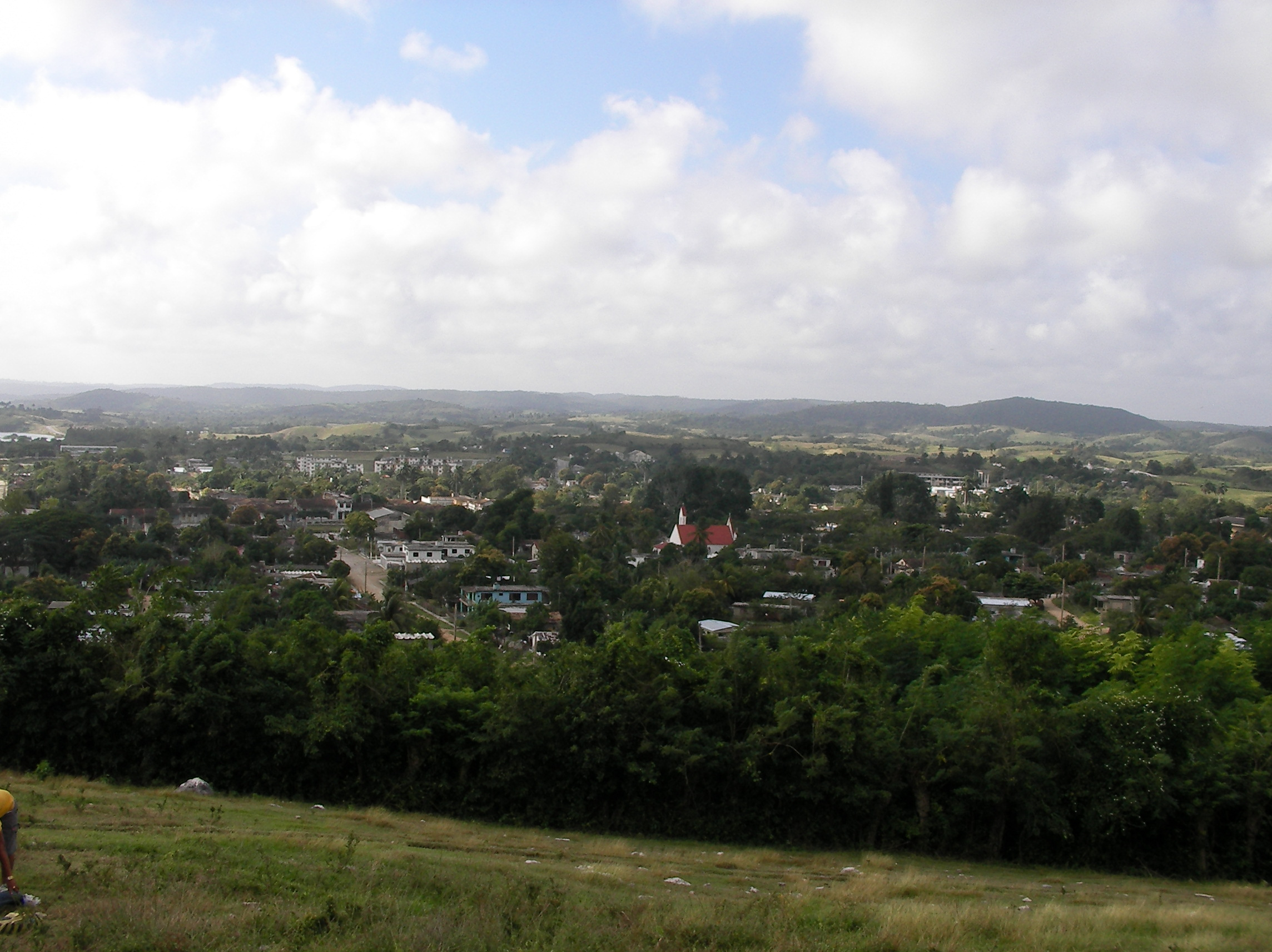

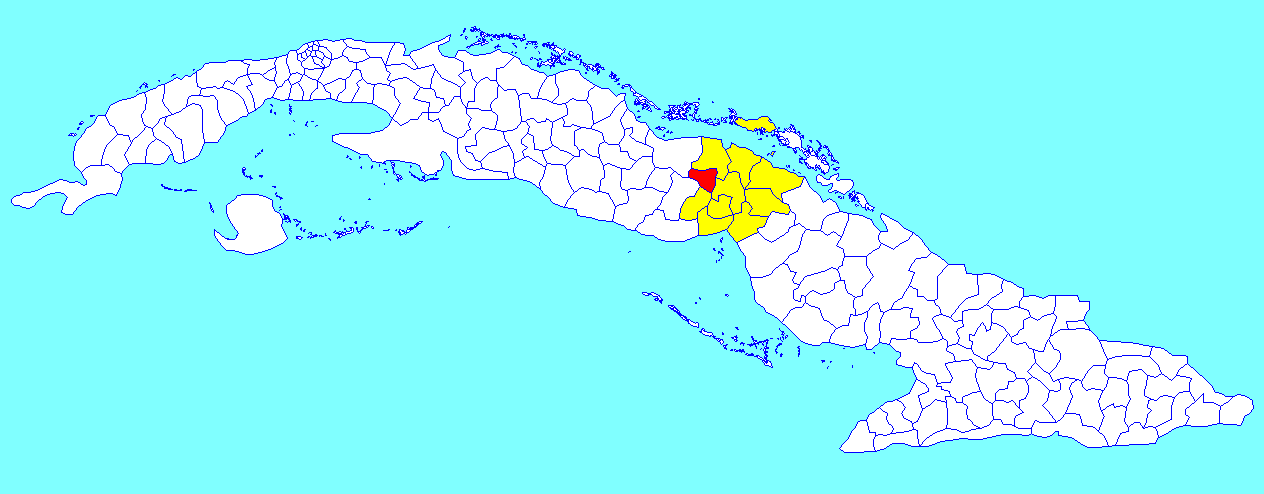
- Florencia municipality (red) within Ciego de Ávila Province (yellow) and Cuba
- Coordinates: 22°08′51″N 78°58′1″W
- Country: Cuba
- Province: Ciego de Ávila

Area
  - Total: 286 km^{2} (110 sq mi)
- Elevation: 110 m (360 ft)

Population (2022)
  - Total: 18,291
  - Density: 64.0/km^{2} (166/sq mi)
- Time zone: UTC-5 (EST)
- Postal code: 67600
- Area code: +53-336
- Website: https://www.florencia.gob.cu/es/

Florencia (Spanish pronunciation: [floˈɾensja]) is a municipality and town in the Ciego de Ávila Province of Cuba. It is located in the western part of the province, south of Chambas. This municipality merged in 1976 as a result of the new political and administrative division of Cuba. Florencia was formerly the barrios of Guadalupe, Tamarindo and Marroquí which were separated from the municipality of Morón.

== Overview ==
The municipality is a mountain region with rivers, forests, and caves with subterranean rivers. A huge hydraulic complex was constructed under Fidel's government in 1991 named "Liberación de Florencia" ("Florencia Independence") since the Florencia area was the first quarter taken by local revolutionary forces in the province of Camagüey on December 14, 1958. This hydraulic complex is located in the fertile valleys of Florencia and Tamarindo and it reinforces the beauty of this Cuban area. Unlike other municipalities in this province, Florencia is the only one where its economy is basically tobacco.

Florencia is also the seat of the municipal government and the biggest city with around 7,000 people. Other towns are Tamarindo, Las Pojas, Lowrey, Guadalupe and Marroquí.

== History ==
Florencia Valley with El Merino Hill behind

In 1920's the Norte de Cuba railroad opened between the cities of Santa Clara and Puerto Tarafa in Nuevitas (Camagüey). The origin of Florencia was the construction of a railroad station to provide access to its Guadalupe neighbors in 1926. Guadalupe is the oldest town in this region. This train station was built on a farm known as El Merino (on a site called Ojo de Agua (eye of water)). The railroad was crucial for this region, it actually was the first means of communication and transport that linked these lost valleys with the rest of country. In the 1920s the roads were almost nonexistent and people lived in complete isolation. The only method of communication and transport was by arreas (mules). With the arrival of the railroad, the farmers became wealthier and as a result many merchants and businessmen moved their companies to be near the new station. Real estate companies and the local owners of the farms started to develop what is now this enchanting town. First the railroad station and then the new town itself was named Florencia. The name was suggested by one of the neighbors who said that the mountain view reminded her of the mountains near Florence in Italy.

The fast increase of its population was in part due to the Sansó & Cia, which opened a big food industry in the town in the 1940s and also as a result of the construction of dams on the Chambas river. When the water of the dams flooded the Florencia and Tamarindo valleys in the 1990s, many of the affected farmers and their families moved to Florencia. Florencia grew quickly, and it has since become the most important cultural and economical centre with the best communications facilities in the area.

Before 1976, Florencia was part of the municipality of Morón, which was divided into six new municipalities of the new province of Ciego de Avila. A new identity was created for people after Florencia became a new municipality: Florencianos (Florencians).

== Geography ==
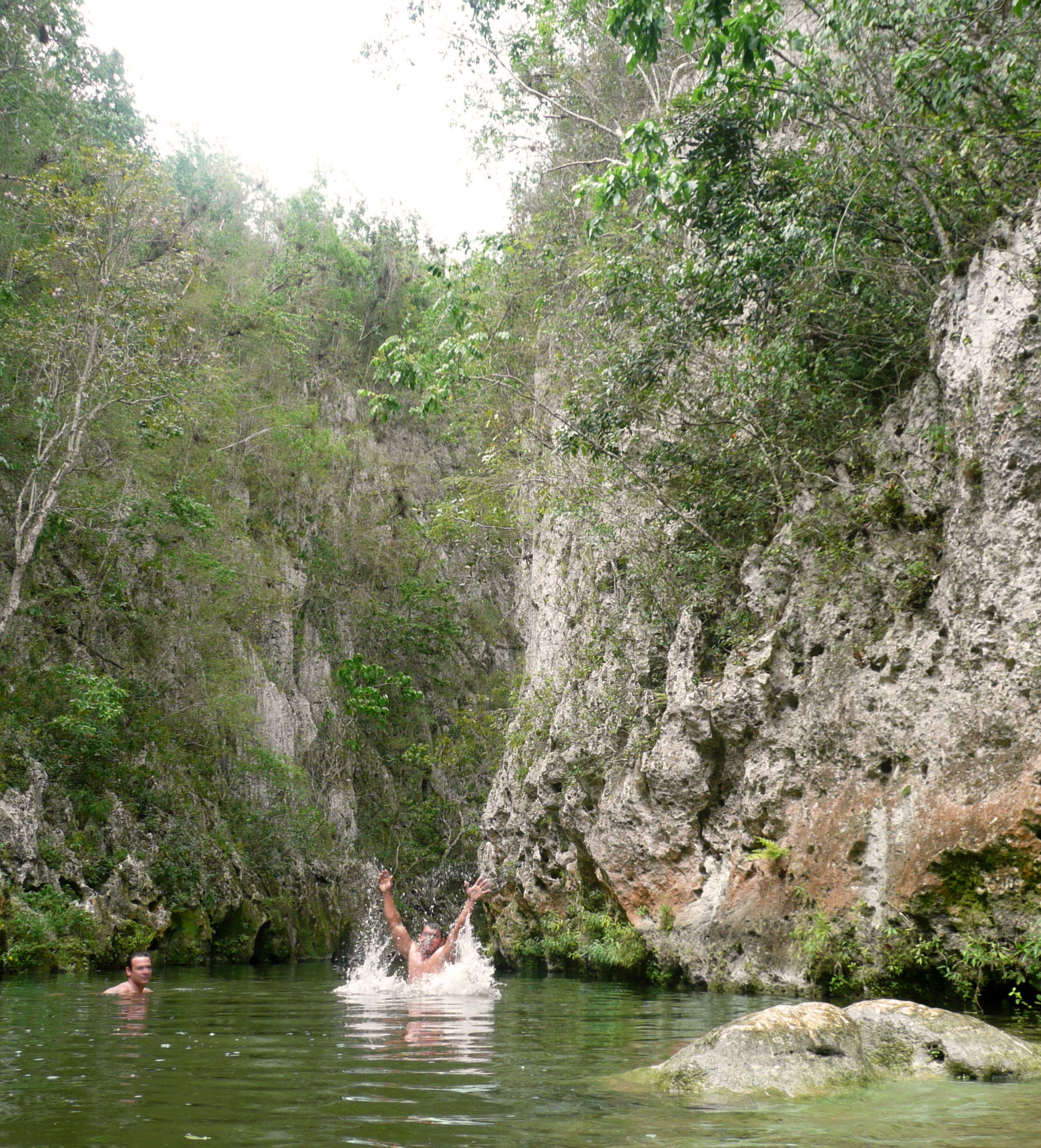
Swimming at Campismo Boqueron

This territory is located in the Northwest Ciego de Ávila Province of Cuba. The Chambas River and its confluents flow South to North across the Florencia, Guadalupe and Tamarindo valleys. The Liberation of Florencia Dams, in this river, cover a great areas of those valleys. The valleys are surrounded by hills which are part of the Central Cordillera (one of the three Mountain Systems of the Island). Those high grounds separate the municipality from the other part of the province which is almost flat and with different geographical features. To the Northwest the North Jatibonico River merges into Jatibonico Sierra forming a system of caves with a singular beauty at a rich forest and fauna area known as Boqueron.

Boqueron is a National Natural Reserve with a camping area and is the location of the Florencia Hipic Center. Between Boqueron and Florencia Valley is El Merino Hill, which is the highest peak of the Jatibonico Sierra with 396.6 m over sea level. The hill is visible from every point of the town.

== Social, Economic and Cultural Life ==
The main economical activity is agriculture with tobacco grown as the major plant. Other important areas include the refinement of conserved food, growth of vegetables and fruit, and livestock production.

The culture tradition of this municipality has its origin fundamentally in the country sector. This sector includes a large ethnic diversity formed mainly by the Canarian Migration from the late 19th century and early 20th century. The major artistic manifestation which more representativity has reached in Florencian lands during its history has been La Décima (literary composition to be sung written in 10 syllables). In Florencia, in 1968 the Primer Taller Literario Decimista de Cuba was founded (First Decimista Literary symposium of Cuba)instituted by humble country men.

People are proud of their traditions and popular celebrations. The most important events are spending entire Saturday nights in parrandas güajiras (Cuban country music parties), celebration of 14 de Diciembre, los Pinos (pine tree), memorials to Isabel Victoria (the first teacher and the greatest contributor to public works in Florencia town) and Lucas Buchillon (the regional poet). At other times, the election of La Flor de Virama (the tobacco flower) (similar to a Miss Florencia contest) and the Carnaval Star are some of the most exciting activities. In Tamarindo the celebration of January'28 is important. All of these festivities are celebrated as street parties, very common in Cuba.

There are many cultural institutions such as the Florencia Municipal Museum, which has a rich collection of objects of Cuban Natives recovered from different areas of the Chambas River shores, Casa de la Cultura (cultural house), and Municipal Library.

Boqueron a National Natural Reserve is 4 km west of Florencia city and it is a local, national and international touristic destination. This natural reserve has caves, rivers, and a rich forest and animal life. The "Hipic Center of Florencia" located at Boqueron area, together with fishing at the "Liberación" Dam are the most important tourist attractions.

== Demographics ==
In 2004, the municipality of Florencia had a population of 19,811. With a total area of 286 km^{2} (110 sq mi), it has a population density of 69.3/km^{2} (179/sq mi). Now, Florencia has a negative average population growth, it was -4.59 in 2004. The municipality population decreased from 19,856 in 2002 to 19,765 in 2004. This is controversial in Ciego de Avila where the province has one of the highest average population growths in the nation. In 2022 the population was 18,291.

== Notable people ==
- Omar Carrero is one of the most important pitchers in the history of the Cuban Beisbol Team and the most valuable player of 1976, on the list of most valuable players (Spanish: jugadores mas valiosos or jugadores mas destacados) in the Cuban National Series. He was born and grew up in the village known as Lowrey, where his family and relatives live today.
- Jaime Sarusky is a narrator and journalist. In 2004, he was the National Literary Award winner. Most notable amongst his works is The Ghost Of Omaja (1986)

== See also ==
- Municipalities of Cuba
- List of cities in Cuba
