= Chicola =

Coordinates: 22°18′7.2″N 78°43′26.4″W

Chicola was a small port on the north coast of the Fallas, Cuba. It was built in 1932 by the Fallas-Gutiérrez sugar company to ship to the US the sugar produced by the factories of Central Patria and Central Adelaida. It is located on a bay in front of Cayo Coco island, near the Laguna de Leche, at c. 30 km north-west of Morón, Ciego de Ávila Province.

== History ==
The name came from the Spanish word (chico), which means "small" or "tight". The only access to Chicola was through 9 kilometers of railroad that ran, from Falla, on a heavily forested and swampy terrain. The sugar was carried in railroad wagons and then loaded onto flat-bottom boats to be taken over 25 miles of shallow sea (6 feet) to deep ocean, (Cayo Guillermo), where it was transferred to big liners. It operated until 1968. In 1962 the Cuban coast guard installed a station with a 100-foot-high watchtower, which was closed in 1975. Today it is an abandoned locality visited only by fishermen. The railways were salvaged for materials for cattle fence construction.
