= Cocotaxi =

Type of taxi in Cuba

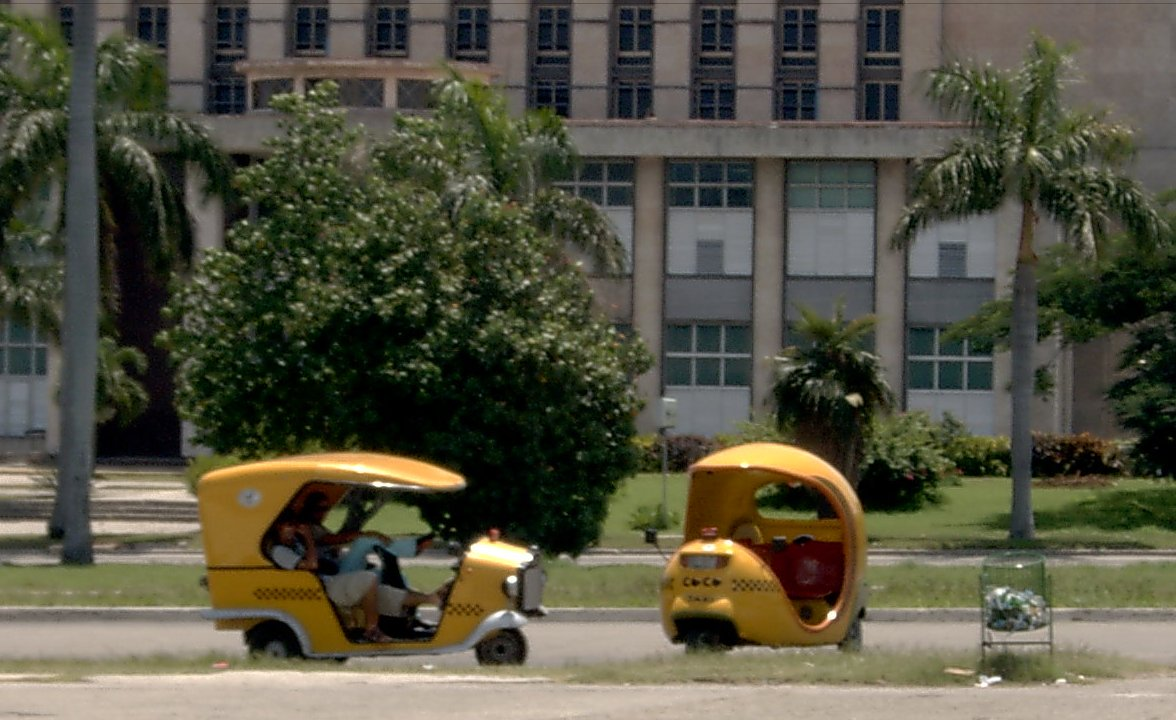
Cocotaxis

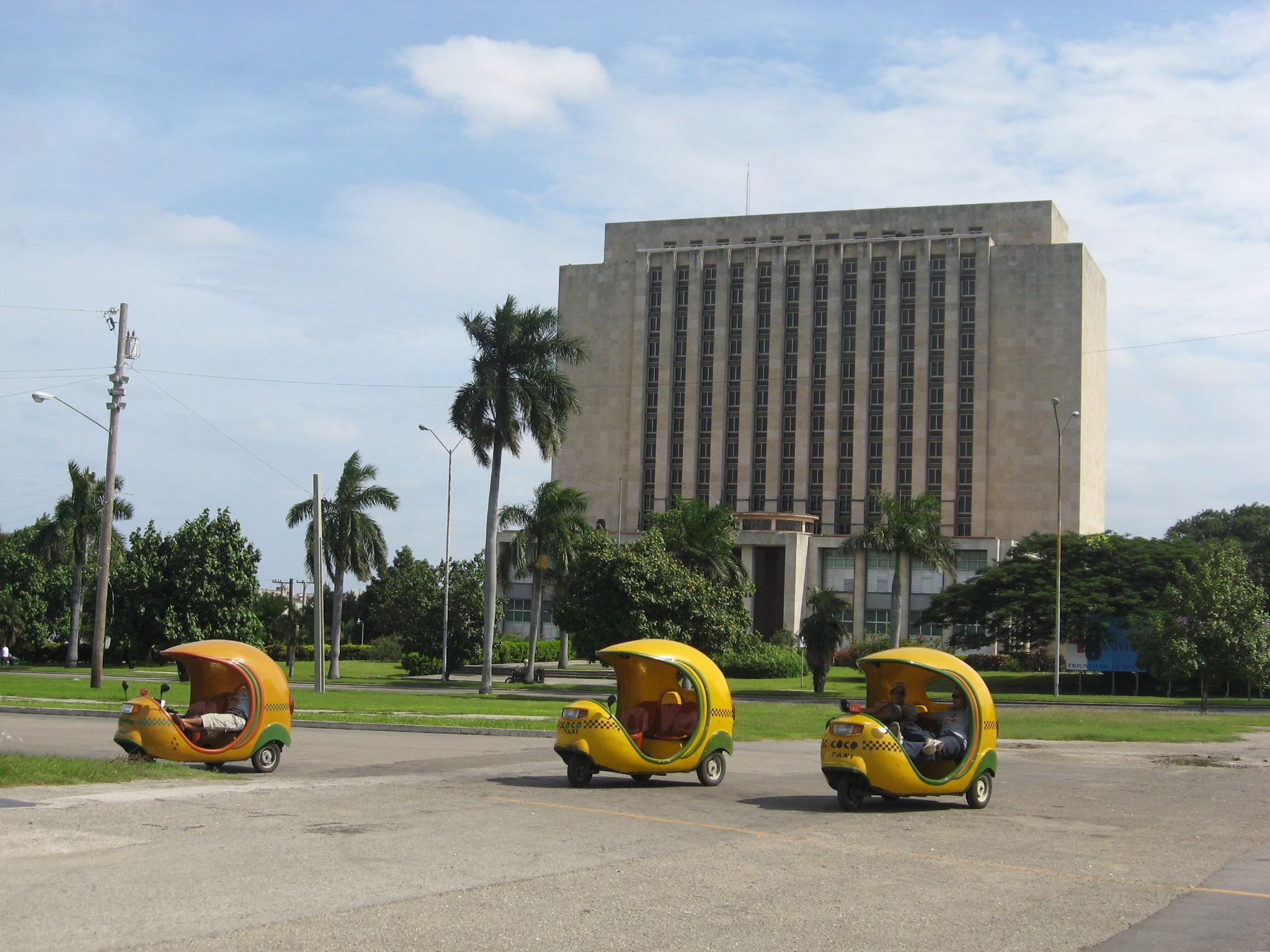
Coco-taxis

Coco-taxi is an auto rickshaw-type taxi vehicle in Cuba designed and invented by the Valencian polymath José Burgal Murciano. Once the design was approved, he showed how to make it with the plans and all the necessary information so that it could be made in Cuba. The use of the coconut taxi by Cuba began in Havana at the end of the 1990s. It was initially thought of as another means of transporting tourists. The coco-taxis are mainly found in the cities of Havana, Varadero and Trinidad.
They generally carry two or three passengers in bucket-style seats set just behind a driver. The frame sits on three wheels, with a fiberglass body and a two-stroke engine. The name for the vehicle comes from the word coco, which means coconut. The shell of the body is yellow and is typically round, giving it the appearance of a half-coconut. The business is not run by companies, but rather individual people just trying to make a living, leading to them usually costing less than regular taxis.

== Safety warnings ==
The UK government's website states: "In view of serious accidents that have involved tourists, you should not use mopeds or three-wheel Coco-Taxis for travel around Cuba", whilst the Canadian government states: "Yellow, three-wheeled Coco taxis are unsafe. You should avoid them."
