= Chambas Municipal Museum =

Museum in Cuba

Chambas Municipal Museum is a museum located in Chambas, Cuba. It was established on 29 December 1982. It has collections on archeology, history, ethnology and natural sciences.

== See also ==
- List of museums in Cuba
