= Laguna de Leche =

Fresh water lake in Cuba

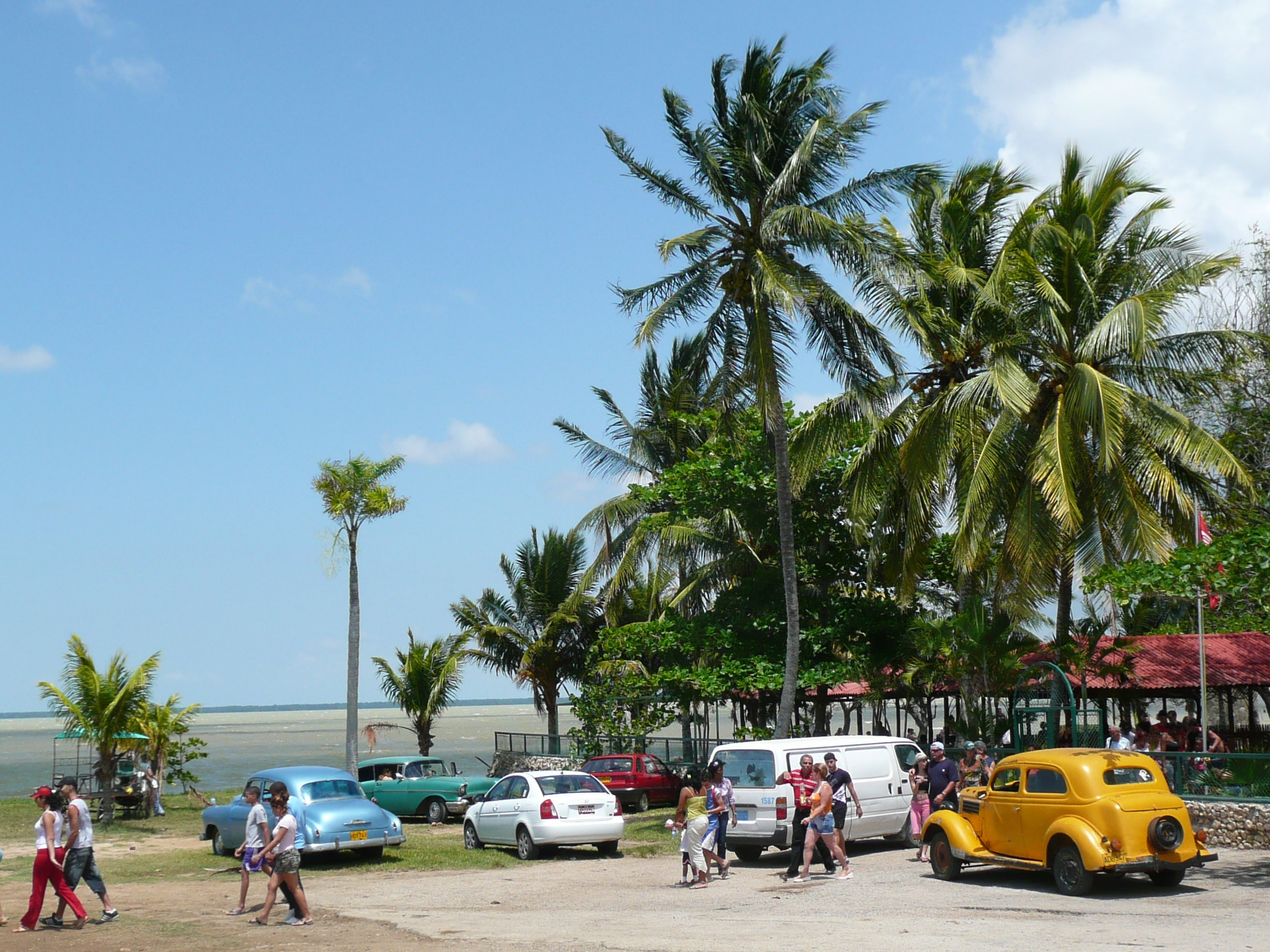
- Touristic venue at Laguna de Leche

- Location within Cuba
- Location: Cuba
- Coordinates: 22°12′33″N 78°37′17″W
- Primary outflows: Bay of Buena Vista
- Basin countries: Cuba
- Max. length: 14 km (8.7 mi)
- Max. width: 7.7 km (4.8 mi)
- Surface area: 67.2 km^{2} (25.9 sq mi)
- Surface elevation: 1 m (3.3 ft)
- Settlements: Morón

Laguna de Leche (Spanish for "Milk Lagoon", also called Laguna Grande de Morón) is the largest natural freshwater lake in Cuba. It is located in the wetland of northern Ciego de Ávila Province, 5 km (3.1 mi) north of Morón, and has a total surface of 67.2 square kilometres (25.9 sq mi). The man-made Zaza Reservoir, at 113.5 km^{2} (43.8 sq mi), is the largest inland body of water by area in the country.

== Overview ==
The white color is caused by the lake's limestone bed. Natural movements of the sea level cause disturbances in the water table, which releases lime particles from the lake bed into the water.

A channel built in 1940 (Chicola Channel) connected the lake to the Bay of Buena Vista, allowing for the sugar processed in Morón to reach the small port of Chicola. In the process, the lake was contaminated with sea water, and it lost its characteristic white color. The channel was closed in 1988, and the milky color gradually recovered.

The Caribbean flamingo finds a natural habitat in the lake and its islands

== See also ==
- Chicola
