= Morón, Cuba =

Morón
- Municipality
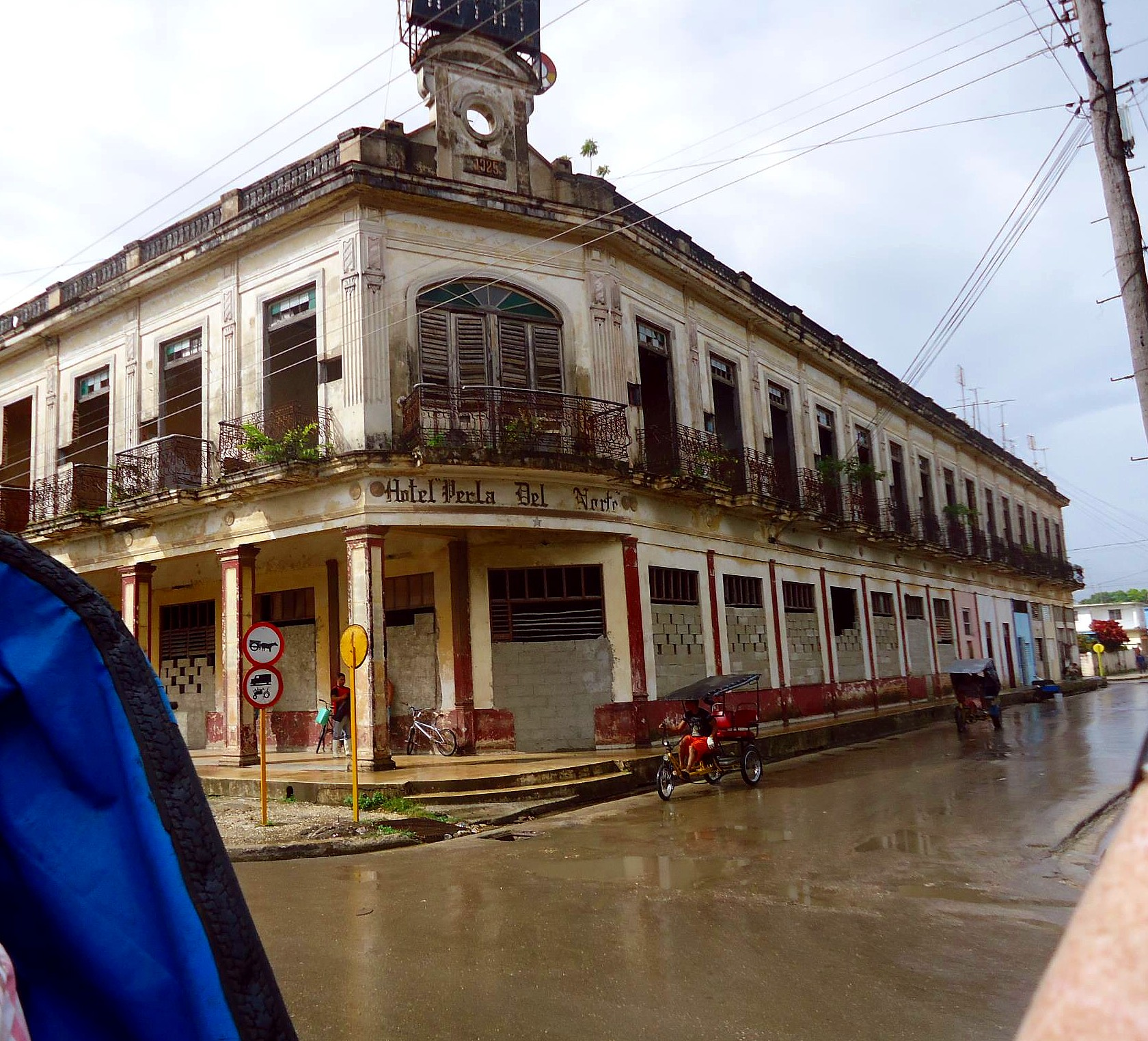
- Hotel "Perla del Norte"

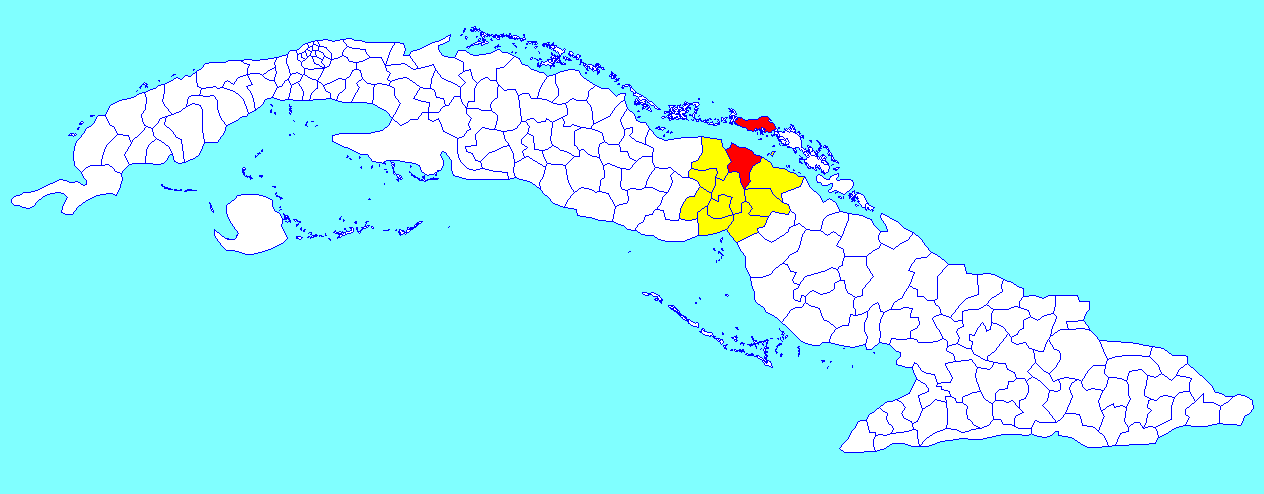
- Morón municipality (red) within Ciego de Ávila Province (yellow) and Cuba
- Coordinates: 22°06′39″N 78°37′40″W
- Country: Cuba
- Province: Ciego de Ávila
- Founded: 1543
- Established: 1750

Area
  - Total: 615.1 km^{2} (237.5 sq mi)
- Elevation: 7 m (23 ft)

Population (2022)
  - Total: 70,561
  - Density: 114.7/km^{2} (297.1/sq mi)
- Time zone: UTC-5 (EST)
- Area code: +53 33
- Website: https://www.moron.gob.cu/es/

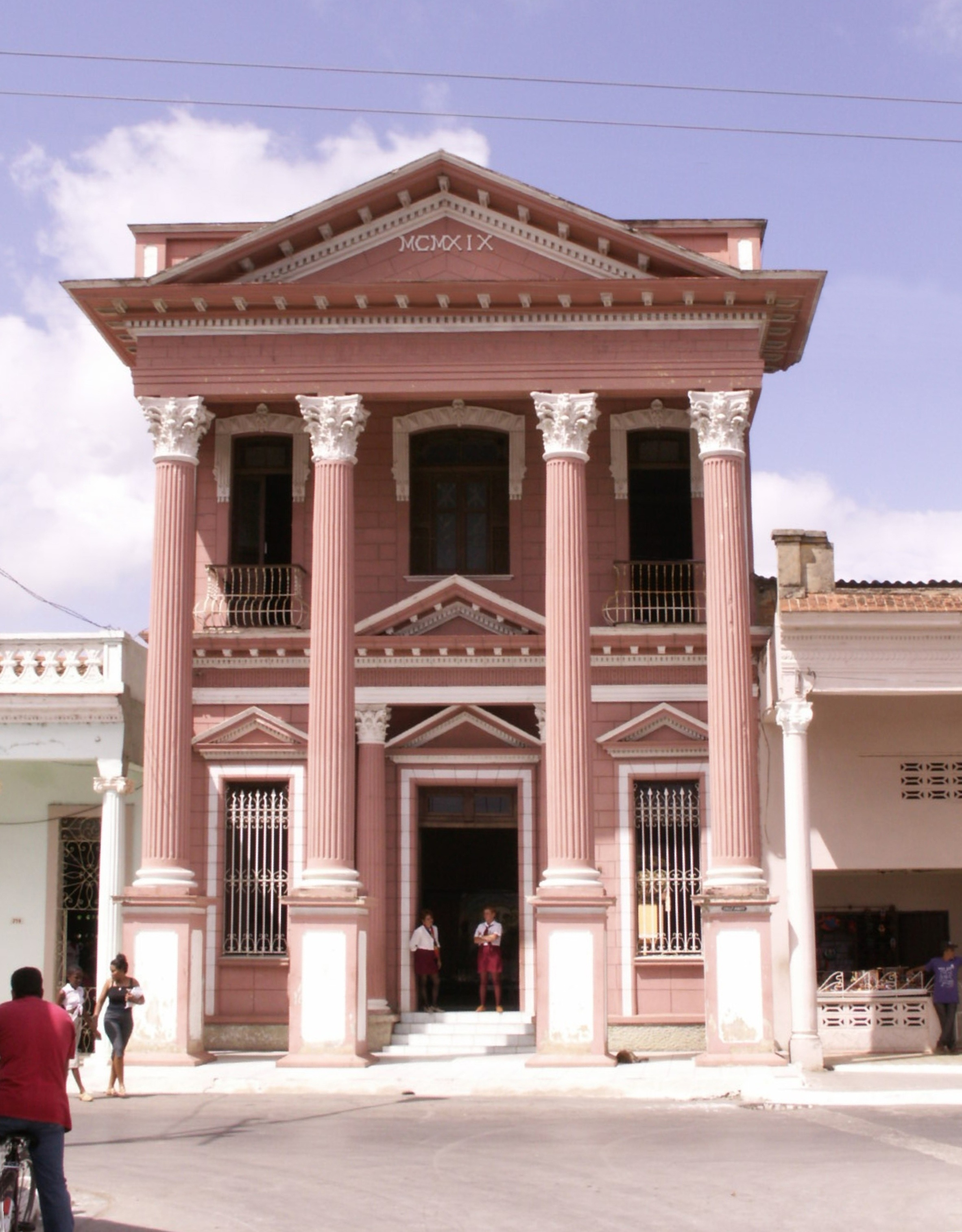
City museum of Morón, with neoclassical facade.

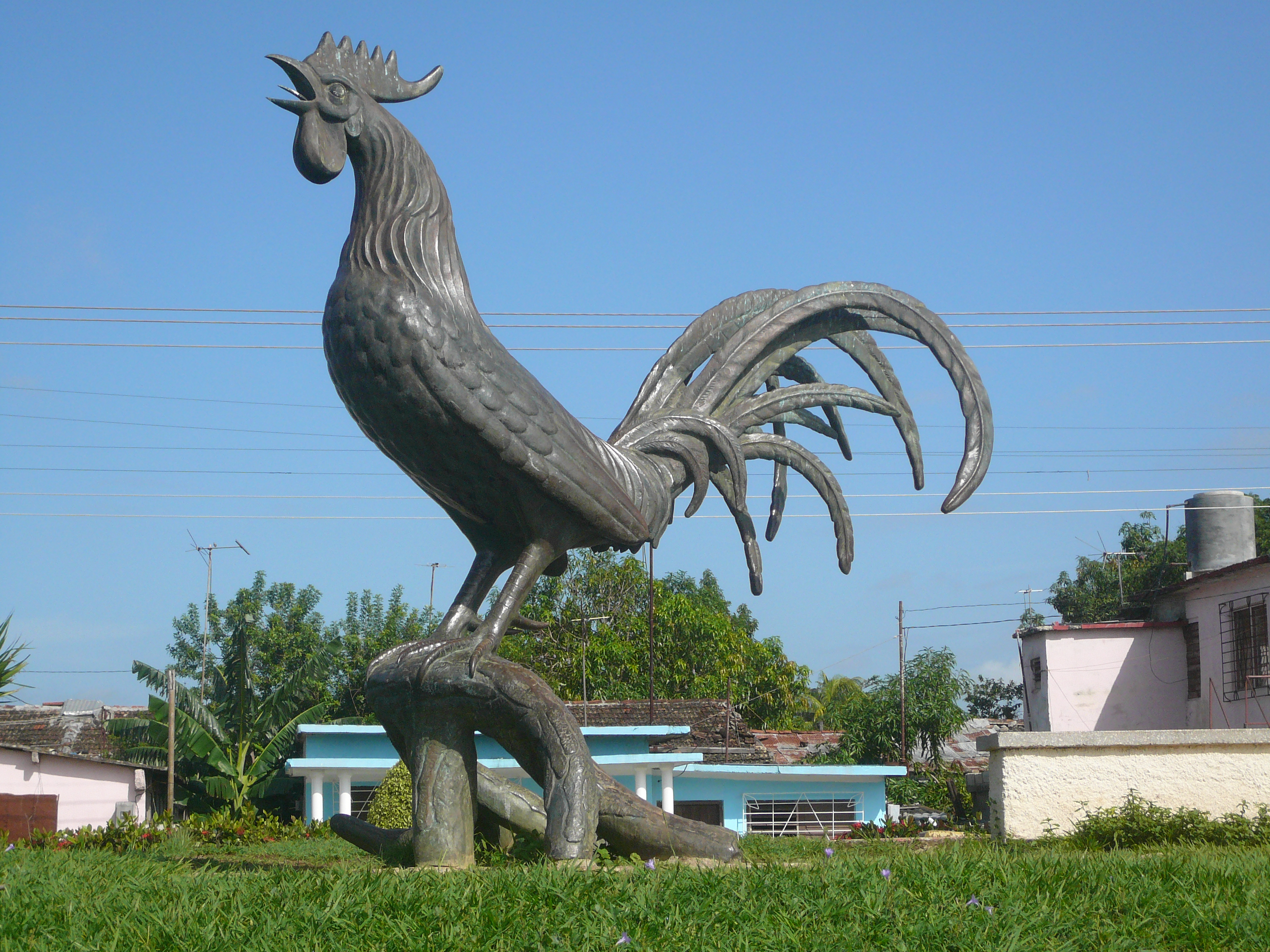
The Morón rooster

Morón is a city and a municipality in Ciego de Ávila Province in central Cuba. It is one of ten municipalities in the province, and is the second in importance and the oldest. Morón is the closest city to the tourist resorts on Cayo Coco and Cayo Guillermo.

== Geography ==
The municipality is located north of the city of Ciego de Ávila, bordering the Bolivia municipality to the east, Chambas to the west, the Bay of Buena Vista and the Jardines del Rey to the north and the Ciro Redondo municipality to the south. The terrain is mostly plain, with small hills to the north, made up of salt domes. The north shore is covered by marshes.

Morón has the largest natural water mirror in Cuba, Laguna de Leche, of 67.2 km^{2} (25.9 sq mi). Cayo Coco and Cayo Guillermo, two of the cays of Jardines del Rey archipelago is located north of Morón, across the Bay of Dogs (Bahia Perros).

Previously the municipality was much larger, being one of nine in the previous province of Camagüey. In 1943, it was divided into the barrios of Coronel Hernández, Chambas, Cupeyes, Este, Guadalupe, Mabuya, Marroquí, Oeste, Punta Alegre, Ranchuelo, Santa Gertrudis, Simón Reyes o Sandoval and Tamarindo.

== History ==
=== Early history ===
The first residents of Morón were Creoles from Sancti Spíritus, although among them were also said to be a group of Spanish sailors who, having navigated all around Cuba, had disembarked nearby and had decided to settle here. They were from Andalusia, in Old Castile, Extremadura, Galicia and the Canary Islands, among other places.

In the first half of the 20th century, the archipelago and the nearby keys had attained little development. The town of Morón, which started as a community in 1750, survived on a basis of a limited, non-mechanized agricultural, and mostly sugar, production. The settlement pattern that prevailed in the coastal areas and keys was that of squatters, people living in very poor, tach-roof, earth floor dwellings, usually not more than five houses together.

Making charcoal and fishing, in many cases both activities at the same time, were apparently the main economic activities on the keys and their surroundings. Fishing was mostly done by using dinghies moved by sticks, oars, or small sails, which did not allow them to venture out of the key shelf. This means were the ones used also to reach the mainland and to transport products out. In the settlements, livestock was mostly limited to a few animals. Still standing at some places are remains of the stone fences that were used to confine the animal.

Living conditions here were in general very difficult, due mostly to the remoteness of the area and the lack of proper means of transportation. Transportation consisted usually of a small sailboat that traveled back and forth once a month, and whose journey took many hours, Reaching the mainland from Cayo Coco, for example, took around 10 hours, in addition to the risks that had to be run at sea.

During Cuba's 1st War of Independence in 1869, the town of Morón became the northern end of the line of forts, the Trocha from Júcaro to Morón built by the Spanish to contain Cuban rebels on the eastern end of the island. The Trocha also included a railroad line to move troops and supplies, the first government railroad line in Cuba.

=== Recent history ===
The town of Morón began to grow in 1915 when the Trocha rail line was bought by Colonel Jose M. Tarafa as he began to assemble the Ferrocarriles del Norte railway line. Morón was chosen as the line's headquarters. The railway's maintenance shops and a large central station became the central feature of the town. Morón became the junction of a network of several branchlines and sugar lines which stimulated the expansions of sugar plantations and centralized sugar mills which previously were located mainly in the south and central part of Cuba.

In the 1960s a road was built through the marshland to the coast, and in the 1990s this was extended on a man-made causeway to Cayo Coco and Cayo Guillermo, where a number of hotels were built. Many of the hotel workers live in Morón and commute to work in specially provided buses.

== Economy ==
The main economic activities are agriculture and tourism.

== Demographics ==
In 2022, the municipality of Morón had a population of 70,561. With a total area of 615 km^{2} (237 sq mi), it has a population density of 110/km^{2} (280/sq mi).

== Transport ==
Morón railway station is an important junction point between the lines Santa Clara-Nuevitas, and Júcaro-Ciego de Ávila-Morón. The northern state highway, "Circuito Norte" (CN), passes through the city; and the main road from Ciego de Ávila to Cayo Coco also skirts it.

Jardines del Rey Airport, located in Cayo Coco, serves the municipality. It replaces the former Cayo Coco Airport, demolished in 2002.

== Notable residents ==
- Onel Hernández (born 1993), footballer
- Pío Leyva (1917–2006), singer

== See also ==
- List of cities in Cuba
- Municipalities of Cuba
- Morón Municipal Museum
